= Women in the Haitian Revolution =

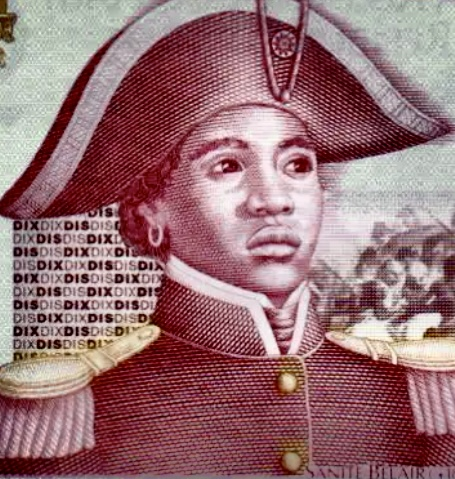
Depiction of Sanité Belair on a banknote of Haiti

During the Haitian Revolution (1791–1804), Haitian women of all social standings engaged in an uprising of enslaved people that successfully ousted French colonial power from the island. The 1791 revolt of enslaved individuals in Saint-Domingue was the largest and most successful slave rebellion in modern history. Despite their various important roles in the Haitian Revolution, women revolutionaries have rarely been included or acknowledged in historical and literary narratives of the slave revolts. However, in recent years, extensive academic research has been dedicated to their roles and contributions to the revolution.

== Women in Pre-Revolutionary Saint-Domingue ==
In the French colony of Saint-Domingue, enslaved African women and women of Creole descent endured atrocities at the hands of those who owned them. The Code Noir stipulated that enslaved women were property first. This, in turn, stripped these women of all autonomy; owners held legal control over their physical body, their children, and labor. Enslaved women endured various forms of gendered violence in addition to the standard abuse and mistreatment of slaves. Rape and sexual abuse of enslaved women commonly occurred in the colony. To assert their dominance and dehumanize their property, owners used sexual violence, forced reproduction, and sexual punishment as a means of control. These violent acts and forced reproduction damaged enslaved women internally. Due to high infant mortality and a low fertility rate, enslaved women were kept from engaging in monogamous family relationships and instead were treated as objects of reproduction. Many of these women resorted to suicide.

Enslaved women in Saint-Domingue faced brutal sexual violence and exploitation at the hands of their white slave owners. While some slave owners used enslaved women as a means to produce more slaves, others encouraged their female slaves to have abortions in order to maximize their labor and avoid losing slaves. It's also assumed that enslaved women would secretly manage their own fertility as a form of protest.

Infanticide was also a method of resistance for enslaved women. While many children did die as a result of disease and illness, the general consensus among colonists was that infanticide was being used by mothers and midwives to prevent the births of more slaves and this led to laws prohibiting midwifery by slave women.

== Women's roles in the revolution ==
Although they are historically underrepresented, women played an integral role in establishing and sustaining the Haitian Revolution. This movement was initiated by enslaved people, in an effort to not only liberate themselves but to remove the French from the island entirely. Providing aid through logistics, espionage, and combat, women played various roles in the rebel cause. Rebels used a variety of tactics to meet their goal; organizing meetings and coordinating attacks in secrecy.

=== Espionage ===
Haitian women were uniquely suited for espionage, as French men often kept women around as prostitutes, maids, and merchants. Taking advantage of their positions, Haitian women supported the revolution by carrying messages across town, hiding officers facing execution, and more. In doing so, they risked being captured, tortured for information, and publicly hung. The French reacted by developing countermeasures meant to limit women's autonomy, including requiring Black women to declare their professions and justify their presence in town, or be sent to prison.

=== Labor organizing ===
Women in Saint-Domingue were perceived as inherently inferior and enslaved women were given no relief in their labor expectations. Women were forced to work strenuous hours from sun up to sun down, and sometimes working late into the night. As conditions continued to worsen enslaved women began to organize and refuse to perform life-threatening work. One documented example, remarks on women who worked the night shift in a sugarcane mill, who protested working with machinery in the dark that could seriously injure or kill them.

=== Vodou ===
The practice of Vodou was a tool of the Haitian Revolution. Enslaved women who escaped their slave owners to live as maroons were able to return to their roles as practitioners of Vodou because they would not be punished for rejecting French Catholicism. Communities of escaped slaves turned to Vodou mambos, or priestesses, which radicalized them and facilitated the organization of a liberation movement. Vodou mambos were also typically knowledgeable of herbal remedies as well as poisons, which were weaponized and used against French slave owners and their families during the revolution. Ideologically, the image of a Haitian Vodou priestess inspired insurgents to fight the colonial government in order to not only liberate themselves but to serve a higher, spiritual purpose.

The most famous mambo in Haitian revolutionary history is Cécile Fatiman. Born of an enslaved woman and a slave owner, she is remembered for having performed a Vodou ceremony for hundreds of rebel slaves the night before the revolution began, inspiring them through ritual song and dance to take up the fight for freedom. She reportedly lived to be 112 years old, never ceasing to practice Vodou. Another woman, Dédée Bazile, has a similar legacy as a mystic of the revolution. Although Dédée was not known as a mambo, she became known as Défilée-la-folle, or Défilée the Madwoman. Born to slaves, Dédée had several children conceived by rape committed by her master. Her "madness" was allegedly caused by the murder of her parents by French soldiers as well as the many instances of sexual violence she endured. After the murder of revolutionary leader Jean-Jacques Dessalines, she is said to have been responsible for gathering his decomposing remains, reassembling the pieces of his mutilated body, and ensuring that he be buried with dignity. Today, Dédée is hailed as an icon of the Haitian Revolution, a symbol of the "madness" of the Haitian people's commitment to their land.

=== Combat ===
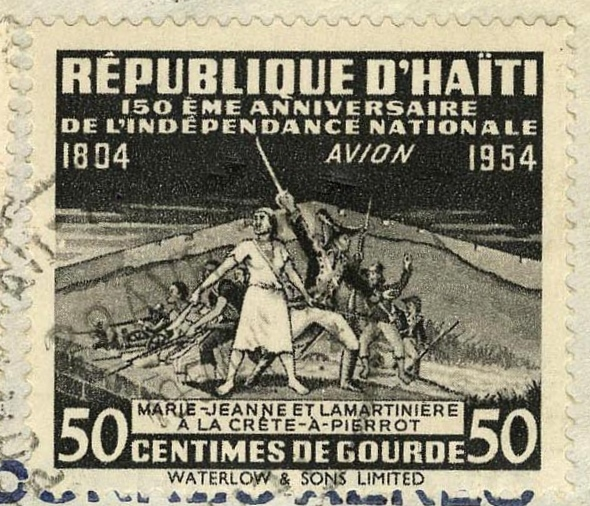
1954 Stamp commemorating the 150th anniversary of Haitian independence featuring Marie-Jeanne Lamartinière and her husband.

Women also took up arms and served in the anti-colonial Haitian military, participating at all levels of military involvement. Some scholars attribute the widespread participation of women in combat to West African traditions of allowing women to actively serve in battle. Some progressed as high up the ranks of the military as possible; Marie-Jeanne Lamartinière, for example, served in Toussaint L'Ouverture's army. She led the insurgent forces in the famous Battle of Crête-à-Pierrot. From 1791 to 1792, Romaine-la-Prophétesse and wife Marie Roze Adam led an uprising of thousands of slaves and came to govern two main cities in southern Haiti, Léogâne and Jacmel. Romaine was assigned and often regarded as male, but dressed and behaved like a woman, prominently identified as a prophetess and spoke of being possessed of a female spirit and may have been transgender, and is counted by Mary Grace Albanese and Hourya Bentouhami among the women who led the Haitian Revolution.

Women also assisted in carrying arms, cannons, and ammunition. They served as military nurses, relying on herbal and folk medicines to treat rebels in remote areas with little to no resources. In addition, women worked as spies, posing as sex workers and merchants in order to deliver messages and gain information about the French. Some women are reported to have used sex to obtain money, weapons, resources, military intelligence, manumission, or mercy for themselves or loved ones. These incidents were rarely the choices of the women involved; rather, women's bodies were used by Haitian military forces to further the revolution, which reinforced the pre-revolutionary patriarchal exploitation of women.

== French women ==
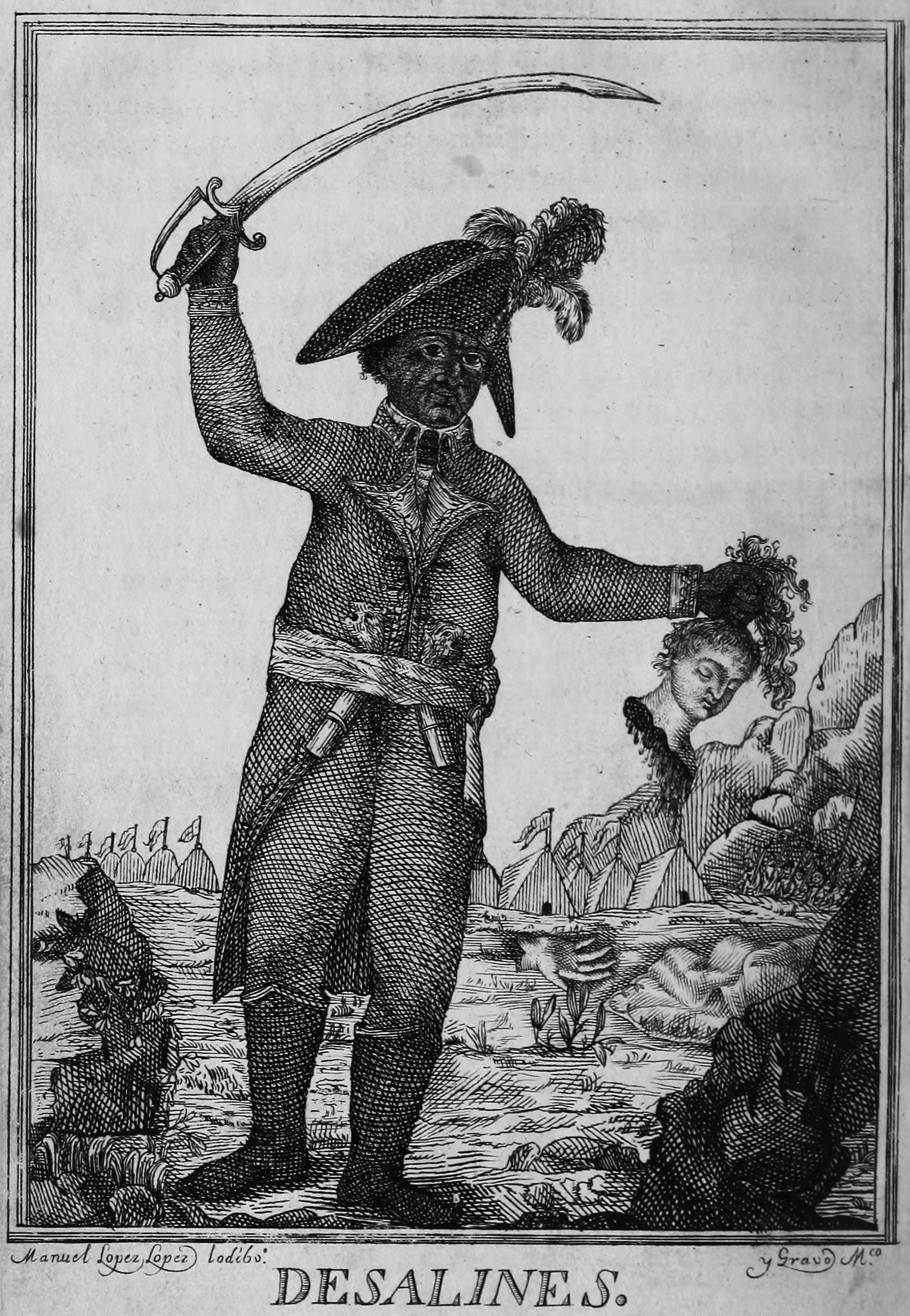
An 1806 engraving of Jean-Jacques Dessalines from a Spanish translation of a French biography. It depicts the general, sword raised in one arm, while the other holds the severed head of a French woman.

In 1804 the revolutionary leader Jean-Jacques Dessalines led a campaign of massacres against the remaining European population, many of whom were unwilling to live in peace with the formally enslaved Black population. An overwhelming number of Europeans killed were French; excluded from the massacre were surviving Polish Legionnaires, who had defected from the French legion to become allied with the enslaved Haitians, as well as the Germans, who did not take part of the slave trade. They were instead granted full citizenship under the new Haitian government.

In parallel to the killings, plundering and rape also occurred. Women and children were generally killed last. French women were "often raped or pushed into forced marriages under threat of death." Dessalines did not specifically mention that the French women should be killed, and the soldiers were reportedly somewhat hesitant to do so. In the end, however, the women were also put to death, though normally at a later stage of the massacre than the adult men. Dessalines's advisors had argued for the killing of French women, arguing that the French would not truly be eradicated if French women were spared to give birth to new Frenchmen.

== Punishments for Haitian women ==
Because of the high involvement of Black Haitian women in the Haitian Revolution, colonial French military forces let go of their plans to institute gender-specific punishments. When captured, women revolutionaries were executed alongside men, only occasionally receiving special treatment on the basis of their gender. Sanité Bélair, a Black freedwoman who served as a lieutenant in the army of Toussaint L'Ouverture, was sentenced to death following her capture. At the moment of her execution, she refused to be blindfolded by her executioners and is documented to have stared them in the eyes as she died.

=== Sexual assault ===
The sexual brutality Black women faced in Haiti consisted of continual rape by plantation owners oftentimes leading to infertility. Female slaves were seen as equal opportunity victims for the French during the revolution and they suffered continual attacks and rapes. While white men and women were united by their fear and hatred for people of color, Haitian women faced a harsher, intersecting threat to their freedom that motivated them to join the fight for liberation. In doing so, Haitian women were opening themselves up to more physical and sexual danger, becoming "equal opportunity" victims for the French to rape, torture, and execute. In the Pacific women's bodies, specifically native and slave women, were commodified resulting in sexual violence that intertwined with colonial capitalistic pursuits. The sexual desire Creoles and Parisian people had for black women and native women in Saint-Domingue left these men vulnerable to being manipulated by the women they were sexually exploiting. This made it possible for these women to serve as concubines and spies for the revolution. Blinded by an "exotic" desire for the slave women in Haiti these men were open to manipulation by these revolutionary women. This was because the Creoles desired for a time when it was easier to pursue their sexual desires so they were facile for these women to manipulate for intel or espionage. Sexual violence is a large part of the Haitian Revolution that has been un-discussed and continues as a cycle of sexual violence in contemporary Haiti.

== Intersectionality ==
Black women in Haiti were in the most unique position because of the intersection of both their race and their gender. The bodily exploitation, forced reproduction, and gendered oppression under slavery and a patriarchal society informed enslaved women's motivations for eventually joining the fight in the Haitian Revolution. Because of this intersection Black women in Haiti bore the full brunt of Haitian violence and oppression during the revolution. Black women's bodies before, during, and after the revolution were being controlled, and so the burden of motherhood was put upon these slave women, whether it be motherhood forced upon them or motherhood forcibly taken from them. Prior to the revolution, the labor demands on enslaved women's bodies were extreme. Plantation owners hoped their female slaved would get pregnant, usually with the hopes of expanding their workforce through the means of reproduction, but the physical conditions of the manual labor enslaved women were forced to perform put them under so much stress that the birth rate in plantations remained low. This contributed to an act of resistance unique to black slave women, the resistance of performing abortions to reclaim their fertility and the autonomy of their bodies. Another form of resistance enslaved women of color employed was the act of marronnage, or escaping to self-liberated communities. Marronnage has been a form of resistance against slavery since Africans arrived on the island of Haiti. Women that fled, free from the harsh conditions of plantation life, were recorded to having a higher birth rate than enslaved women. This suggests that maroon women had more control over their autonomy and reproductive lives. These self-liberated communities, and the networks that were formed within them, laid the groundwork for the Haitian Revolution's early stages.

Overseas, Black women's freedom and Haiti's sovereignty were not recognized. When white slaveholders fled Haiti to the United States, they would sometimes take the enslaved people from their estate with them. In Maryland, thanks to inconsistency in laws about freedom, Black Haitians could petition for their freedom in the courts. White slaveholding women often took on white men as allies in court. They had significantly more rights than the Black Haitian women they fought against, but still lived under patriarchy. By fighting for their rights in court, Black Haitian women were also opening the door to the recognition of Haiti as a sovereign nation by the United States.
