= Haitian Revolution =

1791–1804 slave revolt in Hispanola

- Part of the Atlantic Revolutions, Age of Revolution and the French Revolutionary and Napoleonic Wars
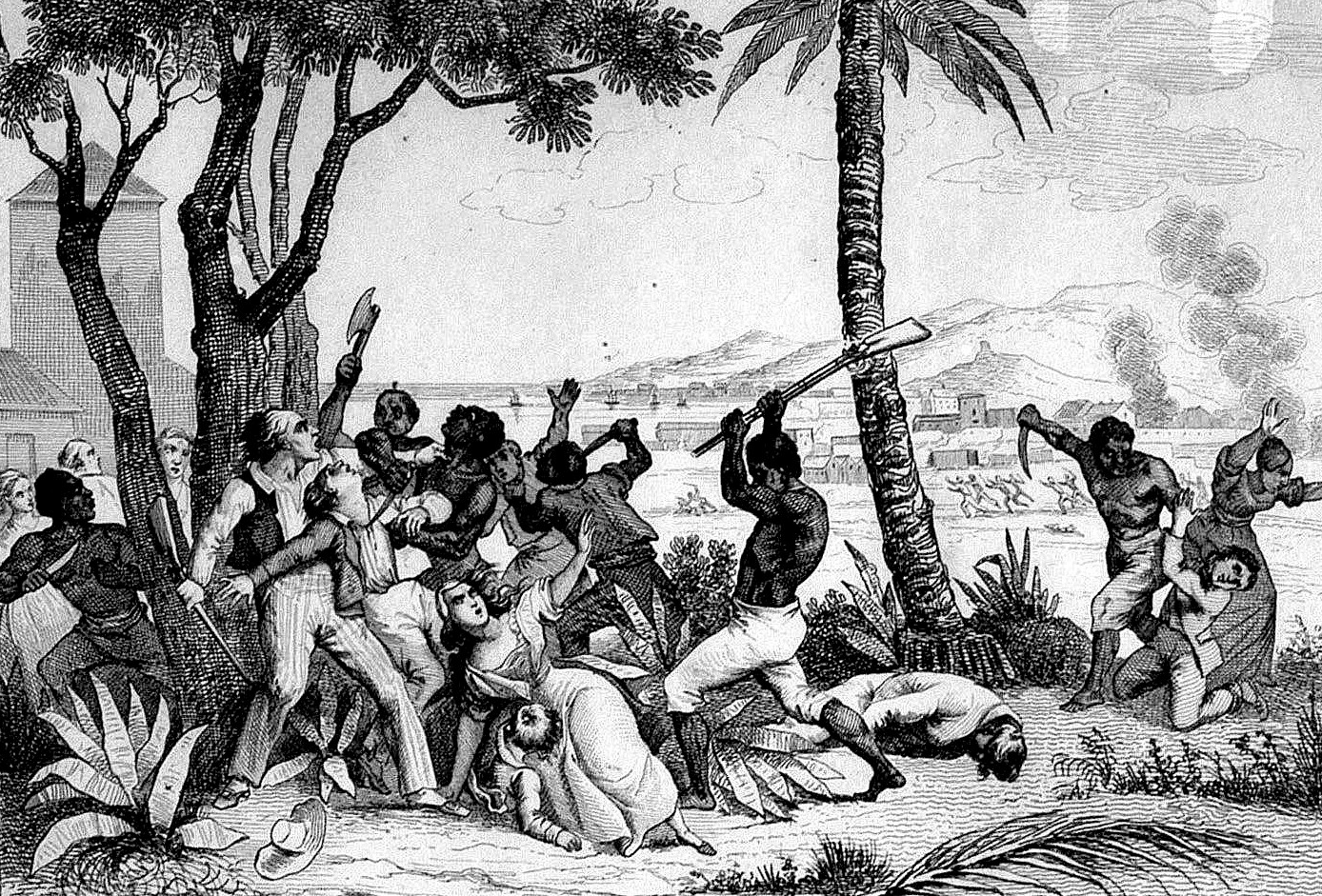
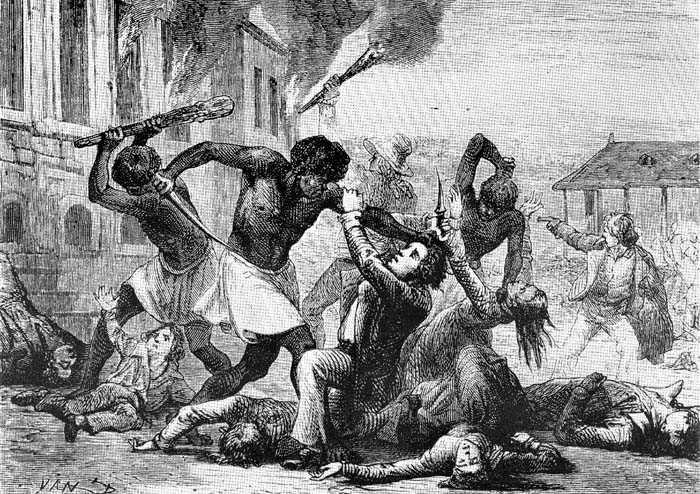
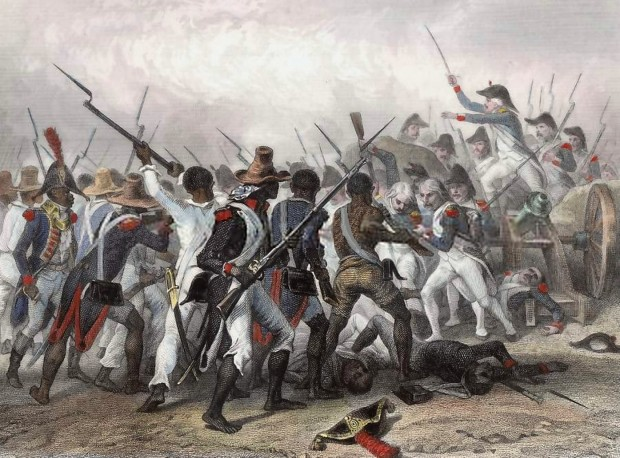
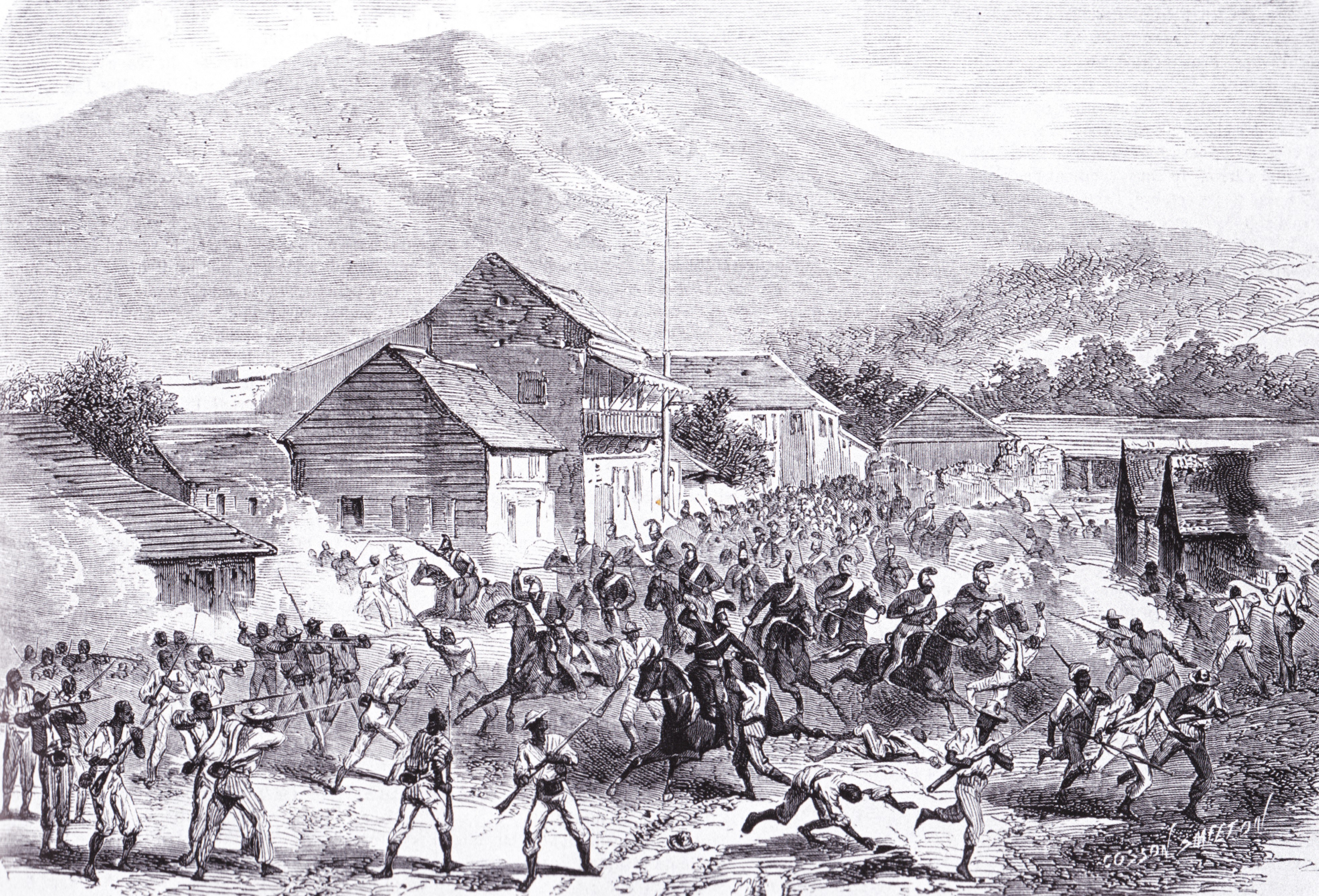
- Clockwise from top left: Illustration of the 1791 slave rebellion; Slaves killing white civilians, 1791; French cuirassiers attack Haitian rebels, c. 1801; Battle of Crête-à-Pierrot, 1803
Date	21 August 1791 – 1 January 1804 (12 years, 4 months, 1 week and 4 days)
Location	Hispaniola
Result	Afro-Haitian victory
Territorial changes	Independence and Establishment of the French Saint-Domingue as Haiti

Belligerents
Kingdom of France (1791–1792); French Republic (1792–1802)	(Kingdom of France) Royalist insurgent slaves (1791–1793); Spain (1793–1795); Great Britain (1793–1798) Colony of Saint-Domingue (1802); Indigenous Army (1802–1803); United Kingdom (1803-1804)

Commanders and leaders
Viscount de Blanchelande (executed); Léger-Félicité Sonthonax; Étienne Polverel; Étienne de Laveaux; Toussaint Louverture (1794-1802); André Rigaud; Alexandre Pétion; Jean-Jacques Dessalines (1794-1802); Charles Leclerc #; Donatien de Rochambeau; Villaret de Joyeuse	(Kingdom of France): Dutty Boukman †; Jean-François Papillon; Georges Biassou; Jeannot; Toussaint Louverture (1791–1794); Jean-Jacques Dessalines (1791–1794); John Whitelocke; Thomas Maitland; Toussaint Louverture (surrendered) #; Jean-Jacques Dessalines; Henri Christophe; Alexandre Pétion; François Capois

Casualties and losses
- Afro-Haitian slaves: 200,000 dead; British: 100,000 dead or wounded; French: 57,000–75,000 dead (37,000 KIA); White-Haitian colonists: 25,000 dead

The Haitian Revolution, (Note: Haitian Creole: Revolisyon ayisyen; French: Révolution haïtienne, [ʁevɔlysjɔ̃ a.isjɛn]) also known as the Haitian War of Independence, (Note: Haitian Creole: Lagè d Lendependans; French: Guerre de l'indépendance) was an armed conflict and insurrection by enslaved Black Africans against French colonial rule in Saint-Domingue, now the sovereign state of Haiti. The revolution is one of the only known slave rebellions in human history that led to the founding of a state which was both free from slavery (though not from forced labour) and ruled by former enslaved captives.

Vincent Ogé's 1790 revolt by free Mulattoes (of mixed French European and Black African ancestry) pressured the French Revolutionary government to grant them citizenship in May 1791, leading to further clashes with slave owners that had destabilized Saint-Domingue and led to the slave revolt on 21 August 1791, which ended with the former colony's independence on 1 January 1804, with the ex-slave Toussaint Louverture emerging as its most prominent general. The successful revolution was a defining moment in the history of the Atlantic World and the revolution's effects on the institution of slavery were felt throughout the Americas. The end of French rule and the abolition of slavery in the former colony was followed by a successful defense of the freedoms the former Black slaves had won with the collaboration with already free people of color, of their independence from Europeans.

The revolution, the largest slave uprising since Spartacus's unsuccessful revolt against the Roman Republic nearly 1,900 years earlier, shocked the Western world. It reshaped debates over slavery and strengthened the abolitionist cause. It also sparked revolts in nearby colonies while intensifying both repression and anti-slavery sentiment across the Atlantic. In its wake, a wide range of 19th-century writers sought to celebrate, appropriate, or dramatize the event.

Compared to other Atlantic revolutions, the events in Haiti have received relatively little public attention in retrospect: historian Michel-Rolph Trouillot characterizes the historiography of the Haitian Revolution as being "silenced" compared by that of the French Revolution. France did not officially recognize the independence of Haiti until 1825. As condition of French recognition, Haiti was required to pay an indemnity of 150 million Francs, imposing a heavy financial burden on the country.

== Background ==
=== Slave economy in Saint-Domingue ===
Much of the Caribbean economic development in the 18th century was contingent on Europeans' demand for sugar. Plantation owners produced sugar as a commodity crop from cultivation of sugarcane, which required extensive labor. The colony of Saint-Domingue also had extensive coffee, cocoa and indigo plantations, but these were smaller and less profitable than the sugar plantations. The commodity crops were traded in return for European goods.

Starting in the 1730s, French engineers constructed complex irrigation systems to increase sugarcane production. By the following decade, the French colony of Saint-Domingue, together with the British colony of Jamaica, had become the main suppliers of the world's sugar. Production of sugar depended on extensive manual labor provided by enslaved Black Africans. An average of 600 ships engaged every year in shipping products from Saint-Domingue to Bordeaux, France, and the value of the colony's crops and goods was almost equal in value to all of the products shipped from the Thirteen Colonies to Great Britain. The livelihood of 1 million of the approximately 25 million people who lived in France in 1789 depended directly upon the agricultural imports from Saint-Domingue, and several million indirectly depended upon trade from the colony to maintain their standard of living. Saint-Domingue was the most profitable French colony in the world, indeed one of the most profitable of all the European colonies in the 18th century.

Slavery sustained sugar production under harsh conditions; diseases such as malaria (brought from Africa) and the yellow fever caused high mortality, thriving in the tropical Caribbean climate. In 1787 alone, approximately 20,000 Black African slaves were transported from Africa to Saint-Domingue, in comparison to the roughly 38,000 slaves that were imported to the British West Indies. The death rate from yellow fever was such that at least 50% of the slaves from Africa died within a year of arriving, so the white planters preferred to work their slaves as hard as possible, providing them only the bare minimum of food and shelter; they calculated that it was better to get the most work out of their slaves with the lowest expense possible, since they were probably going to die of yellow fever anyway. The death rate was so high that polyandry—one woman being married to several men at the same time—developed as a common form of marriage among the slaves. As slaves had no legal rights, rape by planters, their unmarried sons or overseers was a common occurrence on the plantations.

=== Demographics ===
The largest sugar plantations and concentrations of slaves were in the north of the island, and the whites lived in fear of potential slave rebellion. Even by the standards of the Caribbean, French slave masters were extremely cruel in treatment of black slaves. They used the threat and acts of physical violence to maintain control and suppress efforts at rebellion. When black slaves left the plantations or disobeyed their masters, they were subject to whipping or to more extreme torture such as castration or burning, the punishment being both a personal lesson and a warning for other black slaves. The King Louis XIV passed the Code Noir in 1685 in an attempt to regulate such violence and the general treatment of black slaves in the colony, but white masters openly and consistently broke the code. During the 18th century, local legislation reversed parts of it.

In 1758, the white planters began passing legislation restricting the rights of other groups of people until a rigid caste system was established. Most historians classify the people of the era into three groups:

The first group were white colonists, or les blancs. This group was generally subdivided into the plantation owners and a lower class of whites who often served as overseers or day laborers, as well as artisans and shopkeepers.

The second group were free people of color, or gens de couleur libres, who were usually mixed-race, (sometimes referred to as Mulattoes), being of both Black African and French descent. These gens de couleur tended to be educated and literate, and the men often served in the army or as administrators on plantations. Many were children of white planters and enslaved mothers, or free women of color. Others had purchased their freedom from their owners through the sale of their own produce or artistic works. They often received education or artisan training, and sometimes inherited freedom or property from their fathers. Some gens de couleur owned and operated their own plantations and became slave owners.

The third group, outnumbering the others by a ratio of ten to one, was made up of mostly African-born Black slaves. A high rate of mortality among them meant that planters continually had to import new Black slaves. This kept their culture more Natively African and separate from other people on the island. Many plantations had large concentrations of slaves from a particular region of Africa, and it was therefore somewhat easier for these groups to maintain elements of their culture, religion, and language. This also separated new slaves from Africa from creoles (slaves born in the colony), who already had kin networks and often had more prestigious roles on plantations and more opportunities for emancipation. Most slaves spoke a patois of the French language known as Haitian Creole, which was also used by island-born Mulattoes and whites for communication with the workers.

The majority of the Black slaves were the Yoruba, from what is now modern Nigeria, Fon from what is now Benin, and Kongo from the Kingdom of Kongo in what is now modern northern Angola and the western Congo. The Kongolese at 40% were the largest of the African ethnic groups represented amongst the slaves. The slaves developed their own religion, a syncretic mixture of Catholicism and West African religions known as Vodou, usually called "voodoo" in English. This belief system implicitly rejected the Africans' status as slaves.

=== Social conflict ===
Saint-Domingue was a society seething with hatred, with white colonists and Black slaves frequently coming into violent conflict. The French historian Paul Fregosi wrote:

"Whites, mulattos and blacks loathed each other. The poor whites couldn't stand the rich whites, the rich whites despised the poor whites, the middle-class whites were jealous of the aristocratic whites, the whites born in France looked down upon the locally born whites, mulattoes envied the whites, despised the blacks and were despised by the whites; free Negroes brutalized those who were still slaves, Haitian born blacks regarded those from Africa as savages. Everyone—quite rightly—lived in terror of everyone else. Haiti was hell, but Haiti was rich."

— The French historian Paul Fregosi

Many of these conflicts involved slaves who had escaped the plantations. Many runaway slaves—called Maroons—hid on the margins of large plantations, living off the land and what they could steal from their former masters. Others fled to towns, to blend in with urban slaves and freed Blacks who often migrated to those areas for work. If caught, these runaway slaves would be severely and violently punished. However, some masters tolerated petit marronages, or short-term absences from plantations, knowing these allowed release of tensions.

The larger groups of runaway slaves who lived in the hillside woods away from white control often conducted violent raids on the island's sugar and coffee plantations. Although the numbers in these bands grew large (sometimes into the thousands), they generally lacked the leadership and strategy to accomplish large-scale objectives. The first effective Maroon leader to emerge was the charismatic Haitian Vodou priest François Mackandal, who inspired his people by drawing on African traditions and religions. He united the Maroon bands and established a network of secret organizations among plantation slaves, leading a rebellion from 1751 through 1757. Although Mackandal was captured by the French and burned at the stake in 1758, large armed Maroon bands persisted in raids and harassment after his death.

=== Slavery in Enlightenment thought ===
French writer Guillaume Raynal attacked slavery in his history of European colonization. He warned, "the Africans only want a chief, sufficiently courageous, to lead them on to vengeance and slaughter." Raynal's Enlightenment philosophy went deeper than a prediction and reflected many similar philosophies, including those of Rousseau and Diderot. Raynal's admonition was written thirteen years before the Declaration of the Rights of Man and of the Citizen, which highlighted freedom and liberty but did not abolish slavery.

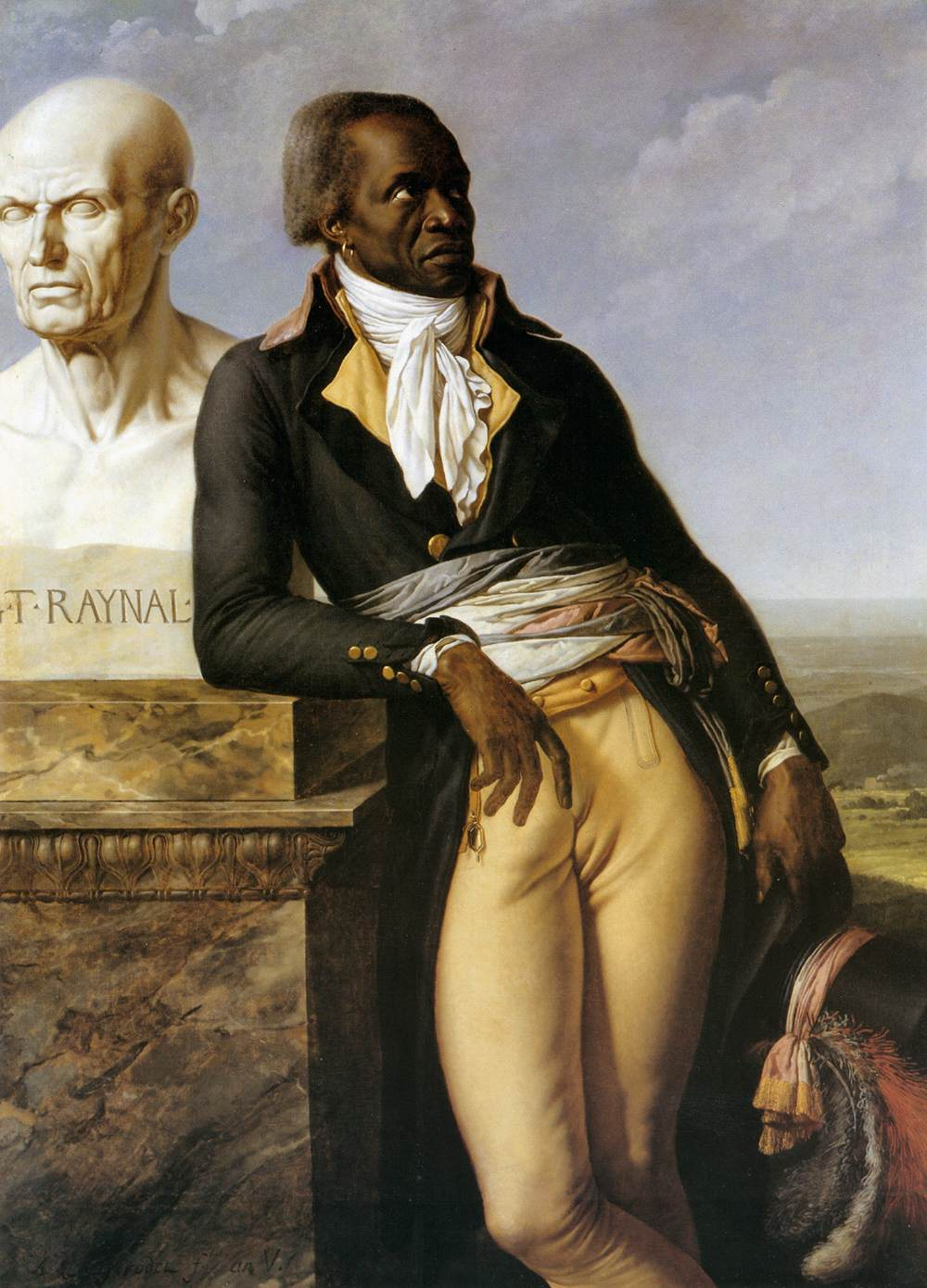
Portrait of Jean-Baptiste Belley by Anne-Louis Girodet de Roussy-Trioson, 1797

In addition to Raynal's influence, Toussaint Louverture, a free Black who was familiar with Enlightenment ideas within the context of European colonialism, would become a key "enlightened actor" in the Haitian Revolution. Enlightened thought divided the world into "enlightened leaders" and "ignorant masses." Louverture sought to bridge this divide between the popular masses and the enlightened few by striking a balance between Western Enlightened thought as a necessary means of winning liberation, and not propagating the notion that it was morally superior to the experiences and knowledge of people of color on Saint-Domingue. Louverture wrote a constitution for a new society in Saint-Domingue that abolished slavery. The existence of slavery in Enlightened society was an incongruity that had been left unaddressed by European scholars prior to the French Revolution. Louverture took on this inconsistency directly in his constitution. In addition, he exhibited a connection to Enlightenment scholars through the style, language,and accent of his text.

Like Louverture, Jean-Baptiste Belley was an active participant in the insurrection. The portrait of Belley by Anne-Louis Girodet de Roussy-Trioson depicts a man who encompasses the French view of its colonies, creating a stark dichotomy between the refinement of Enlightenment thought and the reality of the situation in Saint-Domingue, through the bust of Raynal and the figure of Belley, respectively. While distinguished, the portrait still portrays a man trapped by the confines of race. Girodet's portrayal of the former National Convention deputy is telling of the French opinion of colonial citizens by emphasizing the subject's sexuality and including an earring. Both of these racially charged symbols reveal the desire to undermine the colony's attempts at independent legitimacy, as citizens of the colonies were not able to access the elite class of French Revolutionaries because of their race.

== Situation in 1789 ==
=== Social stratification ===
In 1789, Saint-Domingue produced 60% of the world's coffee and 40% of the sugar imported by France and Britain. The colony was not only the most profitable possession of the French colonial empire, but it was the wealthiest and most prosperous colony in the Caribbean.

The colony's white population numbered 40,000; Mulattoes and free Blacks, 28,000; and Black slaves, an estimated 452,000. This was almost half the total slave population in the Caribbean, estimated at one million that year. Enslaved Blacks, regarded as the lowest class of colonial society, outnumbered whites and free people of color by a margin of almost eight to one.

Two-thirds of the Black slaves were African born, and they tended to be less submissive than those born in the Americas and raised in slave societies. The death rate in the Caribbean exceeded the birth rate, so imports of enslaved Black Africans were deemed necessary to maintain the numbers required to work the plantations. The slave population declined at an annual rate of two to five percent, due to overwork, inadequate food and shelter, insufficient clothing and medical care, and an imbalance between the sexes, with more men than women. Some slaves were of a creole elite class of urban slaves and domestics, who worked as cooks, personal servants and artisans around the plantation house. This relatively privileged class was chiefly born in the Americas, while the under-class born in Africa labored hard, and often under abusive and brutal conditions.

Among Saint-Domingue's 40,000 white colonists, European-born Frenchmen monopolized administrative posts. The sugar planters, or grands blancs (literally, "big whites"), were chiefly minor aristocrats. Most returned to France as soon as possible, hoping to avoid the dreaded yellow fever, which regularly swept the colony. The lower-class whites, petits blancs (literally "small whites"), included artisans, shopkeepers, slave dealers, overseers, and day laborers.

Saint-Domingue's free people of color, or gens de couleur libres, numbered more than 28,000. Around that time, colonial legislatures, concerned with this growing and strengthening population, passed discriminatory laws that required these freedmen to wear distinctive clothing and limited where they could live. These laws also barred them from occupying many public offices. Many freedmen were also artisans and overseers, or domestic servants in the plantation houses. Le Cap Français (Le Cap), a northern port, had a large population of free people of color, including freed slaves. These men would become important leaders in the slave rebellion and later revolution.

=== Regional conflicts ===
Saint-Domingue's Northern province was the center of shipping and trading, and had the largest population of grands blancs. The Plaine-du-Nord on the northern shore of Saint-Domingue was the most fertile area, having the largest sugar plantations and therefore the most slaves. It was the area of greatest economic importance, especially as most of the colony's trade went through these ports. The largest and busiest port was Le Cap, the former capital of Saint-Domingue. Enslaved Africans in this region lived in large groups of workers in relative isolation, separated from the rest of the colony by the high mountain range known as the Massif du Nord.

The Western province, however, grew significantly after the colonial capital was moved to Port-au-Prince in 1751, becoming increasingly wealthy in the second half of the 18th century. The Southern province lagged in population and wealth because it was geographically separated from the rest of the colony. However, this isolation allowed freed slaves to find profit in trade with Jamaica, and they gained power and wealth here. In addition to these interregional tensions, there were conflicts between proponents of independence, those loyal to France, and allies of Britain and Spain—who coveted control of the valuable colony.

== Effects of the French Revolution ==
After the establishment of the French First Republic, the National Assembly made radical changes to French laws and, on 26 August 1789, published the Declaration of the Rights of Man and of the Citizen, declaring all men free and equal. The Declaration was ambiguous as to whether this equality applied to women, slaves, or citizens of the colonies, and thus influenced the desire for freedom and equality in Saint-Domingue. White planters saw it as an opportunity to gain independence from France, which would allow them to take control of the island and create trade regulations that would further their own wealth and power. However, the Haitian Revolution quickly became a test of the new French republic, as it radicalized the slavery question and forced French leaders to recognize the full meaning of their stated ideology.

The African population on the island began to hear of the agitation for independence by the planters, who had resented France's limitations on the island's foreign trade. The Africans mostly allied with the royalists and the British, as they understood that if Saint-Domingue's independence were to be led by white slave masters, it would probably mean even harsher treatment and increased injustice for the African population. The planters would be free to operate slavery as they pleased without the existing minimal accountability to their French peers.

Saint-Domingue's free people of color, most notably Julien Raimond, had been actively appealing to France for full civil equality with whites since the 1780s. Raimond used the French Revolution to make this the major colonial issue before the National Assembly. In October 1790, another wealthy free man of color, Vincent Ogé, demanded the right to vote under the Declaration of the Rights of Man and of the Citizen. When the colonial governor refused, Ogé led a brief 300-man insurgency in the area around Le Cap, fighting to end racial discrimination in the area. He was captured in early 1791, and brutally executed by being "broken on the wheel" before being beheaded. While Ogé was not fighting against slavery, his treatment was cited by later slave rebels as one of the factors in their decision to rise up in August 1791 and resist treaties with the colonists. The conflict up to this point was between factions of whites, and between whites and free people of color. Enslaved Blacks watched from the sidelines.

Leading 18th-century French writer Count Mirabeau had once said the Saint-Domingue whites "slept at the foot of Vesuvius", suggesting the grave threat they faced should the majority of slaves launch a sustained major uprising.

== 1791 slave rebellion ==
=== Onset of the revolution ===
Guillaume Raynal attacked slavery in the 1780 edition of his history of European colonization. He also predicted a general slave revolt in the colonies, saying that there were signs of "the impending storm". One such sign was the action of the French revolutionary government to grant citizenship to wealthy free people of color in May 1791. Since white planters refused to comply with this decision, within two months isolated fighting broke out between the Mulattoes and the whites. This added to the tense climate between Mulattoes and grands blancs. Meanwhile, enslaved Black people, already resentful of both whites and Mulattoes for maintaining the system of bondage, began to see their own opportunity for rebellion.

Raynal's prediction came true on the night of 21 August 1791, when the slaves of Saint-Domingue rose in revolt; thousands of slaves attended a secret vodou ceremony as a tropical storm came in – the lightning and the thunder were taken as auspicious omens – and later that night, the slaves began to kill their masters and plunged the colony into civil war. The signal to begin the revolt had been given by Dutty Boukman, a high priest of vodou and leader of the Maroon slaves, and Cecile Fatiman during a religious ceremony at Bois Caïman on the night of 14 August. Within the next ten days, slaves had taken control of the entire Northern Province in an unprecedented slave revolt. Whites kept control of only a few isolated, fortified camps. The slaves sought revenge on their masters through "pillage, rape, torture, mutilation, and death". The long years of oppression by the planters had left many Blacks with a hatred of all whites, and the revolt was marked by extreme violence from the very start. The masters and mistresses were dragged from their beds to be killed, and the heads of French children were placed on pikes that were carried at the front of the rebel columns. In the south, beginning in September, thirteen thousand slaves and rebels led by Romaine-la-Prophétesse, based in Trou Coffy, took supplies from and burned plantations, freed slaves, and occupied (and burned) the area's two major cities, Léogâne and Jacmel.

The planters had long feared such a revolt, and were well armed with some defensive preparations. But within weeks, the number of slaves who joined the revolt in the north reached 100,000. Within the next two months, as the violence escalated, the slaves killed 4,000 whites and burned or destroyed 180 sugar plantations and hundreds of coffee and indigo plantations. At least 900 coffee plantations were destroyed, and the total damage inflicted over the next two weeks amounted to 2 million francs. In September 1791, the surviving whites organized into militias and struck back, killing about 15,000 Blacks.

Though demanding freedom from slavery, the rebels did not demand independence from France at this point. Most of the rebel leaders professed to be fighting for the king of France, who they believed had issued a decree freeing the slaves, which had been suppressed by the colonial governor. As such, they were demanding their rights as Frenchmen which had been granted by the king.

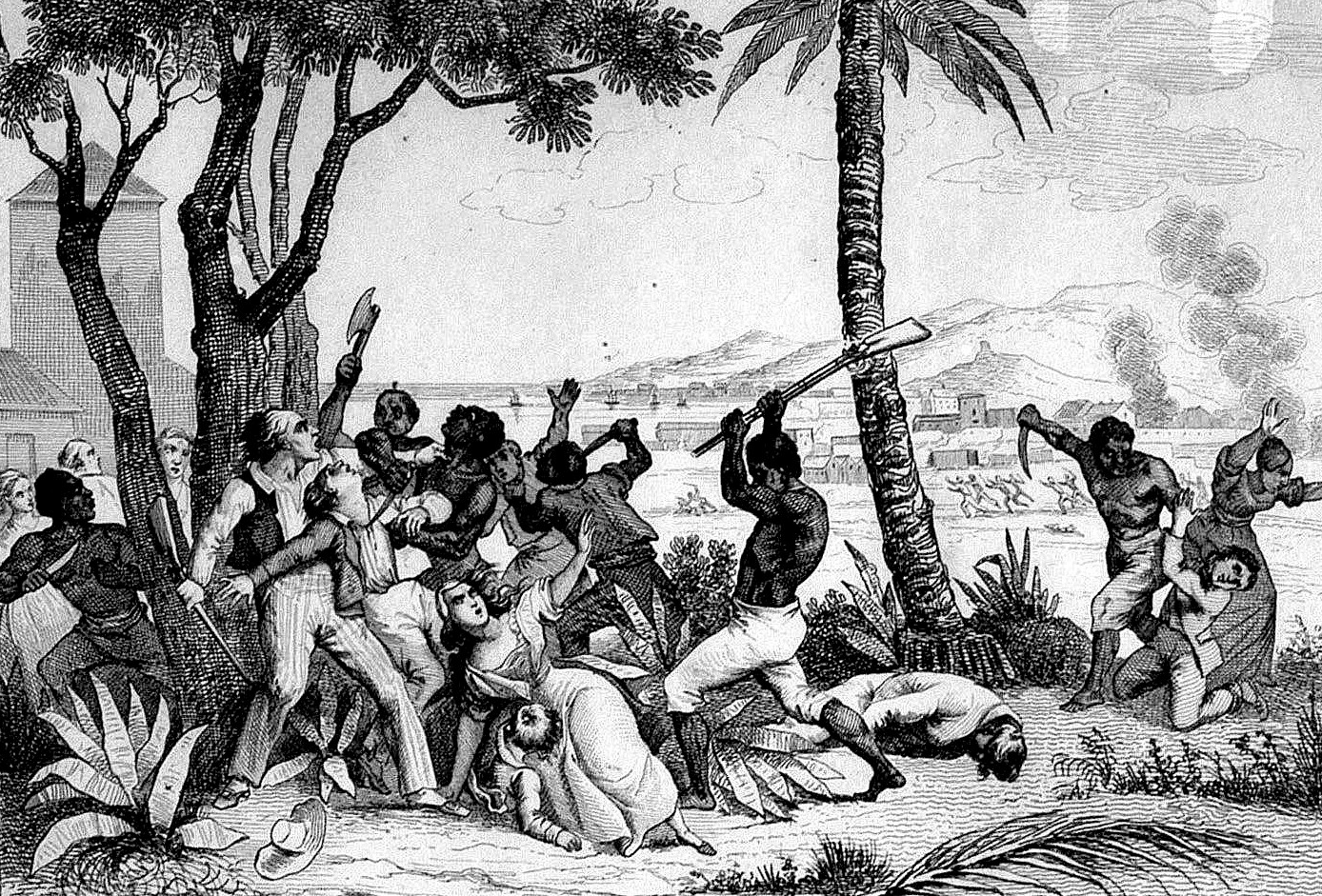
Slave rebellion of 1791

By 1792, slave rebels controlled a third of Saint-Domingue. The success of the rebellion caused the National Assembly to realize it was facing an ominous situation. The Assembly granted civil and political rights to free men of color in the colonies in March 1792. Countries throughout Europe, as well as the United States, were shocked by the decision, but the Assembly was determined to stop the revolt. Apart from granting rights to free people of color, the Assembly dispatched 6,000 French soldiers to the island. A new governor sent by Paris, Léger-Félicité Sonthonax, abolished slavery in the Northern Province and had hostile relations with the planters, whom he saw as royalists. The same month, a coalition of whites, factions of wealthy free Blacks, and forces under French commissaire nationale Edmond de Saint-Léger put down the Trou Coffy uprising in the south, after André Rigaud, then based near Port-au-Prince, declined to ally with them.

=== Britain and Spain enter the conflict ===
Meanwhile, in 1793, France declared war on Great Britain. The grands blancs in Saint-Domingue, unhappy with Sonthonax, pleaded with British authorities in Jamaica for assistance against the Republican commissioners. The first Pitt ministry of Great Britain, in particular Prime Minister William Pitt the Younger and Secretary of State for War Henry Dundas, made plans to invade Saint-Domingue. Both men recognised the financial value of the colony and its status as a useful bargaining chip in possible peace negotiations with France. Furthermore, they were concerned the ongoing slave rebellion in Saint-Domingue could lead to similar unrest in the British West Indies. Dundas instructed Sir Adam Williamson, the lieutenant-governor of Jamaica, to sign an agreement with representatives of counterrevolutionary French colonists in the colony which promised to restore the ancien régime, discrimination against free people of color and protect slavery, a move that drew criticism from British abolitionists William Wilberforce and Thomas Clarkson. The troops who came to Saint-Domingue from Britain had an extremely low survival rate, often dying to diseases such as yellow fever. The British government would send less trained adolescents to maintain strong regiments. The incompetence of the new soldiers, combined with the ravaging of disease upon the army, led to a very unsuccessful campaign in Saint-Domingue. The American journalist James Perry notes that the great irony of the British campaign in Saint-Domingue was that it ended as a complete debacle, costing the British treasury millions of pounds and the British military thousands upon thousands of dead, all for nothing.

Spain, which controlled the rest of the island of Hispaniola (Santo Domingo), also joined the conflict and fought with Britain against France. The proportion of slaves was not as high in the Spanish portion of the island. Spanish forces invaded Saint-Domingue and were joined by the rebels. For most of the conflict, the British and Spanish supplied the rebels with food, ammunition, arms, medicine, naval support, and military advisors. By August 1793, there were only 3,500 French soldiers on the island. On 20 September 1793, about 600 British soldiers from Jamaica landed at Jérémie to be greeted with shouts of, "Vivent les Anglais!" from the French population. On 22 September 1793, Mole St. Nicolas, the main French naval base in Saint-Domingue, surrendered to the Royal Navy peacefully.

=== French declare slavery abolished ===
To prevent military disaster, and secure the colony for republican France as opposed to Britain, Spain, and French royalists, separately or in combination, the French commissioners Sonthonax and Étienne Polverel offered freedom to the slaves who would agree to fight alongside them. Then, under pressure, they gradually emancipated all the slaves of the colony. On 29 August 1793, Sonthonax proclaimed the abolition of slavery in the northern province. On 31 October, Étienne Polverel did the same in the other two western and southern provinces.

Sonthonax sent three of his deputies, namely the colonist Louis Duffay, the free Black army officer Jean-Baptiste Belley and a free man of color, Jean-Baptiste Mills, to seek the National Convention's endorsement for the emancipation of slaves near the end of January 1794. On 4 February, Dufay gave a speech to the convention arguing that abolishing slavery was the only way to keep the colony in control of the French, and that former slaves would willingly work to restore the colony. The convention deputies agreed and made the dramatic decree that "slavery of the Blacks is abolished in all the colonies; consequently, it decrees that all men living in the colonies, without distinction of color, are French citizens and enjoy all the rights guaranteed by the constitution".

The National Convention abolished slavery by law in France and all its colonies, and granted civil and political rights to all Black men in the colonies. The French constitutions of 1793 and 1795 both included the abolition of slavery. The constitution of 1793 never went into effect, but that of 1795 did; it lasted until it was replaced by the consular and imperial constitutions under Napoleon Bonaparte. Despite racial tensions in Saint-Domingue, the French revolutionary government at the time welcomed abolition with a show of idealism and optimism. The emancipation of slaves was viewed as an example of liberty for other countries, much as the American Revolution was meant to serve as the first of many liberation movements. Georges Danton, one of the Frenchmen present at the meeting of the National Convention, expressed this sentiment:

Representatives of the French people, until now our decrees of liberty have been selfish, and only for ourselves. But today we proclaim it to the universe, and generations to come will glory in this decree; we are proclaiming universal liberty ... We are working for future generations; let us launch liberty into the colonies; the English are dead, today.

In nationalistic terms, the abolition of slavery also served as a moral triumph of France over England, as seen in the latter half of the above quote. Yet Toussaint Louverture did not stop working with the Spanish Army until sometime later, as he was suspicious of the French.

The British force that landed in Saint-Domingue in 1793 was too small to conquer the colony, being capable only of holding only few coastal enclaves. The French planters were disappointed as they had hoped to regain power; Sonthonax was relieved, as he had twice refused ultimatums from Commodore John Ford to surrender Port-au-Prince. In the meantime, a Spanish force under Captain-General Joaquín García y Moreno had marched into the Northern Province. Louverture, the ablest of the Haitian generals, had joined the Spanish, accepting an officer's commission in the Spanish Army and being made a knight in the Order of St. Isabella.

The main British force for the conquest of Saint-Domingue under General Charles Grey, nicknamed "No-flint Grey", and Admiral Sir John Jervis set sail from Portsmouth on 26 November 1793, which was in defiance of the well-known rule that the only time that one could campaign in the West Indies was from September to November, when the mosquitoes that carried malaria and yellow fever were scarce. After arriving in the West Indies in February 1794, Grey chose to conquer Martinique, Saint Lucia, and Guadeloupe. Troops under the command of John Whyte did not arrive in Saint-Domingue until 19 May 1794. Rather than attacking the main French bases at Le Cap and Port-de-Paix, Whyte chose to march towards Port-au-Prince, whose harbour was reported to have forty-five ships loaded with sugar. Whyte took Port-au-Prince, but Sonthonax and the French forces were allowed to leave in exchange for not burning the sugar-loaded ships. By May 1794, the French forces were severed in two by Toussaint, with Sonthonax commanding in the north and André Rigaud leading in the south. As slavery continued to exist in areas of Saint-Domingue under British occupation, the colony's Black residents were motivated to fight against them on the side of the French.

=== Spanish depart Saint Domingue ===
In May 1794, Toussaint suddenly joined the French and turned against the Spanish, ambushing his allies as they emerged from attending mass in a church at San Raphael on 6 May 1794. The Haitians soon expelled the Spanish from Saint-Domingue. Toussaint proved to be forgiving of the whites, insisting that he was fighting to assert the rights of the slaves as Black French people to be free. He said he did not seek independence from France, and urged the surviving whites, including the former slave masters, to stay and work with him in rebuilding Saint-Domingue.

Rigaud had checked the British in the south, taking the town of Léogâne by storm and driving the British back to Port-au-Prince. During the course of 1794, most of the British forces were killed by yellow fever, the dreaded "Black vomit" as the British called it. Within two months of arriving in Saint-Domingue, the British lost 40 officers and 600 men to yellow fever. Of Grey's 7,000 men, about 5,000 died of yellow fever while the Royal Navy reported losing "forty-six masters and eleven hundred men dead, chiefly of yellow fever". The British historian Sir John Fortescue wrote, "It is probably beneath the mark to say that twelve thousand Englishmen were buried in the West Indies in 1794". Rigaud failed in attempt to retake Port-au-Prince, but on Christmas Day 1794, he stormed and retook Tiburon in a surprise attack. The British lost about 300 men, and Rigaud's forces took no prisoners, summarily executing any soldier or sailor they captured.

=== British "great push" ===
At this point, Pitt decided to launch what he called "the great push" to conquer Saint-Domingue and the rest of the French West Indies, sending out the largest expedition Britain had yet mounted in its history, a force of about 30,000 men to be carried in 200 ships. Fortescue wrote that the aim of the British in the first expedition had been to destroy "the power of France in these pestilent islands ... only to discover when it was too late, that they practically destroyed the British army". By this point, it was well known that service in the West Indies was virtually a death sentence. In Dublin and Cork, soldiers from the 104th, 105th, 111th, and 112th regiments rioted when they learned that they were being sent to Saint-Domingue. The fleet for the "great push" left Portsmouth on 16 November 1795 and was wrecked by a storm, before sending out again on 9 December. The overall forces in St Domingue was at that time under the command of the lieutenant-governor of Jamaica, Sir Adam Williamson. He was optimistically given the title "Governor of St Domingue", and among his British forces were Jamaican "Black Shot" militias.

General Ralph Abercromby, the commander of the forces committed to the "great push", hesitated over which island to attack when he arrived in Barbados on 17 March 1796. He dispatched a force under Major General Gordon Forbes to Port-au-Prince. Forbes's attempt to take the French-held city of Léogâne ended in disaster. The French had built a deep defensive ditch with palisades and Forbes had neglected to bring along heavy artillery. The French commander, Mulatto general Alexandre Pétion, proved to be an excellent artilleryman, who used the guns of his fort to disable two of the three ships of the line under Admiral Hyde Parker in the harbour, before turning his guns to a nearby British field battery; a French sortie led to a rout of Forbes' troops, who retreated back to Port-au-Prince. As more ships arrived with British troops, more soldiers died of yellow fever. By 1 June 1796, of the 1,000 from the 66th Regiment, only 198 had not been infected with yellow fever; and of the 1,000 men of the 69th Regiment, only 515 were not infected with yellow fever. Abercromby predicted that at the current rate of yellow fever infection, all of the men from the two regiments were dead by November. Ultimately, 10,000 British soldiers arrived in Saint Domingue by June, but aside from some skirmishing near Bombarde, the British remained in Port-au-Prince and other coastal enclaves, while yellow fever continued to ravage them. The government attracted criticism in the House of Commons about the mounting costs of the expedition to Saint-Domingue. In February 1797, General John Graves Simcoe arrived to replace Forbes with orders to pull back British forces to Port-au-Prince. As the human and financial costs of the expedition mounted, the British public demanded a withdrawal from Saint-Domingue, which was devouring money and soldiers, while failing to produce the expected profits.

On 11 April 1797, Colonel Thomas Maitland of the 62nd Regiment of Foot landed in Port-au-Prince, and wrote in a letter to his brother that British forces in Saint-Domingue had been "annihilated" by yellow fever. Service in Saint-Domingue was extremely unpopular in the British Army owing to the terrible death toll caused by yellow fever. One British officer wrote of his horror of seeing his friends "drowned in their own blood" while "some died raving Mad". Simcoe used the new British troops to push back French troops, but in a counter-offensive, Toussaint and Rigaud stopped the offensive. Toussaint retook the fortress at Mirebalais. On 7 June 1797, Toussaint attacked Fort Churchill in an assault that was as noted for its professionalism as for its ferocity. Under a storm of artillery, his troops placed ladders on the walls and were driven back four times, with heavy losses. Even though Toussaint had been repulsed, the British were astonished that he had turned a group of former slaves with no military experience into troops whose skills were the equal of a European army.

=== British withdrawal ===
In July 1797, Simcoe and Maitland sailed to London to advise a total withdrawal from Saint-Domingue. In March 1798 Maitland returned with a mandate to withdraw, at least from Port-au-Prince. On 10 May 1798, Maitland met with Toussaint to agree to an armistice, and on 18 May the British left Port-au-Prince. The British forces were reduced to only holding the western peninsular towns of Mole St Nicholas in the north and Jeremie in the south. The new governor of Jamaica, Alexander Lindsay, 6th Earl of Balcarres, urged Maitland not to withdraw from Mole St Nicholas. However, Toussaint sent a message to Balcarres, warning him that if he persisted, to remember that Jamaica was not far from St Domingue, and could be invaded.

Maitland knew that his forces could not defeat Toussaint, and that he had to take action to protect Jamaica from invasion. British morale had collapsed with the news that Toussaint had taken Port-au-Prince, and Maitland decided to abandon all of Saint-Domingue, writing that the expedition had become such a complete disaster that withdrawal was the only sensible thing to do, even though he did not have the authority to do so. On 31 August, Maitland and Toussaint signed an agreement whereby in exchange for the British pulling out of all of Saint-Domingue, Toussaint promised not to "meddle in the affairs of Jamaica". Rigaud took control of Jeremie without any cost to his forces, as Maitland withdrew his southern forces to Jamaica. In the end of 1798, Maitland withdrew the last of his forces from Mole St Nicholas, as Toussaint took command of the fortress. Maitland disbanded his "Black Shot" troops and left them in Saint-Domingue, fearing they might return to Jamaica and cause further unrest. Many of them subsequently joined Toussaint's army.

=== Toussaint consolidates control ===
After the departure of the British, Toussaint turned his attention to Rigaud, who was conspiring against him in the south of Saint Domingue. In June 1799, Rigaud initiated the War of the South against Toussaint's rule, sending a brutal offensive at Petit-Goâve and Grand-Goâve. Taking no prisoners, Rigaud's predominantly Mulatto forces put Blacks and whites to the sword. Though the United States was hostile towards Toussaint, the U.S. Navy agreed to support Toussaint's forces with the frigate USS General Greene, commanded by Captain Christopher Perry, providing fire support to the Blacks as Toussaint laid siege to the city of Jacmel, held by Mulatto forces under the command of Rigaud. To the United States, Rigaud's ties to France represented a threat to American commerce. On 11 March 1800, Toussaint took Jacmel and Rigaud fled on the French schooner La Diana. Though Toussaint maintained he was still loyal to France, to all intents and purposes, he ruled Saint Domingue as its dictator.

== Leadership of Louverture ==
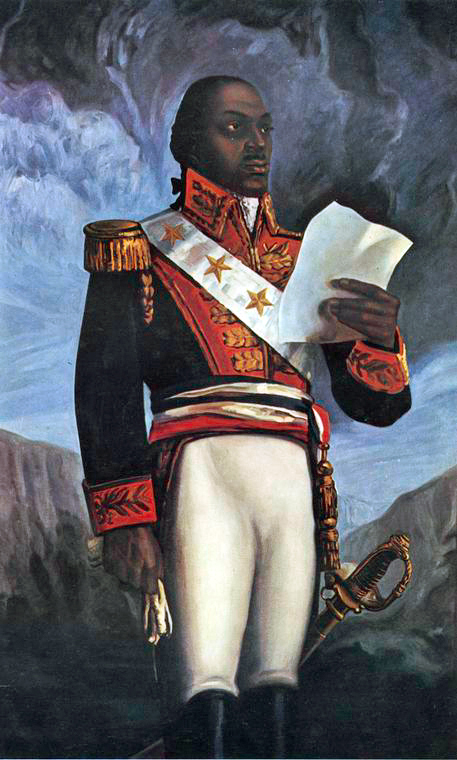
General Toussaint Louverture

=== Toussaint Louverture ===
Toussaint Louverture, although a self-educated former domestic slave, was one of the most successful Black commanders. Like Jean François and Biassou, he initially fought for the Spanish crown. After the British had invaded Saint-Domingue, Louverture decided to fight for the French if they would agree to free all the slaves. Sonthonax had proclaimed an end to slavery on 29 August 1792. Louverture worked with a French general, Étienne Laveaux, to ensure that all slaves would be freed. Louverture abandoned the Spanish Army in the east and brought his forces over to the French side on 6 May 1794 after the Spanish refused to take steps to end slavery.

Under the military leadership of Toussaint, the former slaves succeeded in winning concessions from the British and expelled the Spanish forces. In the end, Toussaint essentially restored control of Saint-Domingue to France. Having made himself master of the island, however, Toussaint did not wish to surrender too much power to France. He began to rule the country as an effectively autonomous entity. Louverture overcame a succession of local rivals, including: the Commissioner Sonthonax, a French white man who gained support from many Haitians, angering Louverture; André Rigaud, a free man of color who fought to keep control of the South in the War of the South; and Comte d'Hédouville, who forced a fatal wedge between Rigaud and Louverture before escaping to France. Louverture led an invasion of neighboring Santo Domingo (December 1800), and freed the slaves there on 3 January 1801.

In 1801, Louverture issued a constitution for Saint-Domingue that decreed he would be governor-for-life and called for Black autonomy and a sovereign Black state. In response, Napoleon Bonaparte dispatched a large expeditionary force of French soldiers and warships to the island, led by Bonaparte's brother-in-law Charles Leclerc, to restore French rule. They were under secret instructions to restore slavery, at least in the formerly Spanish-held part of the island. Bonaparte ordered that Toussaint was to be treated with respect until the French forces were established; once that was done, Toussaint was to be summoned to Le Cap and arrested; if he failed to show, Leclerc was to wage "a war to the death" with no mercy and all of Toussaint's followers to be shot when captured. Once that was completed, slavery would be ultimately restored. The numerous French soldiers were accompanied by Mulatto troops led by Alexandre Pétion and André Rigaud, Mulatto leaders who had been defeated by Toussaint three years earlier.

=== Napoleon invades Haiti ===
The French arrived on 2 February 1802 at Le Cap with the Haitian commander Henri Christophe being ordered by Leclerc to turn over the city to the French. When Christophe refused, the French assaulted Le Cap and the Haitians set the city afire rather than surrender it. Leclerc sent Toussaint letters promising him: "Have no worries about your personal fortune. It will be safeguarded for you, since it has been only too well earned by your own efforts. Do not worry about the liberty of your fellow citizens". When Toussaint still failed to appear at Le Cap, Leclerc issued a proclamation on 17 February 1802: "General Toussaint and General Christophe are outlawed; all citizens are ordered to hunt them down, and treat them as rebels against the French Republic". Captain Marcus Rainsford, a British Army officer who visited Saint-Domingue observed the training of the Haitian Army, writing: "At a whistle, a whole brigade ran three or four hundred yards, and then, separating, threw themselves flat on the ground, changing to their backs and sides, and all the time keeping up a strong fire until recalled. This movement was executed with such facility and precision as totally to prevent cavalry from charging them in bushy and hilly country".

=== Haitian resistance and scorched-earth tactics ===
In a letter to Jean-Jacques Dessalines, Toussaint outlined his plans for defeating the French using scorched-earth: "Do not forget, while waiting for the rainy season which will rid us of our foes, that we have no other resource than destruction and fire. Bear in mind that the soil bathed with our sweat must not furnish our enemies with the smallest sustenance. Tear up the roads with shot; throw corpses and horses into all the foundations, burn and annihilate everything in order that those who have come to reduce us to slavery may have before their eyes the image of the hell which they deserve". Dessalines never received the letter as he had already taken to the field, evaded a French column sent to capture him and stormed Léogâne. The Haitians burned down Léogâne and killed all of the French with the Trinidadian historian C. L. R. James writing of Dessalines's actions at Léogâne: "Men, women and children, indeed all the whites who came into his hands, he massacred. And forbidding burial, he left stacks of corpses rotting in the sun to strike terror into the French detachments as they toiled behind his flying columns". The French had been expecting the Haitians to happily go back to being their slaves, as they believed it was natural for Blacks to be the slaves of whites, and were stunned to learn how much the Haitians hated them for wanting to reduce them back to a life in chains. A visibly shocked General Pamphile de Lacroix after seeing the ruins of Léogâne wrote: "They heaped up bodies" which "still had their attitudes; they were bent over, their hands outstretched and beseeching; the ice of death had not effaced the look on their faces".

Leclerc ordered four French columns to march on Gonaives, which was the main Haitian base. One of the French columns was commanded by General Donatien de Rochambeau, who sought to aggressively restore French colonial rule and re-impose the institution of slavery. Toussaint attempted to halt Rochambeau's advance at Ravine-à-Couleuvre, a narrow mountain canyon where Haitian forces had blocked the path with cut trees. In the ensuing Battle of Ravine-à-Couleuvres, after six hours of fierce hand-to-hand fighting with no quarter given on either side, the French finally broke through, albeit with heavy losses. During the battle, Toussaint personally took part in the fighting to lead his men in charges against the French. Toussaint ordered a retreat after the loss of 800 men.

=== Crête-à-Pierrot fortress ===
The Haitians next tried to stop the French at a British-built fort up in the mountains called Crête-à-Pierrot, a battle that is remembered as a national epic in Haiti. While Toussaint took to the field, he left Dessalines in command of Crête-à-Pierrot, who from his fastness could see three French columns converging on the fort. Dessalines appeared before his men standing atop of a barrel of gunpowder, holding a lit torch, saying, "We are going to be attacked, and if the French put their feet in here, I shall blow everything up", leading his men to reply "We shall die for liberty!". The first of the French columns to appear before the fort was commanded by General Jean Boudet, whose men were harassed by skirmishers until they reached a deep ditch the Haitians had dug. As the French tried to cross the ditch, Dessalines ordered his men who were hiding to come out and open fire, hitting the French with a tremendous volley of artillery and musket fire, inflicting heavy losses on the attackers. General Boudet himself was wounded and as the French dead and wounded started to pile up in the ditch, the French retreated. The next French commander who tried to assault the ditch was General Charles Dugua, joined shortly afterwards by the column commanded by Leclerc. All of the French assaults ended in total failure, and after the failure of their last attack, the Haitians charged the French, cutting down any Frenchmen. General Dugua was killed, Leclerc was wounded and the French lost about 800 dead. The final French column to arrive was the one commanded by Rochambeau, who brought along heavy artillery that knocked out the Haitian artillery, though his attempt to storm the ditch also ended in failure with about 300 of his men killed. Over the following days, the French kept on bombarding and assaulting the fort, only to be repulsed every time while the Haitians defiantly sang songs of the French Revolution, celebrating the right of all men to be equal and free. The Haitian psychological warfare was successful with many French soldiers asking why they were fighting to enslave the Haitians, who were only asserting the rights promised by the Revolution to make all men free. Despite Bonaparte's attempt to keep his intention to restore slavery a secret, it was widely believed by both sides that was why the French had returned to Haiti, as a sugar plantation could only be profitable with slave labour. Finally after twenty days of siege with food and ammunition running out, Dessalines ordered his men to abandon the fort on the night of 24 March 1802 and the Haitians slipped out of the fort to fight another day. Even Rochambeau, who hated all Blacks was forced to admit in a report: "Their retreat—this miraculous retreat from our trap—was an incredible feat of arms". The French had won, but they had lost 2,000 dead against an opponent whom they held in contempt on racial grounds, believing all Blacks to be stupid and cowardly, and furthermore, that it was shortages of food and ammunition that forced the Haitians to retreat, not because of any feats of arms by the French army.

After the Battle of Crête-à-Pierrot, the Haitians abandoned conventional warfare and reverted to guerrilla tactics, making the French hold over much of the countryside from Le Cap down to the Artibonite valley very tenuous. With March, the rainy season came to Saint-Domingue, and as stagnant water collected, the mosquitoes began to breed, leading to yet another outbreak of yellow fever. By the end of March, 5,000 French soldiers had died of yellow fever and another 5,000 were hospitalized with yellow fever, leading to a worried Leclerc to write in his diary: "The rainy season has arrived. My troops are exhausted with fatigue and sickness".

=== Capture of Toussaint ===
On 25 April 1802, the situation suddenly changed when Christophe defected, along with much of the Haitian Army, to the French. Louverture was promised his freedom if he agreed to integrate his remaining troops into the French army. Louverture agreed to this on 6 May 1802. Just what motivated Toussaint to give up the fight has been the subject of much debate with most probable explanation being that he was just tired after 11 years of war. Under the terms of surrender, Leclerc gave his solemn word that slavery would not be restored in Saint-Domingue, that Blacks could be officers in the French Army, and that the Haitian Army would be allowed to integrate into the French Army. Leclerc also gave Toussaint a plantation at Ennery. Toussaint was later deceived, seized by the French and shipped to France. He died months later in prison at Fort-de-Joux in the Jura Mountains. Shortly afterwards, the ferocious Dessalines rode into Le Cap to submit to France and was rewarded by being made the governor of Saint-Marc, a place that Dessalines ruled with his customary cruelty. However, the surrender of Christophe, Toussaint, and Dessalines did not mean the end of Haitian resistance. Throughout the countryside, guerrilla warfare continued and the French staged mass executions via firing squads, hanging, and drowning Haitians in bags. Rochambeau invented a new means of mass execution, which he called "fumigational-sulphurous baths": killing hundreds of Haitians in the holds of ships by burning sulphur to make sulphur dioxide to gas them.

== War of independence ==
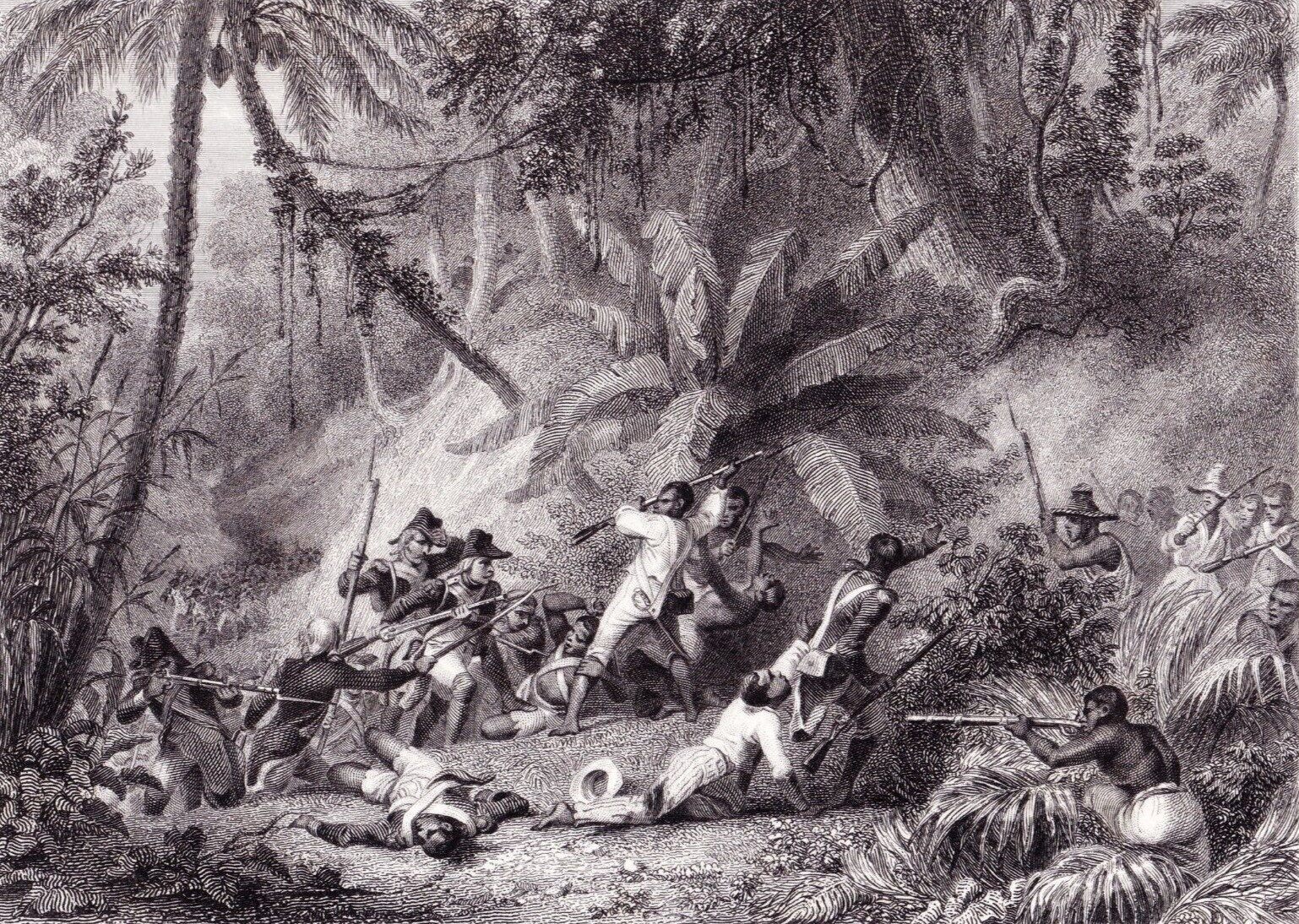
Battle at "Snake Gully" in 1802

=== Rebellion against reimposition of slavery ===
For a few months, the island was quiet under Napoleonic rule. But when it became apparent that the French intended to re-establish slavery (because they had nearly done so on Guadeloupe), Black cultivators revolted in the summer of 1802. Yellow fever had decimated the French; by the middle of July 1802, the French lost about 10,000 dead to yellow fever. By September, Leclerc wrote in his diary that he had only 8,000 fit men left as yellow fever had killed the others.

In 1802, Napoleon added a Polish legion of around 5,200 to the forces sent to Saint-Domingue to fight off the slave rebellion. However, the Poles were told that there was a revolt of prisoners in Saint-Domingue. Upon arrival and the first fights, the Polish soldiers soon discovered that what was actually taking place in the colony was a rebellion of slaves fighting off their French masters for their freedom. During this time, there was a familiar situation going on back in their homeland as these Polish soldiers were fighting for their liberty from the occupying forces of Russia, Prussia, and Austria that began in 1772. Many Poles believed that if they fought for France, Bonaparte would reward them by restoring Polish independence, which had been ended with the Third Partition of Poland in 1795. As hopeful as the Haitians, many Poles were seeking union amongst themselves to win back their freedom and independence by organizing an uprising. As a result, many Polish soldiers admired their opponents, to eventually turn on the French army and join the Haitian slaves.

Haiti's first head of state Jean-Jacques Dessalines called Polish people "the White Negroes of Europe", which was then regarded a great honor, as it meant brotherhood between Poles and Haitians. Many years later François Duvalier, the president of Haiti who was known for his Black nationalist and Pan-African views, used the same concept of "European white negroes" while referring to Polish people and glorifying their patriotism. After Haiti gained its independence, the Poles acquired Haitian citizenship for their loyalty and support in overthrowing the French colonialists, and were called "Black" by the Haitian constitution.

=== Dessalines and Pétion join Haitian forces ===
Dessalines and Pétion remained allied with France until they switched sides again, in October 1802, and fought against the French. As Leclerc lay dying of yellow fever and heard that Christophe and Dessalines had joined the rebels, he reacted by ordering all of the Blacks living in Le Cap to be killed by drowning in the harbour. In November, Leclerc died of yellow fever, like much of his army.

His successor, the Vicomte de Rochambeau, fought an even more brutal campaign. Rochambeau waged a near-genocidal campaign against the Haitians, killing everyone who was Black. Rochambeau imported about 15,000 attack dogs from Jamaica, who had been trained to savage Blacks and Mulattoes. (Other sources suggest the dogs may have been dogo cubanos sourced in their hundreds from Cuba rather than Jamaica.) At the Bay of Le Cap, Rochambeau had Blacks drowned. No one would eat fish from the bay for months afterward, as no one wished to eat the fish that had eaten human flesh. Bonaparte, hearing that most of his army in Saint-Domingue had died of yellow fever and the French held only Port-au-Prince, Le Cap, and Les Cayes, sent about 20,000 reinforcements to Rochambeau.

France's Leclerc Expedition to Haiti in 1804

Dessalines matched Rochambeau in his vicious cruelty. At Le Cap, when Rochambeau hanged 500 Blacks, Dessalines replied by killing 500 whites and sticking their heads on spikes all around Le Cap, so that the French could see what he was planning on doing to them. Rochambeau's atrocities helped rally many former French loyalists to the rebel cause. Many on both sides had come to see the war as a race war where no mercy was to be given. The Haitians burned French prisoners alive, cut them up with axes, or tied them to a board and sawed them into two.

=== War between France and Britain ===
With Napoleon's inability to send the requested massive reinforcements after the outbreak of war on 18 May 1803 with the British, the Royal Navy immediately dispatched a squadron under Sir John Duckworth from Jamaica to cruise in the region, seeking to eliminate communication between the French outposts and to capture or destroy the French warships based in the colony. The Blockade of Saint-Domingue not only cut the French forces out from reinforcements and supplies from France, but also meant that the British began to supply arms to the Haitians. Trapped, engaged in a vicious race war, and with much of his army dying of yellow fever, Rochambeau fell to pieces. He lost interest in commanding his army and as James wrote, he "amused himself with sexual pleasures, military balls, banquets and the amassing of a personal fortune".

The Royal Navy squadrons soon blockaded the French-held ports of Cap Français and Môle-Saint-Nicolas on the Northern coast of the French colony. In the summer of 1803, when war broke out between the United Kingdom and the French Consulate, Saint-Domingue had been almost completely overrun by Haitian forces under the command of Jean-Jacques Dessalines. In the north of the country, the French forces were isolated in the two large ports of Cap Français and Môle-Saint-Nicolas and a few smaller settlements, all supplied by a French naval force based primarily at Cap Français.

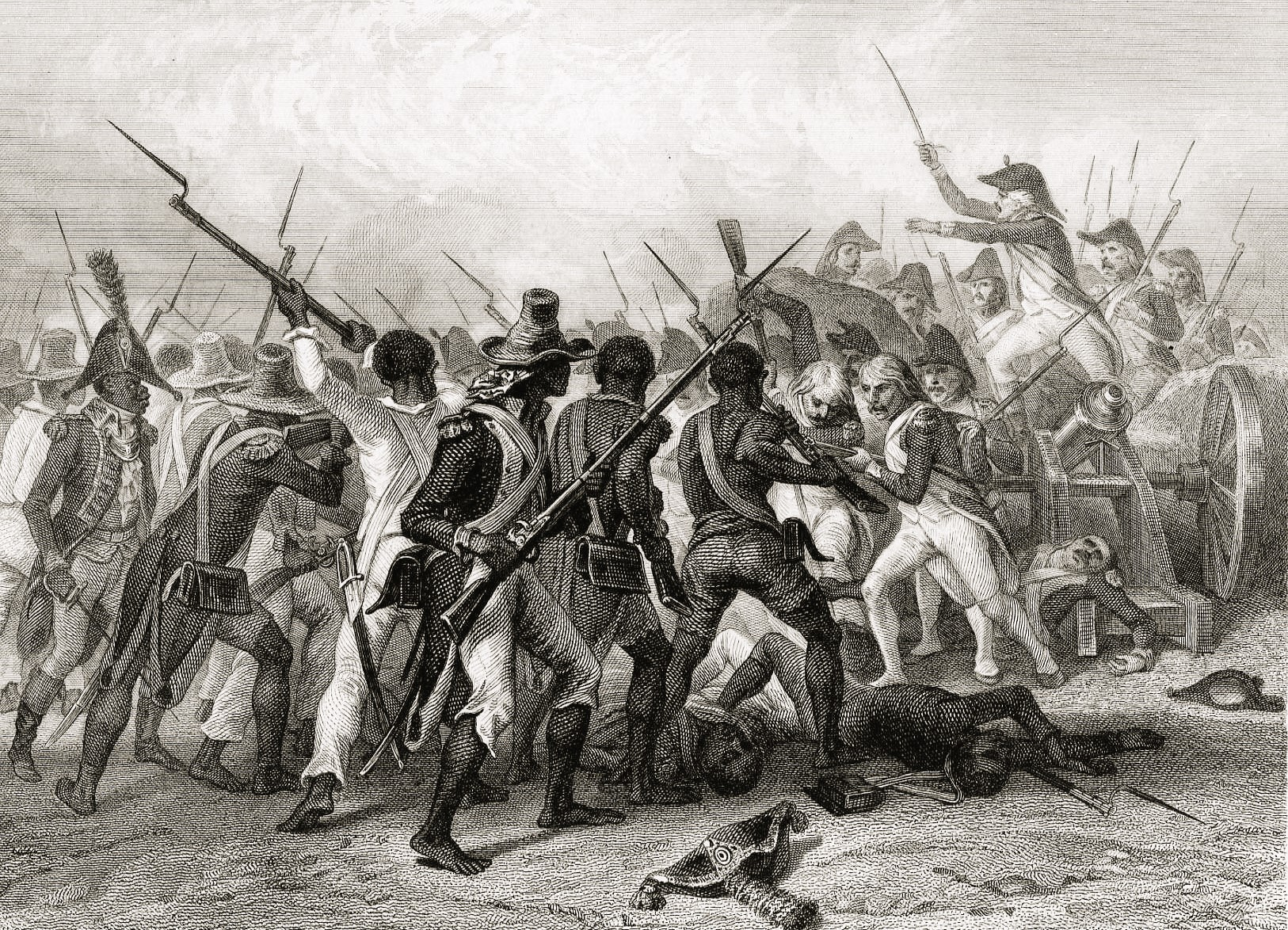
1839 illustration of the 1802 Battle of Crête-à-Pierrot

On 28 June, the squadron encountered a French convoy from Les Cayes off Môle-Saint-Nicolas, capturing one ship although the other escaped. Two days later an independently sailing French frigate was chased down and captured in the same waters. On 24 July, another British squadron intercepted the main French squadron from Cap Français, which was attempting to break past the blockade and reach France. The British, led by Commodore John Loring gave chase, but one French ship of the line and a frigate escaped. Another ship of the line was trapped against the coast and captured after coming under fire from Haitian shore batteries. The remainder of the squadron was forced to fight two more actions on their return to Europe, but did eventually reach the Spanish port of Corunna.

On 8 October 1803, the French abandoned Port-au-Prince as Rochambeau decided to concentrate what was left of his army at Le Cap. Dessalines marched into Port-au-Prince, where he was welcomed as a hero by the 100 whites who had chosen to stay behind. Dessalines thanked them all for their kindness and belief in racial equality, but then he said that the French had treated him as less than human when he was a slave, and so to avenge his mistreatment, he promptly had the 100 whites all hanged. On 3 November, the frigate HMS Blanche captured a supply schooner near Cap Français, the last hope in supplying the French forces. On 16 November 1803, Dessalines began attacking the French blockhouses outside of Le Cap. The last battle on land of the Haitian Revolution, the Battle of Vertières, occurred on 18 November 1803, near Cap-Haïtien fought between Dessalines' army and the remaining French colonial army under the Vicomte de Rochambeau; the slave rebels and freed revolutionary soldiers won the battle. By this point, Perry observed that both sides were "a little mad" as the pressures of the war and yellow fever had taken their toll, and both the French and the Haitians fought with a reckless courage, seeing death in battle as preferable to a slow death by yellow fever or being tortured to death by the enemy.

=== Haitian victory ===
Rochambeau, seeing defeat inevitable, procrastinated until the last possible moment, but eventually was forced to surrender to the British commander—by the end of the month the garrison was starving, having reached the conclusion at a council of war that surrender was the only way to escape from this "place of death". Commodore Loring, however, refused the French permission to sail and agreed terms with Dessalines that permitted them to safely evacuate provided they had left the port by 1 December. On the night of 30 November 1803, 8,000 French soldiers and hundreds of white civilians boarded the British ships to take them away. One of Rochambeau's ships was almost wrecked while leaving the harbour, but was saved by a British lieutenant acting alone, who not only rescued the 900 people on board, but also refloated the ship. At Môle-Saint-Nicolas, General Louis de Noailles refused to surrender and instead sailed to Havana, Cuba in a fleet of small vessels on 3 December, but was intercepted and mortally wounded by a Royal Navy frigate. Soon after, the few remaining French-held towns in Saint-Domingue surrendered to the Royal Navy to prevent massacres by the Haitian army. Meanwhile, Dessalines led the rebellion until its completion, when the French forces were finally defeated by the end of 1803.

On 1 January 1804, from the city of Gonaïves, Dessalines officially declared the former colony's independence, renaming it "Haiti" after the indigenous Arawak name. Although he lasted from 1804 to 1806, several changes began taking place in Haiti. The independence of Haiti was a major blow to France and its colonial empire, but the French state would take several decades to recognize the loss of the colony. As the French retreated, Haiti, which had once been called the "Pearl of the Antilles", the richest French colony in the world, was impoverished, as its economy was in ruins after the revolution. Haiti struggled to recover economically from the war. The Haitians had paid a high price for their freedom, losing about 200,000 dead between 1791 and 1803, and unlike the majority of the European dead, who were killed by yellow fever, the majority of the Haitian dead were the victims of violence.

== Casualties ==
In the early 21st century, historian Robert L. Scheina estimated that the slave rebellion resulted in the death of 350,000 Haitians and 50,000 European troops. According to the Encyclopedia of African American Politics, "Between 1791 and independence in 1804 nearly 200,000 Blacks died, as did thousands of Mulattoes and as many as 100,000 French and British soldiers." Yellow fever caused the most deaths. Geggus points out that at least 3 of every 5 British troops sent there in 1791–1797 died of disease. There has been considerable debate over whether the number of deaths caused by disease was exaggerated.

An estimated 37,000 French soldiers were killed in action during the Haitian Revolution, exceeding the total French soldiers killed in action across various 19th-century colonial campaigns in Algeria, Mexico, Indochina, Tunisia, and West Africa, which resulted in approximately 10,000 French soldiers killed in action combined. Between 1793 and 1798, the expedition to Saint-Domingue had cost the British treasury four million pounds (in 1798 money) and 100,000 men either dead, wounded, or permanently disabled from the effects of yellow fever.

== Free Black republic ==
On 1 January 1804, Dessalines, the new leader under the dictatorial 1805 constitution, declared Haiti a free republic in the name of the Haitian people, which was followed by the massacre of the remaining whites. His secretary Boisrond-Tonnerre stated, "For our declaration of independence, we should have the skin of a white man for parchment, his skull for an inkwell, his blood for ink, and a bayonet for a pen!" Haiti was the first independent nation in Latin America, the first post-colonial independent Black-led nation in the world, and the only nation whose independence was gained as part of a successful slave rebellion.

The country was damaged from years of war, its agriculture devastated, its formal commerce nonexistent. The country, therefore, had to be rebuilt. To realise this goal, Dessalines adopted the economic organisation of serfdom. He proclaimed that every citizen would belong to one of two categories, laborer or soldier. Furthermore, he proclaimed the mastery of the state over the individual and consequently ordered that all laborers would be bound to a plantation. Those that possessed skills outside of plantation work, like craftsmanship and artisans, were exempt from this ordinance. To avoid the appearance of slavery, however, Dessalines abolished the ultimate symbol of slavery, the whip. Likewise, the working day was shortened by a third. His chief motivator nonetheless was production, and to this aim he granted much freedom to the plantations' overseers. Barred from using the whip, many instead turned to lianes, which were thick vines abundant throughout the island, to persuade the laborers to keep working. Many of the workers likened the new labor system to slavery, much like Toussaint L'Ouverture's system, which caused resentment between Dessalines and his people. Workers were given a fourth of all wealth produced from their labor. Nevertheless, he succeeded in rebuilding much of the country and in raising production levels, thus slowly rebuilding the economy.

Dessalines paid large sums of money to liberate slaves on slave ships near the Haitian coast. He paid for the expenses of the returns of the thousands of Haitian refugees that left during the revolution.

Fearing a return of French forces, Dessalines first expanded and maintained a significant military force. During his reign, nearly 10% of able-bodied men were in active service resulting in a military force of up to 37,000 men. Furthermore, Dessalines ordered the construction of massive fortifications throughout the island, like the Citadelle Laferrière, the largest fortress in the Western Hemisphere. Cities and commercial centers were moved to the interior of the country, while less important ones were kept to the coast, so they could be burnt down completely to discourage the French; many commentators believe that this over-militarization contributed to many of Haiti's future problems. In fact, because young fit men were the most likely to be drafted into the army, the plantations were thus deprived of the workforce needed to function properly.

There was growing frustration between the workers, the elites, and Dessalines. A conspiracy led by the Mulatto elites ultimately led to Dessalines' assassination and two separate sovereign states of Haiti.

== 1804 massacre of the French ==
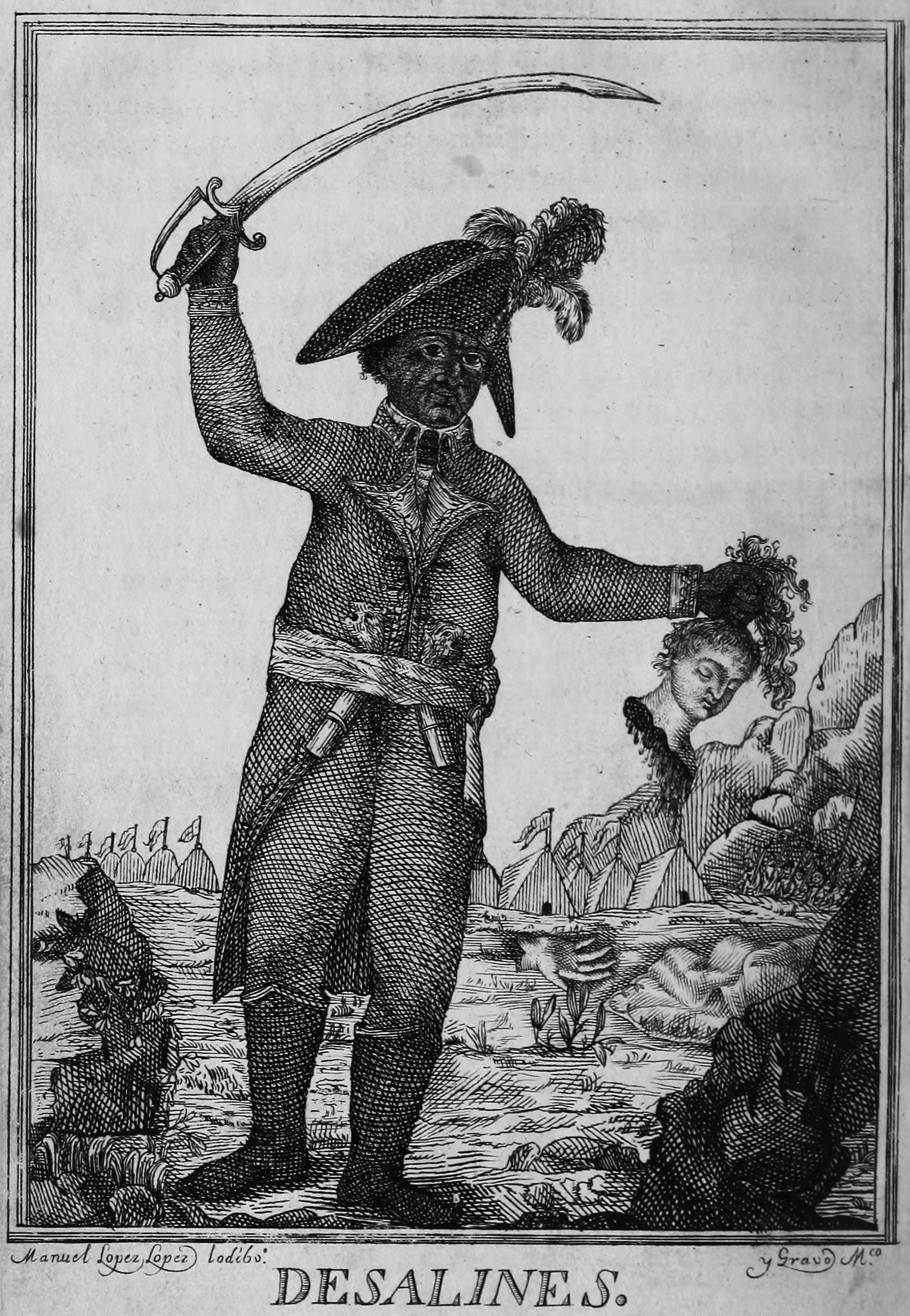
An 1806 engraving of Jean-Jacques Dessalines. It depicts the general, sword raised in one arm, while the other holds a severed head of a white woman.

The 1804 massacre was carried out against the remaining white population of French colonists and loyalists, both enemies and traitors of the revolution, by the Black population of Haiti on the order of Jean-Jacques Dessalines, who declared the French as barbarians, demanding their expulsion and vengeance for their crimes. The massacre—which took place in the entire territory of Haiti—was carried out from early February 1804 until 22 April 1804. During February and March, Dessalines traveled among the cities of Haiti to assure himself that his orders were carried out. Despite his orders, the massacres were often not carried out until he personally visited the cities.

The course of the massacre showed an almost identical pattern in every city he visited. Before his arrival, there were only a few killings, despite his orders. When Dessalines arrived, he first spoke about the atrocities committed by former French authorities, such as Rochambeau and Leclerc, after which he demanded that his orders about mass killings of the area's French population be carried out. Reportedly, he also ordered the unwilling to take part in the killings, especially men of mixed-race, so that blame would not rest solely on the Black population. Mass killings then took place on the streets and on places outside the cities. In parallel to the killings, plundering and rape also occurred. Women and children were generally killed last. White women were "often raped or pushed into forced marriages under threat of death".

By the end of April 1804, some 3,000 to 5,000 people had been killed practically eradicating the country's white population. Dessalines had specifically stated that France is "the real enemy of the new nation." This allowed certain categories of whites to be excluded from massacre who had to pledge their rejection to France: the Polish soldiers who deserted from the French army; the group of German colonists of Nord-Ouest who were inhabitants before the revolution; French widows who were allowed to keep their property; select male Frenchmen; and a group of medical doctors and professionals. Reportedly, also people with connections to Haitian notables were spared, as well as the women who agreed to marry non-white men. In the 1805 constitution that declared all its citizens as Black, it specifically mentions the naturalizations of German and Polish peoples enacted by the government, as being exempt from Article XII that prohibited whites ("non-Haitians;" foreigners) from owning land.

== Post-Revolution era ==
An independent government was created in Haiti, but the country's society remained deeply affected by patterns established under French colonial rule. As in other French colonial societies, a class of free people of color had developed after centuries of French rule here. Many planters or young unmarried men had relations with African or Afro-Caribbean women, sometimes providing for their freedom and that of their children, as well as providing for education of the mixed-race children, especially the boys. Some were sent to France for education and training, and some joined the French military. The Mulattoes who returned to Saint-Domingue became the elite of the people of color. As an educated class used to the French political system, they became the elite of Haitian society after the war's end. Many of them had used their social capital to acquire wealth, and some already owned land. Some had identified more with the French colonists than the slaves. Many of the free people of color, by contrast, were raised in French culture, had certain rights within colonial society, and generally spoke French and practiced Catholicism (with syncretic absorption of African religions.)

Following the assassination of Dessalines, another of Toussaint's Black generals, Henri Christophe, succeeded his in control of the north, while Alexandre Pétion presided over Mulatto rule in the south. There were large differences in governance between Petion's republic, and what would eventually become Christophe's kingdom. While the southern republic did not have as much focus on economic development, and put more attention on liberal land distribution and education, the northern kingdom went on to become relatively wealthy, though wealth distribution was disputed. As a result of temporary trade agreements between Christophe, the United States, and British colonies, Christophe was able to rebuild the northern region. There were large investments in education and public works, military infrastructure, and many chateaux, the most notable being the Sans Souci palace in Milot. However, much like his predecessors, this was achieved through forced labor which ultimately led to his downfall. Contrarily, Petion was beloved by his people, but despised by his northern counterpart.

A major effort by Christophe to capture Port-au-Prince in mid–1812 failed. The Mulattoes were harassed by a pocket of Black rebellion in their rear from February 1807 to May 1819 led by a Black leader named Goman in the southern mountains of the Grand-Anse, who resisted several Mulatto punitive expeditions. In 1819, the new Mulatto leader, Jean-Pierre Boyer, sent six regiments into the Grand-Anse to ferret out Goman, who was trapped and shot off a 1,000-foot cliff. In 1820, the island nation was reunified after Christophe killed himself. Boyer with 20,000 troops marched into Cap-Haïtien, the northern capital, shortly afterward to establish his power over all of Haiti. Not too long after, Boyer was able to secure cooperation with the general of the neighboring Spanish Haiti, and in February 1822 began a 22 year long unification with the eastern state, which ended in 1844 with the outbreak of the Dominican War of Independence.

=== Independence debt ===
The nascent state's future was hobbled in 1825 when France under Charles X forced it (with French warships anchored off the coast during the negotiations) to pay 150 million gold francs in reparations to French ex-slaveholders—as a condition of French political recognition and to end the newly formed state's political and economic isolation. By an order of 17 April 1825, the King of France renounced his rights of sovereignty over Santo Domingo, and recognized the independence of Haiti. President Jean-Pierre Boyer believed that the constant threat of a French invasion was stymieing the Haitian economy and thus felt the need to settle the matter once and for all.

Though the amount of the reparations was reduced to 90 million francs in 1838, Haiti was unable to finish paying off its debt until 1947. The indemnity bankrupted the Haitian treasury and left the country's government deeply impoverished, causing long-term instability. Haiti was therefore forced to take out a loan from French banks, who provided the funds for the large first installment, severely affecting Haiti's ability to prosper.

=== Influence on other abolitionist and post-colonial movements ===
While Haiti suffered major economic setbacks during the early years of the post revolutionary era, the ideals of freedom and anti-colonialism never ceased to be part of the Haitian consciousness. Citizenship was offered to any slave or oppressed person that made it to Haiti's shores as mandated by Dessaline's constitution. All four of Haiti's earlier rulers, Dessalines, Christophe, Petion, and Boyer all had programs that involved swaying African Americans to resettle there and assure their freedom. Slave boats that were captured and brought to Haiti's shores resulted in the liberation and integration of all captives on board into Haitian society. On one occasion, President Alexandre Petion protected Jamaican slaves from re-enslavement after they escaped their plantation and landed in the southern city of Jérémie. On multiple occasions, Haiti's leaders offered asylum to liberal revolutionaries globally. One of the more notable examples of this included Haiti's involvement with Gran Colombia, where Dessalines and Petion both offered aid, ammunitions, and asylum to Francisco de Miranda and Simón Bolívar, who even went as far as to credit Haiti for the liberation of his country. Dessalines offered citizenship and assistance to slaves in Martinique and Guadeloupe so that they could start their own uprisings. Mexican nationalists, Francisco Javier Mina and José Joaquín de Herrera took asylum in Les Cayes and were welcomed by Petion during Mexico's War of Independence. The Greeks later received support from President Boyer during their fight against the Ottomans.

The end of the Haitian Revolution in 1804 marked the end of French colonialism on the island. However, the social conflict cultivated under slavery continued to affect the population for years to come. Mulatto domination of politics and economics, and urban life after the revolution, created a different kind of two-caste society, as most Haitians were rural subsistence farmers. The affranchi élite, who continued to rule Haiti while the formidable Haitian army kept them in power. France continued the slavery system in French Guiana, Martinique, and Guadeloupe.

== Influence on slavery in the Americas ==
Historians continue to debate the importance of the Haitian Revolution. David Geggus asks: "How much of a difference did it make?" A limited amount, he concludes, for slavery flourished in the western hemisphere for many more decades. In the opposing camp, African American historian W. E. B. Du Bois said that the Haitian Revolution was an economic pressure without which the British parliament would not have accepted abolitionism as readily.

Other historians say the Haitian Revolution influenced slave rebellions in the U.S. as well as in British colonies. The biggest slave revolt in U.S. history was the 1811 German Coast uprising in Louisiana. This slave rebellion was put down and the punishment the slaves received was so severe that no contemporary news reports about it exist. The neighboring revolution brought the slavery question to the forefront of U.S. politics, and though inspiring to the enslaved themselves the resulting intensification of racial divides and sectional politics ended the idealism of the Revolutionary period. The American President Thomas Jefferson—who was a slaveholder himself—refused to establish diplomatic relations with Haiti (the United States did not recognize Haiti until 1862) and imposed an economic embargo on trade with Haiti that also lasted until 1862 in an attempt to ensure the economic failure of the new republic as Jefferson wanted Haiti to fail, regarding a successful slave revolt in the West Indies as a dangerous example for American slaves.

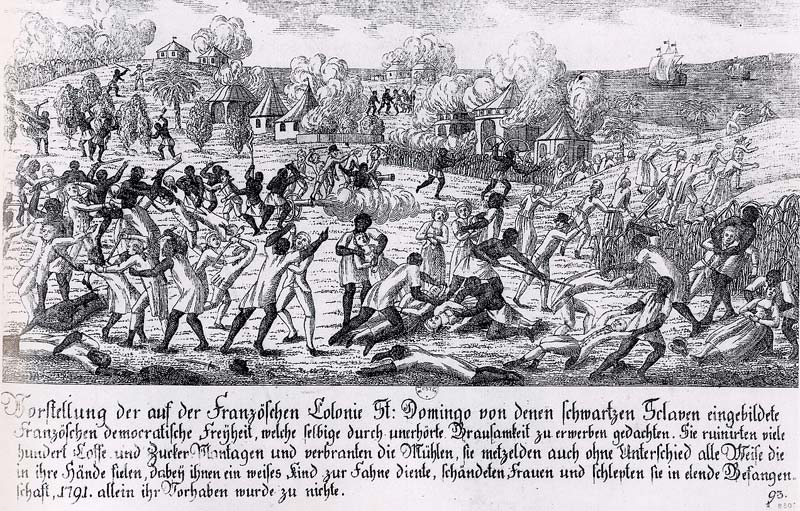
Saint-Domingue slave revolt in 1791

Beginning during the slave insurrections of 1791, white refugees from Saint-Domingue fled to the United States, particularly to Philadelphia, Baltimore, New York, and Charleston. The immigration intensified after the journée (crisis) of 20 June 1793, and soon American families began to raise money and open up their homes to help exiles in what became the United States' first refugee crisis. While some white refugees blamed the French Revolutionary government for sparking the violence in Haiti, many supported the Republican regime and openly expressed their support of the Jacobins. There is also some historical evidence suggesting that displaying solidarity with the French Revolution was the easiest way for the refugees to earn the support and sympathy of the Americans, who had just recently lived through their own revolution. American slaveholders, in particular, commiserated with the French planters who had been forcibly removed from their plantations in Saint-Domingue. While the exiles found themselves in a peaceful situation in the United States—safe from the violence raging in both France and Haiti—their presence complicated the already precarious diplomatic relations among Britain, France, and the U.S.

Many of the whites and free people of color who left Saint-Domingue for the United States settled in southern Louisiana, adding many new members to its French-speaking, mixed-race, and Black populations. The exiles causing the most alarm were the African slaves who came with their refugee owners. Some southern planters grew concerned that the presence of these slaves who had witnessed the revolution in Haiti would ignite similar revolts in the United States. Other planters, however, were confident they had the situation under control.

In 1807, Haiti was divided into two parts, the Republic of Haiti in the south, and the Kingdom of Haiti in the north. Land could not be privately owned; it reverted to the State through Biens Nationaux (national bonds), and no French whites could own land. The remaining French settlers were forced to leave the island. Those who refused were slaughtered. The Haitian State owned up to 90% of the land and the other 10% was leased in 5-year intervals.

Since the resistance and the murderous disease environment made it impossible for Napoleon to regain control over Haiti, he gave up hope of rebuilding a French New World empire. He decided to sell Louisiana to the U.S. The Haitian Revolution brought about two unintended consequences: the creation of a continental America and the virtual end of Napoleonic rule in the Americas.

There never again was such a large-scale slave rebellion. Napoleon reversed the French abolition of slavery in law, constitution, and practice, which had occurred between 1793 and 1801, and reinstated slavery in the French colonies in 1801–1803—which lasted until 1848.

== Relationship between the French and Haitian Revolutions ==
=== Reason for revolution ===
The Haitian Revolution was a revolution ignited from below, by the underrepresented majority of the population. A huge majority of the supporters of the Haitian revolution were slaves and freed Africans who were severely discriminated against by colonial society and the law.

=== Brutality ===
Despite the idealist, rational, and utopian thinking surrounding both uprisings, extreme brutality was a fundamental aspect of both uprisings. Besides initial cruelty that created the precarious conditions that bred the revolution, there was violence from both sides throughout the revolution. The period of violence during the French Revolution is known as the Reign of Terror. Waves of suspicion meant that the government rounded up and killed thousands of suspects, ranging from known aristocrats to people thought to oppose the leaders. They were killed by guillotine, "breaking at the wheel", mobs and other death machines: death toll estimates range from 18,000 to 40,000. Total casualties for the French Revolution are estimated at 2 million. In the Caribbean, total casualties totaled approximately 162,000. Violence in Haiti was largely characterized by military confrontations, riots, killing of slave owners and their families, and guerrilla warfare.

=== Lasting change ===
The Revolution in Haiti did not wait on the Revolution in France. The call for modification of society was influenced by the revolution in France, but once the hope for change found a place in the hearts of the Haitian people, there was no stopping the radical reformation that was occurring. The Enlightenment ideals and the initiation of the French Revolution were enough to inspire the Haitian Revolution, which evolved into the most successful and comprehensive slave rebellion in history. Just as the French were successful in transforming their society, so were the Haitians. On 4 April 1792, the French Legislative Assembly granted freedom to slaves in Saint-Domingue. The revolution culminated in 1804; Haiti was an independent state solely of freed peoples. The activities of the revolutions sparked change across the world. France's transformation was most influential in Europe, and Haiti's influence spanned every location that continued to practice slavery. John E. Baur honors Haiti as home of the most influential revolution in history.

== Historiographical debates ==
While acknowledging the cross-influences, most contemporary historians distinguish the Haitian Revolution from the French Revolution. Some also separate it from the earlier armed conflicts by free men of color who were seeking expansion of political rights for themselves, but not the abolition of slavery. These scholars show that if the agency of the enslaved Blacks becomes the focus of studies, the Revolution's opening and closing dates are certain. From this premise, the narrative began with the enslaved Blacks' bid for freedom through armed struggle and concluded with their victory over slavery powers and the creation of an independent state. In April 1791, a massive Black insurgency in the north of the island rose violently against the plantation system, setting a precedent of resistance to racial slavery. In cooperation with their former Mulatto rivals, Blacks ended the Revolution in November 1803 when they decidedly defeated the French Army at the Battle of Vertières. The French had already lost a high proportion of their troops to yellow fever and other diseases. After acknowledging defeat in Saint-Domingue, Napoleon withdrew from North America, agreeing to the Louisiana Purchase by the United States.

Although the series of events during these years is known under the name of "Haitian Revolution", alternative views suggest that the entire affair was an assorted number of coincidental conflicts that ended with a fragile truce between free men of color and Blacks. Historians debate whether the victorious Haitians were "intrinsically [a] revolutionary force". One thing is certain: Haiti became an independent country on 1 January 1804, when the council of generals chose Jean-Jacques Dessalines to assume the office of governor-general. One of the state's first significant documents was Dessaliness' "Liberty or Death" speech, which circulated broadly in the foreign press. In it, the new head of state made the case for the new nation's objective: the permanent abolition of slavery in Haiti.

The role of women in the Haitian Revolution was for a long time given little attention by historians, but has in recent years garnered significant attention.

== Contemporary press response ==
The revolution of African slaves brought many fears to colonies surrounding Haiti and the Caribbean. Prominent wealthy American slave owners, reading about the revolution, also read speculation about what might come in their own states. Anti-abolitionist critics of the revolution dubbed it "the horrors of Santo Domingo". However, newspapers like the Columbian Centinel took extra steps to support the revolution, comparing it to the American Revolution. The French media also played an important role in the Haitian Revolution, with contributions that made many French upstarts quite interested in the young, passionate Toussaint's writings of freedom.

There were many written discussions about the events in Haiti during the revolution in both France and England, however, they were generally written by anonymous authors. These texts also generally fell into two camps—one being proslavery authors who warned of a repetition of the violence of St. Domingue wherever abolition occurred; and the other being abolitionist authors who countered that white owners had sown the seeds of revolution.

However, all was not simple in the press. A top critic who significantly drove Toussaint into fear of backlash from France was Sonthonax, who was responsible for many outlooks of Haiti in the French newspapers. Yet Sonthonax was one of the few contenders who truly pushed for the independence of the African slaves and became a major factor in Toussaint's decision of declaring independence from France.

== In popular culture ==
- Cuban writer Alejo Carpentier's second novel, The Kingdom of This World (1949), (translated into English 1957), explores the Haitian Revolution in depth. It is one of the novels that inaugurated the Latin American renaissance in fiction beginning in the mid-20th century.
- Madison Smartt Bell wrote a trilogy called All Souls' Rising (1995) about the life of Toussaint Louverture and the slave uprising.
- C. Richard Gillespie, former Towson University professor, wrote a novelization of Louverture's life in the Revolution titled Papa Toussaint (1998).
- Though not referred to by name, Haiti is the backdrop for the 1990 Broadway musical Once on This Island by Lynn Ahrens and Stephen Flaherty. The musical, based on the novel My Love, My Love by Rosa Guy, describes the social stratification of the island, and contains a song that briefly outlines the history of the Haitian Revolution.
- In 2004, an exhibition of paintings entitled Caribbean Passion: Haiti 1804 by artist Kimathi Donkor, was held in London to celebrate the bicentenary of Haiti's revolution.
- In 2010, author Isabel Allende wrote a historical novel entitled Island Beneath the Sea, which documents the Haitian Revolution through the eyes of a slave woman living on the island.
- William Dietrich set his 2012 novel, The Emerald Storm during the Haitian Revolution.
- The television mini-series The Feast of All Saints features the Haitian Revolution in its opening scene.
- Philippe Niang directed the 2012 French two-part television film Toussaint Louverture, with Jimmy Jean-Louis playing the title role.
- The film Top Five refers to a fictional film within the film called "Uprize", ostensibly about this revolution.
- The role of Bois Caiman, Boukman, and Vodou generally, would become the subject of a controversial, discredited neo-evangelical theology in the 1990s that insisted that Haiti was pledged to the devil during the Revolution.
- Jacobin, an American socialist periodical, uses an image of Toussaint Louverture for its logo.

== Literature about the Haitian Revolution ==
- An Unbroken Agony: Haiti, From Revolution to the Kidnapping of a President
- Bug-Jargal
- The Crime of Napoleon
- The Black Jacobins

== See also ==
- Cécile Fatiman
- Charles Rivière-Hérard
- Dédée Bazile
- End of slavery in Haiti
- Faustin Soulouque
- Jean-François Papillon
- Joseph Balthazar Inginac
- Lamour Desrances
- Marie-Claire Heureuse Félicité
- Marie-Jeanne Lamartinière
- Marie-Louise Coidavid
- Marie-Madeleine Lachenais
- Pauline Bonaparte
- Peace of Basel
- Philippe Guerrier
- Pompée Valentin Vastey
- Quasi War
- Suzanne Simone Baptiste Louverture
- Sanité Bélair
- War of the South
- Women in the Haitian Revolution

== Sources ==
- Bryan, Patrick E. (1984). The Haitian Revolution and Its Effects. Heinemann. ISBN 978-0-435-98301-7.
- Dubois, Laurent (2005). Avengers of the New World. Harvard University Press. ISBN 978-0-674-01826-6.
- Girard, Philippe R. (2011). The Slaves Who Defeated Napoleon: Toussaint Louverture and the Haitian War of Independence, 1801–1804. Tuscaloosa: University of Alabama Press. ISBN 978-0-8173-1732-4.
- James, Cyril Lionel Robert (1989). The Black Jacobins: Toussaint Louverture and the San Domingo Revolution (2nd ed.). Vintage. ISBN 978-0-679-72467-4.
- Leyburn, James (1961). The Haitian People. Yale University Press.
- Perry, James (2005). Arrogant Armies: Great Military Disasters and the Generals Behind Them. Edison: CastleBooks.
- Censer, Jack R.; Hunt, Lynn (2001). Liberty, Equality, Fraternity Exploring the French Revolution. Penn State University Press. ISBN 978-0-271-02088-4.
