= Romaine-la-Prophétesse =

Haitian plantation owner and revolutionary leader

Romaine-la-Prophétesse (French: [ʁɔmɛn la prɔfetɛs], "Romaine the Prophetess" ), born Romaine Rivière (Note: A few references instead spell the birth name Romain Rivière, and as Romaine was born on the Spanish side of Hispaniola, biographer Terry Rey suggests the French records may be giving the name (and those of Romaine's parents, given as Jean Rivière and Gabrielle Joseph) in gallicized form in either case: Romaine might have been born Román Rivera to parents Juan Rivera and Gabriela Jose, though it is also possible the family was originally from the French part of the island and only moved to the Spanish side prior to Romaine's birth and the French spellings are original. Romaine's chosen name is sometimes given without hyphens as Romaine la Prophétesse, or (in English reference works) in translation as Romaine the Prophetess, feminine forms sic.) around 1750 in Santo Domingo, was a free black coffee plantation owner and leader of an uprising early in the Haitian Revolution.

In 1791, in response to rising racial tensions in Saint-Domingue and to an armed group gathered at a nearby plantation, Romaine and followers burned that plantation and others throughout southern Haiti, freeing thousands of enslaved people.

Romaine identified as a prophetess and dressed as a woman once the uprising began, and may have been transgender or genderfluid.

Romaine briefly governed the two main cities in southern Haiti, Léogâne and Jacmel. In 1792, support for violent revolution waned among wealthier free blacks, while formerly-enslaved blacks deserted due to (or disregarded) the peace treaties Romaine had signed to gain control of Léogâne and Jacmel. White colonists, reinforced by France, pushed Romaine's forces back to their base at Trou Coffy and destroyed it, capturing Romaine's wife and daughter. Romaine escaped and continued to preach.

== Life before 1791 ==
Romaine Rivière was born around 1750 in Santo Domingo, the Spanish-controlled part of Hispaniola, as a free black person. (Note: A few records instead describe Romaine as a griffe, only three-quarters black.) Their parents' names are given in French records as Jean Rivière and Gabrielle Joseph. Notarial and parochial records describe Romaine as illiterate, or at least unable to make a signature, but Haitian historian Jean Fouchard offers evidence that Romaine was or became otherwise well-educated.

By 1772, Romaine had migrated to the French-colonized side of the island, to the West Province of Saint-Domingue, and there acquired a small coffee plantation named Trou Coffy (Note: Other spellings found in records and reference works include Trou-Coffi, Trou Coffey, and in older literature Trou-Coffé.) in a deep, narrow, crater-like valley in the mountains near Léogâne, likely in what is now Fondwa. Various notarial records show Romaine buying and selling land and slaves in the area around Léogâne and Grande Marre in the 1780s, and establish that they had become "a respectable coffee grower and trader" by that time.

Romaine met Marie Roze Adam, an enslaved creole (mulatta) woman, on the plantation of Rene Guindet, as Romaine repeatedly visited this plantation, possibly as a trading partner or employee. Between 1772 and 1777, Adam bore them three children. Romaine spent twelve years working to liberate Adam and their children from slavery, ultimately buying them from Guindet for 6,000 livres on August 10, 1785. Twelve days later, on August 22, Romaine married Adam, taking advantage of a clause in the Code Noir that freed slaves who married their owners; at the time, Adam was 43 years old, and of their three children, Louis-Marie was 11, Pierre-Marie was 9, and Marie-Jeanne was 7. At the time of the wedding, Romaine owned 40 carreaux of land (approximately 127 acres) and at least two slaves. Adam had at least one other daughter, Marie Louise, who was baptized a free woman in 1763 (at which time Adam had also been recorded as free), and who married a free black man in 1787, with Romaine listed as her stepfather.

Romaine came to be respected in the area, especially in the free black community, and between 1785 and 1791 became a godparent to nine people, while Adam became a godmother to four, connecting the couple to numerous other families. Romaine also served as a witness to at least one marriage, and was friends with three successive curates of the parish of Léogâne. These connections and alliances allowed Romaine to later quickly gather a number of supporters when inter-racial tensions in the colony rose to the point of open conflict in 1791.

== 1791-1792 uprising ==
- Areas affected by the Trou Coffy insurgency: Léogâne — pink Fondwa (Trou Coffy) — blue Bainet — orange Jacmel — green Marigot — red

In 1791, as tensions between white and black Haitians turned into the Haitian Revolution, Joseph-Marie Tavet, one of the region's richest and most powerful residents, gathered about a hundred armed men at his plantation near Romaine-la-Prophétesse's. Fearing "the mistreatment that the whites of the colony never ceased to mete out against the people of color" and feeling obliged to protect them, Romaine called on friends and community connections including free blacks and some poor whites (petits blancs) to gather with arms at Trou Coffy, significantly outnumbering Tavet's group.

Over several days beginning on or around September 24, 1791, Romaine's forces attacked Tavet's plantation, injuring several people, and eventually burning the plantation to the ground. After this, Romaine's supporters increased significantly, numbering in the thousands, including women as well as men, in a general uprising against slavery. Over the course of the uprising, these forces took weapons and supplies from and burned plantations everywhere from Bainet, about 45 kilometers west of Jacmel, to Marigot (where free black insurgents built a fort), about 25 kilometers east of it. They injured or killed slave-owners and symbolically cut their whips, and told enslaved people that the king had freed them.

Soon after raids around Jacmel began, Tavet (who had become the mayor of that city) sent a delegation of forty men and several brigades of armed, mounted police (the maréchaussée) toward Trou Coffy to negotiate a peace treaty, though the group seems to have decided to try to attack Trou Coffy instead, and sent a request for assistance to Léogâne. In late 1791, with at least ten thousand (and by some estimates as many as thirteen thousand) followers, largely former slaves, Romaine besieged Jacmel and Léogâne. Romaine's closest confidante throughout this insurgency was a son-in-law, Soliment, (Note: Also spelled Solimant or Soliman.) who had married Marie-Jeanne when she was 14 or 15, while Romaine's second-in-command was Elie Courlogne. Third or fourth in command, and directly in charge of Romaine's fight for Jacmel, was a poor white man named Delisle de Bresolle.

Many of the area's free blacks initially allied with the charismatic Romaine, and with their support, the Trou Coffy insurgents pressed the inhabitants of Léogâne until they could no longer sustain even minimal resistance and sued for peace. Wealthier free blacks, feeling that their credibility in the eyes of whites and station in planter society were threatened by the slave uprising's revolutionary nature and increasing violence, also came to desire an end to the uprising, and asked the white French Catholic priest and doctor Félix Pascalis Ouvière (Abbé Ouvière) to go to Trou Coffy and negotiate a peace treaty.

In late December 1791, Ouvière—who had exchanged letters with Romaine for months—negotiated a peace treaty between Trou Coffy and Léogâne giving Romaine control of the government of that city. The treaty was "unprecedented not only in Saint-Domingue but also in the entire revolutionary Atlantic world" in putting a black leader in charge of one of a European colony's most important cities. The white royalist de Villards, who had been named to his post in November in a compromise between local whites and the free black confederacy, remained as mayor, but was subordinate to Romaine. Romaine's forces soon also occupied Jacmel, having by then burned large parts of it. (Later, before ceding control of it, they would set fire to Léogâne as well.)

Romaine now controlled a large swath of West Province, but this power, and their control of the Trou Coffy insurgency, was breaking down. During a Mass on New Year's Day in St. Rose de Lima (the oldest church in Haiti) held to solemnize the peace treaty between Trou Coffy and Léogâne, insurgents no longer acting under Romaine's control disrupted the homily. Furthermore, after leaving Trou Coffy, Ouvière provided a detailed description of the camp to Romaine's enemies in the colonial government. These enemies were in turn being reinforced: French national commissioner Edmond de Saint-Léger was making his way to Port-au-Prince and mustering troops with which to retake Léogâne even as Romaine's own forces deserted. Seeking an alliance with the forces of André Rigaud, whose free black soldiers esteemed the Trou Coffy insurgents, Romaine directed Léogâne to send food, clothes, and munitions to Rigaud's camp at Bizoton near Port-au-Prince. The violent excesses committed by Romaine's troops, however, made Rigaud unwilling to ally with them.

The Trou Coffy uprising freed many slaves, and resulted in pressure on plantation owners to make concessions to those slaves who did not revolt, who were given more days a week off from work, but it had come to be opposed by a coalition of whites and conservative free blacks, which was reinforced by Saint-Léger's soldiers. On March 12, 1792, Romaine staged a final raid on Léogâne and initially captured its cannons, before being repulsed by fire from Saint-Léger's cannons, muskets, and frigate La Galathée. On March 25, Saint-Léger decisively raided Trou Coffy with a battalion of 400 men led by Boyer and Singlar, destroying the site and capturing Romaine's wife and daughter, although Romaine themself escaped. A letter dated April 12, 1792, published in the Mercure de France and likely written by Ouvière, states that Romaine not only avoided capture but "continues to preach". Nothing further is known of Romaine after 1792.

== Religious, ethnic, and gender identity and interpretations ==
Romaine-la-Prophétesse's religion, ethnic or national origin, and gender identity have been the subject of scholarly discussion and uncertainty. Biographer Terry Rey writes that Romaine was most likely Catholic as well as a figure in the nascence of Haitian Vodou. Rey says that although some critics alleged "that the prophetess opportunistically feigned and exploited religious faith to fan the fires of violent fanaticism", the fact that all three of Romaine's children were named for the Virgin Mary suggests Romaine had been deeply Marian since long before the insurgency, during which Ouvière "exploit[ed] the prophetess' ardent Catholic piety" to gain Romaine's trust. Shortly after the insurgency began, Romaine professed to be a godchild of the Virgin Mary, and produced written messages supposedly from her calling for the overthrow of slavery. Romaine said Mass with a saber in hand, and preached that God was black.

A few contemporary and later accounts say that, like many Haitians, Romaine blended Catholicism with African folk practices and beliefs, and is seen by some writers as a Vodou priest. Carolyn Fick argues that "not one reference to this leader can be found that even vaguely suggests genuine African voodoo practices", but Rey counters that Romaine's use of herbal remedies and other things are suggestive of vodou. Colin Palmer says identifying Romaine outright as a vodou priest is anachronistic, as Romaine was active at a time when Vodou was only just beginning to emerge as a religion, while Rey says that although Romaine's religious practices differed from Makandal, Dutty Boukman and others, "it would be fallacious to conclude therefore that he was not practicing Vodou—or, perhaps, that any of these figures were practicing Vodou", since at the time Vodou was not a distinct, uniform religion. Trou Coffy insurgents viewed their leader as a healer (who employed herbal remedies) and a prophetic figure in the mold of generations of Kongolese prophets. Though Romaine was not born in the Kongo, many followers were, and Romaine's Marianism and religious practices were typical of the Kongolese.

Romaine prominently identified as a prophétesse (prophetess) rather than a prophète (male prophet), and Rey connects Romaine to the transgender feminized religious figures of West Central Africa. The religious leader spoke of being possessed by a female spirit, something comparable to vodou beliefs according to which a person can be possessed by divinities of another gender. Romaine "transgressed conventional gender norms", being visibly feminine in demeanor and appearance, wearing ribbons and rosaries and dressing like a woman. At the same time as identifying as a prophetess, the insurgent leader also identified as either a godson or godchild of the Virgin Mary, (Note: Whether Rivière personally used the gendered term "godson" is unclear. In addition, a few references instead say "grandson".) and Fick says one critic "claimed that his real intention [...] was to become king of Saint Domingue." Romaine may have been transgender (though Rey argues applying that term could be anachronistic) or genderfluid. Mary Grace Albanese and Hourya Bentouhami count Romaine-la-Prophétesse among the women who led the Haitian Revolution.

Romaine has been compared to Dona Beatriz Kimpa Vita, who professed to be the incarnation of a male Catholic saint, as both of their religious self-identifications "transcended gender".

In January 1792, during Romaine's occupation of the city, the mayor of Léogâne referred to the insurgent leader as "hermaphroditic". Ouvière said Rivière wore a turban (other islanders wore headwraps) and appeared like "a prophet of the Roman religion [in] the clothing of a Turk", and later denounced the insurgent leader as "the Muhammad of Saint Domingue". Other contemporary French accounts were also hostile and regarded the insurgent leader as a "villain", "charlatan", "maniac", or "adventurer".

== In popular culture ==
Romaine-la-Prophétesse appears in Victor Hugo's novel Bug-Jargal, and plays a role in Mayra Montero's In the Palm of Darkness as a woman leading a pack of zombies.
