= Bug-Jargal =

1826 novel by Victor Hugo

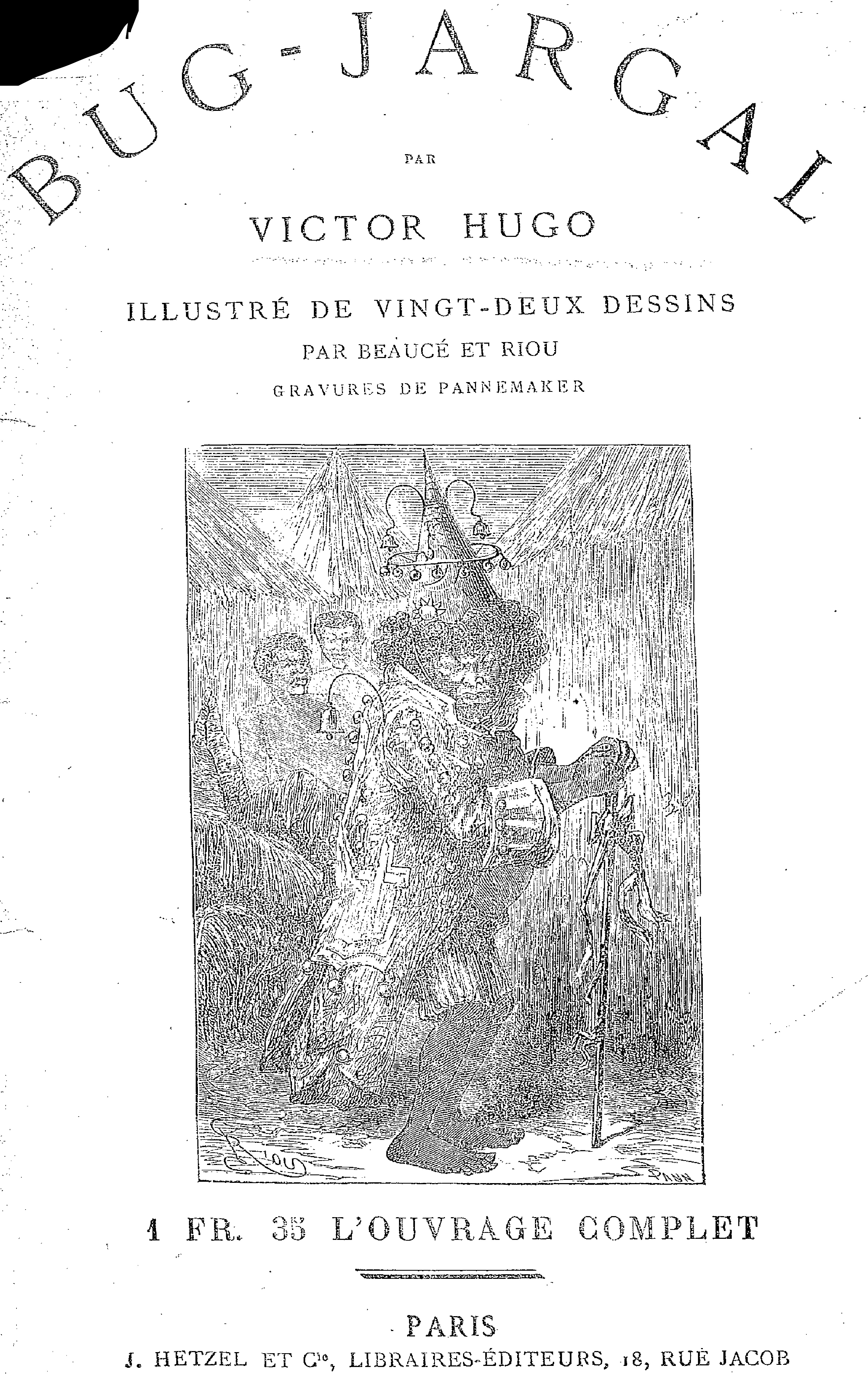
- Author: Victor Hugo
- Language: French, Spanish (minor)
- Publisher: J. Hetzel
- Publication date: 1826
- Publication place: France
- English publication date: 1833
- Media type: Print
- Pages: 211

Bug-Jargal is a novel by the French writer Victor Hugo. First published in 1826, it is a reworked version of an earlier short story of the same name published in the Hugo brothers' magazine Le Conservateur littéraire in 1820. The novel follows a friendship between the enslaved African prince of the title and a French military officer named Leopold D'Auverney during the tumultuous early years of the Haitian Revolution.

Hugo later claimed that the story was to have been part of a collaborative work called Contes sous la Tente (Tales under a Tent), and that he had written it in 1818 (at the age of sixteen) in two weeks; the manuscript is however dated April 1819.

Several translations into English exist. The first, a modified version with the title The Slave-King, was published in 1833. The only modern translation is by Chris Bongie and was published in 2004.

== Plot ==
The story of Bug-Jargal begins several weeks before the Haitian Revolution, when Toussaint Louverture fights the colonial regime. D'Auverney, the nephew of a landed aristocrat with many slaves, is betrothed to Marie, his cousin. A slave, Pierrot, falls in love with Marie, but can not do anything because of the obvious racial and cultural barriers between them. However, Pierrot does save Marie from a crocodile, but soon finds himself thrown in prison for trying to protect another slave from his owner's wrath. D'Auverney befriends him, and not long before the Haitian Revolution, Pierrot warns the lovers to flee the island. They stay despite the warning, and the day of the wedding the slave revolution begins, and the white landowners see the rapid and violent dissolution of their society. Pierrot saves Marie from a slave attack and whisks her away, but D'Auverney, thinking that Pierrot had kidnapped his new wife for his own desires, wanders into a dark grotto. He is taken prisoner by the infamously violent slave leader Biassou. In the grotto the freed slaves force their captured white prisoners to kill each other in order to preserve their own skins. Pierrot luckily comes to the rescue of D'Auverney, who learns that Pierrot is really Bug-Jargal, the mystical leader of the slaves. Pierrot leads him to his wife, and dies protecting his friends.
