= Battle of Crête-à-Pierrot =

1802 battle of the Saint-Domingue expedition

Coordinates: 19.1167°N 72.4500°W

- Part of the Saint-Domingue expedition
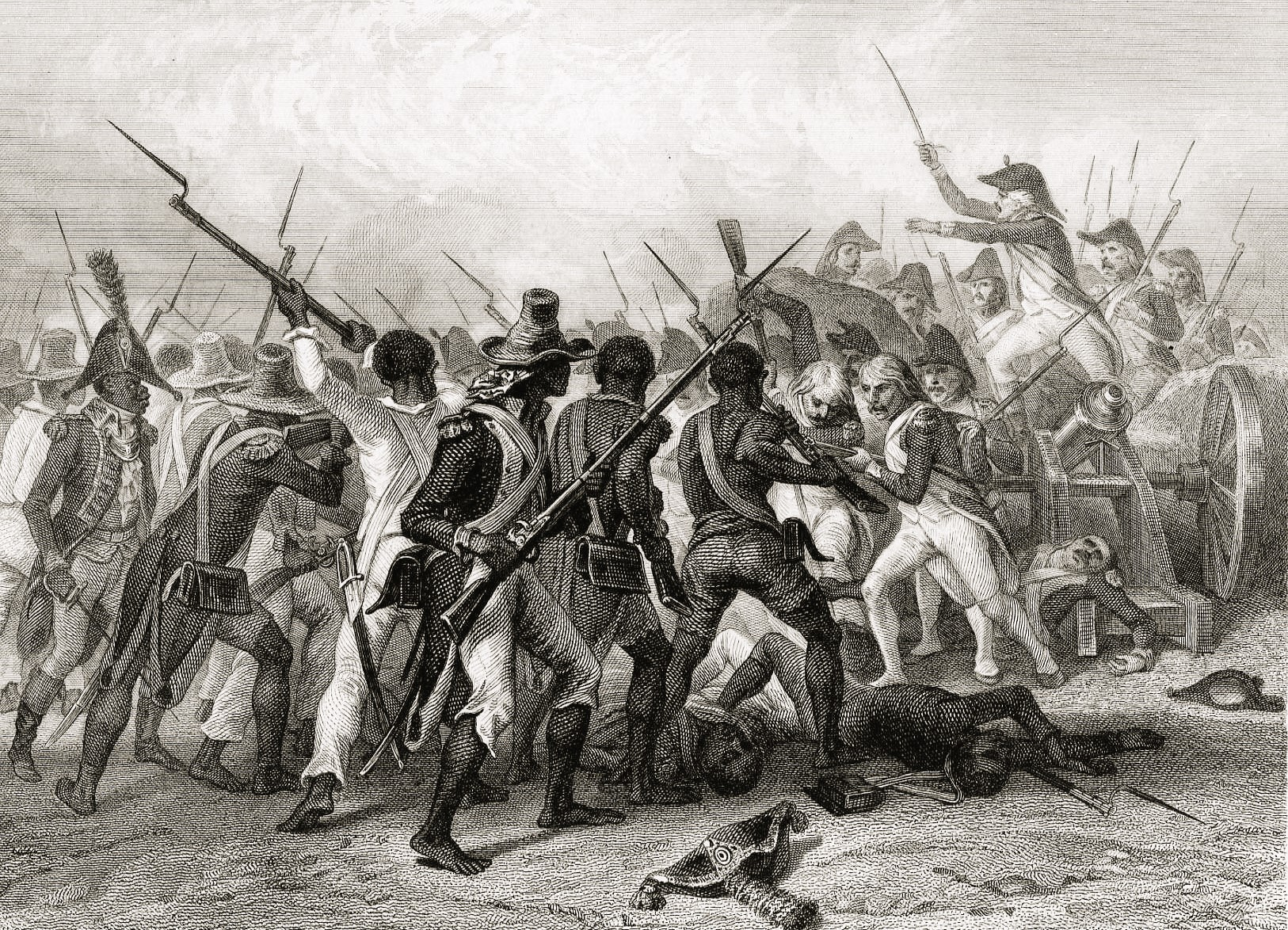
- 1839 illustration of the battle by Auguste Raffet
Date	2–24 March 1802
Location	Near Saint-Marc, Saint-Domingue
Result	French victory

Belligerents
France	Saint-Domingue

Commanders and leaders
Charles Leclerc	Jean-Jacques Dessalines

Strength
15,000	1,200

Casualties and losses
1,500–2,000 killed or wounded	500–600 killed or wounded 600 captured

The Battle of Crête-à-Pierrot was a major battle of the Saint-Domingue expedition that took place between 2 March and 24 March 1802 as part of the expedition's efforts to retake the colony of Saint-Domingue from Toussaint Louverture's control.

The battle took place at the Crête-à-Pierrot fort ("Little Peter's Crest;" in Haitian Creole Lakrèt-a-Pyewo), east of Saint-Marc on the valley of the Artibonite River. A French army of 2,000 men under Divisional-General Charles Leclerc blockaded the fort, which was defended by Black troops of Louverture's army under General Jean-Jacques Dessalines. The fort was strategically important as it controlled access to the Cahos Mountains. With their food and munitions supplies depleted, Dessalines's troops escaped the French blockade and escaped to the mountains. There, they killed numerous white colonists before regaining control of the Crête-à-Pierrot fort on 11 March.

On 12 March, the French attempted to capture the fort, but failed; General Jean Boudet's forces suffered 480 casualties, and Dessalines's forces suffered losses of 200-300. Another attempt on 22 March led to 300 French killed. On 24 March, Dessalines's forces abandoned the fort in the night due to their heavy losses and the French gained control. Donatien de Rochambeau ordered 600 wounded prisoners captured by the French to be summarily executed. The French had suffered heavy losses, including the death of General Charles Dugua. French General Alexandre Pétion played an important role in the battle by deploying his cannon on a hill overlooking the fort.

Following the battle, Dessalines deserted Louverture and swore allegiance to France, joining his forces with Leclerc's. Further defections of Louverture's commanders led him to surrender in May. Though a defeat for Louverture's army, the battle demonstrated their fighting qualities and showed that they could cause significant casualties to the French army. After yellow fever disabled much of Leclerc's army, Dessalines, correctly fearing that the French planned to restore slavery, revolted in October along with Pétion. The story of the stubborn resistance displayed by Dessalines' troops at the battle gave Louverture's army confidence.
