= Charles Bélair =

Haitian revolutionary (1778–1802)

- Born: 1778
- Died: 15 October 1802 (aged 23–24)
- Spouse: Sanite Belair
- Relatives: Toussaint Louverture
- Military career
- Allegiance: Spain; France; Haiti
- Branch: Spanish Royal Army; French Revolutionary Army; Indigenous Army
- Service years: 1791–1802
- Rank: Brigadier general
- Conflicts: Haitian Revolution

Charles Bélair (1778 – 15 October 1802) was an aide-de-camp and close lieutenant of Toussaint Louverture during the Haitian Revolution. Bélair began his military career in the service of Spanish royalists under the command of Georges Biassou, later defecting to the French and eventually reaching the rank of Brigadier general and serving as Commandant of l'Arcahaie in the Haitian Revolutionary Army. He was also a nephew of Toussaint Louverture. In 1796, he married Sanite Belair.

== Haitian Revolution ==
Bélair first enters the historical record on December 25, 1791, a few months after the events of August 22, when, along with his commander Biassou, he signed a letter of high political significance addressed to the abee de Lahaye. In the summer of 1794, he abandoned Biassou and the Spanish and followed Toussaint into the service of France. With the organization of the troops into demi-brigades in the spring of 1795, he was integrated into a battalion of the 7th Demi-Brigade, eventually becoming its leader, replacing Desrouleaux. During the War of the South, which he waged without excess of zeal, he remained in this post until the campaign in the East. Promoted to brigadier general in January 1801, he retained command of the port of Arcahaie. With the landing of General Leclerc's expeditionary forces, Bélair remained loyal to Louverture and took a defensive posture. As General Boudet's troops approached Arcahaie in February 1802, Bélair collected the funds from the public treasury as well part of the population, set fire to the city and withdrew to the neighboring mountains of Les Matheux. After the fall of Crête-à-Pierrot at the end of March, Bélair fell back into the interior of the country to the mountains around Cahos. This put Belair in a defensive position immediately adjacent to the Cordon de l'Ouest, Louverture's original stronghold centered around Ennnery. At the time of his submission, on May 6, Toussaint Louverture obtained from Captain General Leclerc pardon for three of his generals: Dessalines, Vernet and Bélair. On May 26, Bélair, now under the command of Lerclerc, was transferred from his post as commander of Arcahaie to Verrettes, where he settled on one of his properties.

== Capture and execution ==
The news of the arrest and deportation of Toussaint on June 11 moved Bélair into rebellion. On August 22, 1802 he went to Arcahaie and raised the banner of revolt, later occupying the heights of the Artibonites with his command of troops who had just so recently laid down their arms and passed into French service. Leclerc sent Dessalines (whom Bélair had accused of betraying his benefactor, Louverture) against him. To force Bélair to surrender, disloyal means were used and his family was imprisoned. After learning of the arrest of his wife and mother, Bélair left his hiding place; he was arrested and delivered to Leclerc. The latter formed a commission to judge him, made up of General Charles Dugua, as president, and brigadier generals Clerveaux and Duverseau. Bélair was found guilty and condemned and, on October 15, 1802, he died by firing squad, followed immediately by his wife Sanité.

== Legacy ==
The high school in Arcahaie, which until then had been named François Duvalier, became the Charles Bélair high school in 1986.
