= Paul Louverture =

Paul Louverture (born 1761-died 1803) was a Haitian military officer.

== Biography ==
The son of Hippolyte and Pauline Arada, he was the younger brother of Toussaint Louverture. He married Demoiselle Polcano, whom he had a daughter named Pauline and a son named Célestin; he also had two illegitimate sons named Louis and Raymond. His wife and children were executed in 1802.

In 1792, he joined his brother's army alongside Moyse Louverture and Jean-Jacques Dessalines, serving as part of the general staff. Around 1800, he was promoted to brigadier general and participated in the campaign against Santo Domingo, eventually becoming the governor of Engano. With his military rank, he governed Santo Domingo and was tasked with defending eastern Hispaniola from the French. On 6 February 1802, Brigadier General Antoine-Nicolas Kerverseau arrived in Santo Domingo with 400 French soldiers and two frigates, while Louverture had 1,600 men. On 21 February, he surrendered to the French expedition along with Major General Augustin Clerveaux, governor of Samana. Months later, Louverture joined the general revolt.

Major General Henri Christophe did the same, leading for months the French attacks against the "Congos", a term used for slaves born in Africa, under the command of Jean-Baptiste Sans-Souci. When Christophe joined the revolt, the "Congos" refused to recognize his authority and recognized only Jean-Jacques Dessalines. Seeing his authority undermined in northern Saint-Domingue, Christophe invited Sans-Souci to a meeting and used the opportunity to assassinate him. The enraged "Congos" responded by attacking Christophe, who was forced to retreat. Led by Petit-Noël Prière, they marched on Dondon, where Louverture was commander. His house was surrounded by the rebels, and he was eventually captured.

In early 1803, the Congos executed Louverture. Dessalines attacked them and forced them to retreat to the mountains shortly afterwards. Petit-Noël did not reappear until the French evacuated Cap-Haïtien, at which point Dessalines captured and shot him. The survivors retreated to the mountains from where they continued to harass the indigenous army.
