= Indigenous Army =

1791–1806 Haitian abolitionist rebels

- Flag of the Indigenous Army (1803–1804)
- Active: 1803–1804
- Country: Haiti
- Allegiance: Saint-Domingue (1791–1803); Haiti (1804–1915)
- Type: Land forces
- Size: Approximately 160,000 (including volunteers)
- Motto: Liberté ou la Mort
- Colors: Le Bicolore
- March: Grenadiers a l'assaut!
- Engagements: Saint-Domingue expedition Battle of Ravine-à-Couleuvres; Battle of Crête-à-Pierrot; 2nd Siege of Port-au-Prince (1803); Blockade of Saint-Domingue; Action of 28 June 1803 (Môle-Saint-Nicolas); Battle of Vertières

Commanders
- Commander-in-chief: Toussaint Louverture (1791–1802); Jean-Jacques Dessalines (1803–06)
- Notable commanders: Alexandre Pétion; Henri Christophe; François Capois; Étienne Élie Gerin; Magloire Ambroise; Jacques Maurepas; Sanité Belair; Augustin Clerveaux

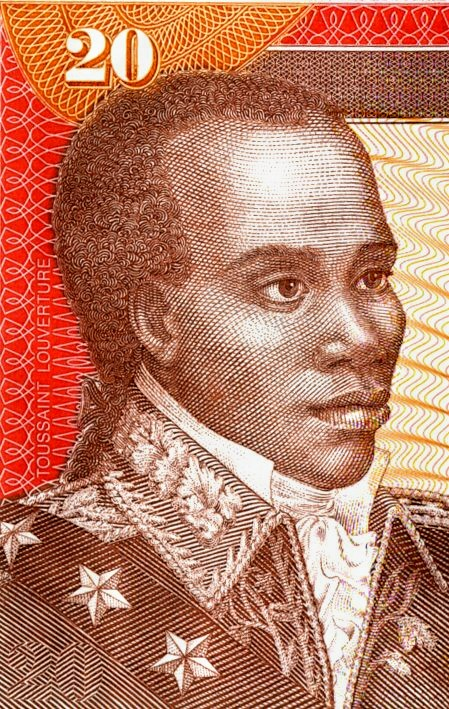
Toussaint Louverture, general of the Armée Indigène

The Indigenous Army (French: Armée Indigène; Haitian Creole: Lame Endijèn), also known as the Army of Saint-Domingue (French: Armée de Saint-Domingue) was the name bestowed to the coalition armies of anti-slavery men and women who fought in the Haitian Revolution in Saint-Domingue (now Haiti). Encompassing both black slaves, and affranchis (black and mulatto freedmen alike), the rebels were not officially titled the Armée indigène until January 1803, under the leadership of then-general Jean-Jacques Dessalines. Predated by insurrectionists such as François Mackandal, Vincent Ogé and Dutty Boukman, Toussaint Louverture, succeeded by Dessalines, led, organized, and consolidated the rebellion. The now full-fledged fighting force utilized its manpower advantage and strategic capacity to overwhelm French troops, ensuring the Haitian Revolution was the most successful of its kind.

== Etymology ==
Dessalines utilized that term to separate themselves from the French philosophy and slave-based economy and to galvanize the affranchi, bossale, and creoles around one common goal, the independence of Hayti. A precedent to the term indigène was Dessalines' first army known as Armée des Incas referring to the Inca Empire in South America. The finality of the term happened on January 1, 1804, when Dessalines restore the native name of the Island from St-Domingue to Hayti and later on in the speech he declared by chasing out the French troops he then avenges the Americas.

== History ==
=== Pre-Haitian Revolution and context ===
In the late 18th century and early 19th century, the French colony of Saint-Domingue, later established as Haiti post-revolution, was founded on the western half of the island of Hispaniola in the Caribbean. An agriculturally potent landmass, France regarded the colony as a highly valuable asset and the shining star of its imperial crown, producing most of the world's sugar and coffee by the 1780s. A forced labor plantation economy, historians note that the chattel slavery established within the colony was brutal, with torture being commonplace. Disease, such as yellow fever, was epidemically prevalent, contributing to the high slave mortality rate. In efforts to save money, some plantation owners hastened the death of sickly slaves through intentional starvation, aware that replacements would be shipped to the colony. Enforced by the Code Noir, these cruel living conditions led the slaves to conspire to revolt, eventually forming the Armée Indigène. Enveloped in inhumane treatment, many slaves found solace in Vodou, though always in a conciliatory fashion, as the practice was explicitly banned by plantation owners.

Despite their free status, the gens de couleur were unprotected from discrimination. Petits blancs (poor whites) resented the gens de couleur because of their wealth and power, gained by the ability to buy other slaves. In 1789, The Declaration of the Rights of Man and of the Citizen gave hope to the gens de couleur that France would look at every citizen equally, regardless of position or race, giving them better living conditions and rights. However, the vague interpretation of the Declaration would leave the gens de couleur's social position unchanged. In fact, the grand blancs would take advantage of the Declaration and use it to gain independence from trade regulations. In addition, slavery was not officially abolished. Since the 1780s, free men of color such as Julien Raimond and Vincent Oge had tried to get free people of color the rights that belonged to them by representing the colonies in the National Assembly. One of these rights was the right to vote; however, free people of color were still denied of this right.

With 300 armed gens de couleur and affranchis, Vincent Oge led an insurrection, which attempted to disarm the white men of Grande-Rivière. Taking place on 29 October 1790, this event became known as the Oge Rebellion, and ended in failure. Oge and his rebels were executed on the wheel, and his barbaric death would cause even more tension amongst the free people of color and eventually the enslaved, who already had the mindset of revolution.

=== Haitian Revolution ===
By the end of the 18th century, a century after the Treaty of Ryswick, the social tension in St-Domingue had reached a feverish pitch.

- Plaine-du-Nord, in the Grand-Nord region, Dutty Boukman, and Cecile Fatiman commanded thousand of rebel slave to ravage the crops;
- Plaine du-Cul-de-Sac, in the West region, Sanglaou;
- Plaine de Léoganes and Jacmel, in West region, Romaine-la-Prophétesse
- Plaine des Cayes, in the Tiburon Peninsula region, the Macaya-Marrons attacked the city of Les Cayes for closed to a year.
- Massif the Baoruco (Massif de la Selle and Sierra the Baoruco), Lamour Dérance, a black slave to both Toussaint Louverture and Jean-Jacques Dessalines.

In 1803 the leaders Sansousi and Lamour Dérance and troops were formally incorporated in the Armée Indigène.

The first mass rebellion broke out in August 1791, when religious Vodoun priest ougan-sanba Dutty Boukman ordered the slaves to attack Bois Caïman.In a couple of weeks, the number of slaves participating in the rebellion was over 100,000. By 1792, a third of Saint-Domingue was under the control of the rebels, and France was ready to quell the rebellion.

==== Gens de Couleur rights ====
While the blacks are fighting for the end of slavery, mulattos were asking France to recognize them as full citizens and give them the right to participate in the colony's political life. The wealthy gens de couleur were given citizenship in May 1791, which caused tension between them and the grands blancs, and as a result, fighting broke out between the two groups. Because of this, the poorer gens de couleur, like the slaves, were also resentful of grands blancs, who were in the way of what was the beginning of equality for everyone in Saint-Domingue. They gave political rights to the gen de couleur, and sent Léger-Félicité Sonthonax to Saint-Domingue as its new governor; he was a man against slavery and the plantation owners. Many gens-de-couleur gained military experience within the Chasseurs-Volontaires de St-Domingue by participating in the Savannah Battle alongside the Americans against the British, this situation would help in the War of Knives when the British Navy would block the supply of the French troops in favor of Toussaint's Army. The period reach its height when the mulatto commander like Pétion, Beauvais, Pinchinnat, and more gained the battle of Pernier.

For the accomplishment of these civil rights, a corps of fewer than 300 men, 197 blacks and 23 mulattoes known as the Swiss was promised freedom at the end. Unfortunately, they were captured and brought to Jamaica, near Port-Royal to be sold where they refused to buy them. They were then brought to Mole St-Nicolas and executed by whites from l'Artibonite known as Saliniers.

==== War of Knives ====
While all of this was happening, Toussaint Louverture was training his own army in the ways of guerilla warfare, and helping the Spanish, who declared war against France in 1793; various outside powers assisted the Haitian insurgents during the early years of the revolution in hopes that they could take over Saint-Domingue from the French amidst the confusion of the French Revolutionary Wars. Louverture, alongside Dessalines and his army, would go back to the French in 1794, a while after France abolished slavery in the colonies.

By 1798, Toussaint and Rigaud had jointly contained both external and internal threats to the colony. In April 1798, British commander Thomas Maitland approached Toussaint to negotiate a British withdrawal, which was concluded in August.[5] In early 1799, Toussaint also independently negotiated "Toussaint's Clause" with the United States government, allowing American merchants to trade with Saint-Domingue despite the ongoing Quasi-War between the U.S. and France.

In July 1798, Toussaint and Rigaud traveled in a carriage together from Port-au-Prince to Le Cap to meet the recently arrived representative Théodore-Joseph d'Hédouville, sent by France's new Directory regime. Oral tradition asserts that during this carriage ride, Toussaint and Rigaud made a pact to collaborate against Hédouville's meddling. However, those efforts soon came undone, as Hédouville intentionally treated Rigaud with more favor than Toussaint, in an effort to sow tension between the two leaders. In a letter to Rigaud, Hédouville criticized "the perfidy of General Toussaint Louverture" and absolved Rigaud of Toussaint's authority as general-in-chief. He invited Rigaud to "take command of the Department of the South".[9] Hédouville eventually fled Saint-Domingue, sailing from Le Cap in October 1798 due to threats by Toussaint resulting in a year fight between the two generals.

Following his victory over Rigaud, Toussaint declared a general amnesty in July 1800. But Toussaint's general Jean-Jacques Dessalines became infamous during this period for carrying out brutal reprisals and massacres against Rigaud's supporters. Some historians have asserted that Toussaint himself ordered massacres, but delegated the killing to his generals to avoid culpability.[19] Many of Rigaud's generals were exiled to France and some to Cuba.

Later, Louverture would establish a Haitian constitution the Constitution of 1801 being the first constitution to abolish slavery and declared himself governor for life.

==== Expedition of St-Domingue ====
Napoleon Bonaparte did not accept this claim, and sent a troop of more than 30 000 men under the leadership of his brother-in-law Charles-Victor Emmanuel Leclerc. When the troops arrived in St-Domingue many Haitian generals refused to give access to the French navy to disembark and famously Henry Christophe rather burned the city on their commandment than betray Toussaint.

After the Battle of Crête-à-Pierrot in Petite-Rivière de L'Artibonite, the French realized they can not win against Louverture on the battlefield and decided to use a ruse to capture him. They invited him to a meeting in Gonaives, where he was captured and put on a boat Creole to Cap-Francais et another boat le Héros to Brest in France locked up Louverture, where he would die in Fort de Joux.

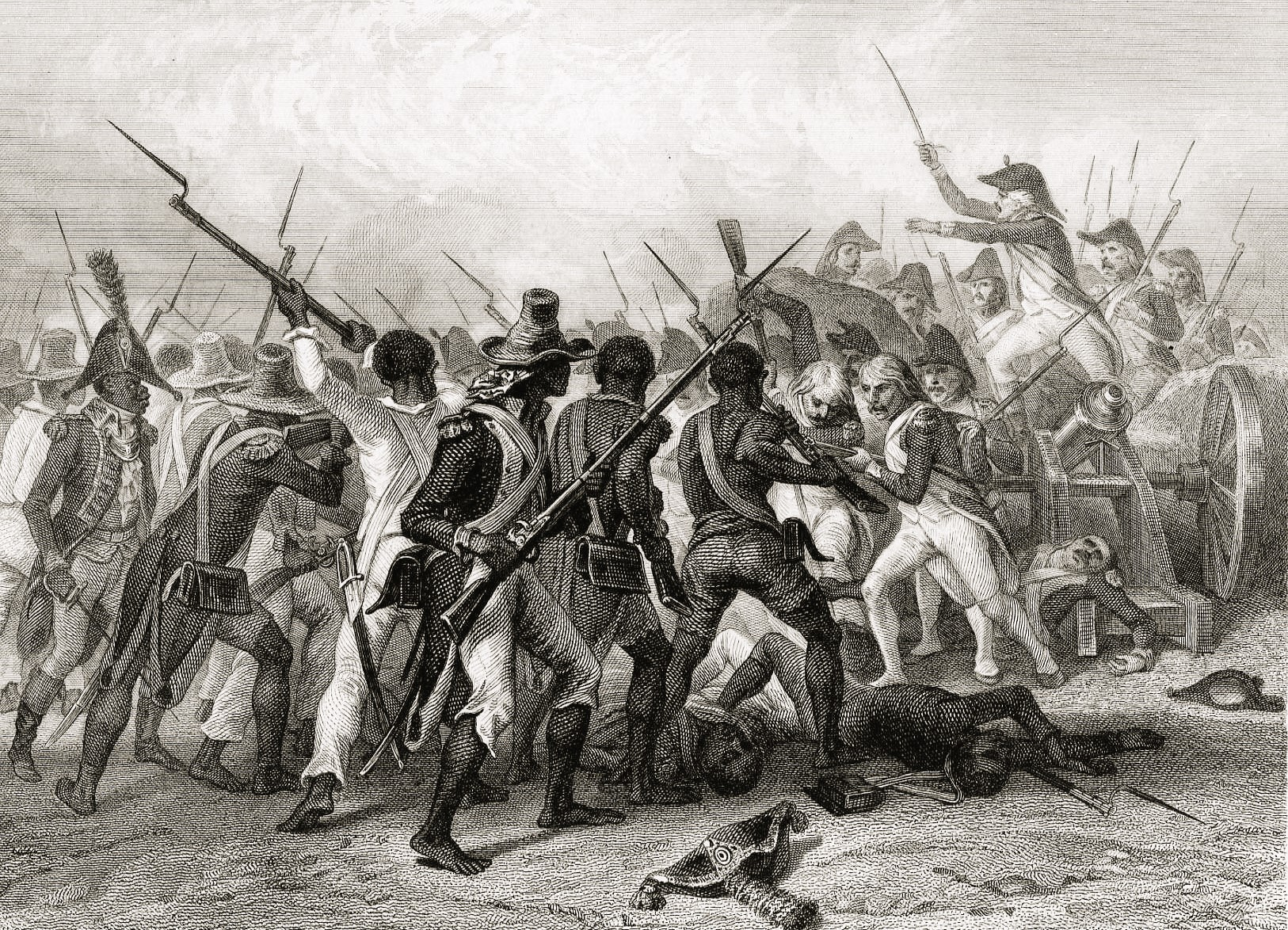
1839 illustration of the 1802 Battle of Crête-à-Pierrot

== Strategy ==
After France and Britain break their peace and declared war on each order, Dessalines capitalized on that concluding a deal with the British Navy, resulting in a blockade of the major bays of the island and seizing any French boat leaving the cities of Haiti to seek refuge elsewhere.

== Casualties ==
While the actions of the Armée Indigène were fueled by Enlightenment principles that advocated for the equality of all Frenchmen, the Haitian Revolution had many casualties. Both sides suffered losses from their own violence. The Haitians suffered about 200,000 casualties, while their French opponents suffered tens of thousands of casualties, mostly to yellow fever. Dessalines would later be known for the 1804 massacre of the French who did not want to leave Hayti, which lasted for two months.

== After the Independence ==
One of the first decrees of Dessalines after the Independence was to organize the army and their uniforms. The recruitment of young men in the army continued because there was still a threat of French invasion. The constitution of 1805 further organize the army and conscription:

- art 9. No person is worth being a Haitian who is not a good father, a good son, a good husband, and especially a good soldier.
- art 15. The Empire of Hayti is one and indivisible. Its territory is distributed into six military divisions.
- art 16. Each military division shall be commanded by a general of division.
- art 17. These generals of division shall be independent of one another and shall correspond directly with the Emperor or the general in chief appointed by his majesty.

== Legacy ==
Haiti was finally recognized by France in 1825, and later by the United States, in 1862. South American leader Simon Bolivar and Miranda traveled to Hayti looking for military support for the Liberation of Grand-Colombia.

== Fortification ==
After the Independence of Hayti, the Haitians were preparing for an eventual return of French troops, and Dessalines decide to reorganize the country. The basic of administrative division of the country went from parish to military garrison and department to military division. The Empire of Hayti had six military divisions each administratively autonomous from each under the general guidance of Jacques 1st, resulting in a quasi-federalism.

The emperor then ordered all division-general to build forts and docos in the mountains controlling all the major plains, bays, and all interior roads. Nowadays, most forts are still in place although they are not used for military purposes the most famous are:

- Citadelle Henry over the city of Cap-Haitian and the northern plains
- Fortification of Dessalines, the capital of the empire, designed by Alexandre Pétion overlooking the Artibonite Valley
- Twin forts Jacques and Alexandre over the city of Port-au-Prince and the Cul-de-Sac plaine
- Platon Citadelle over the city of Les Cayes and the Cayes plaine

== List of generals ==
=== Commanders-in-chief ===
- Toussaint Louverture, Commander-in-chief (1793-1803, governor)
- Jean-Jacques Dessalines, Commander-in-chief (1803-1804, first president and later emperor of Haiti)

=== Division generals ===
- Henry Christophe, commander of Dondon and the 1st division of North region
- Alexandre Pétion, commander of Arcahaie and the 2nd division of West region
- Nicolas Geffrard, and the 1st division of South region
- Andre Vernet, commander of Gonaives and the 1st division of West region

=== Brigadier-generals ===
- Étienne Élie Gerin, commander of Anse-à-Veau
- François Capois, commander of Port-de-Paix
- Magloire Ambroise, commander of Jacmel

=== Other generals ===
- Jacques Maurepas
- Jean-François Papillon
- Georges Biassou
- Joseph Balthazar Inginac

=== Adjutants-general ===
- Guy-Joseph Bonnet
