= Battle of Plaisance (1802) =

- Part of Saint-Domingue expedition
Date	5 March 1802
Location	Plaisance, Saint-Domingue
Result	French victory

Belligerents
France	Saint-Domingue

Commanders and leaders
Edme Desfourneaux	Toussaint Louverture

Strength
1,500 men	around 1500 men

Casualties and losses
267 killed or wounded	

The Battle of Plaisance occurred on 5 March 1802 as part of the Saint-Domingue expedition, aimed at suppressing the Haitian Revolution.

== Battle ==
On 5 March 1802, not knowing of Maurepas's surrender at Kellola, Toussaint attacked the French troops under general Desfourneaux.

At the start of the attack Toussaint noticed that part of Maurepas' 9th Regiment was fighting on the French side under Lubin Golart. Boiling with anger, Toussaint spurred his horse to meet Golart and cried "Soldiers of the 9th, dare you fire on your general and your brothers?". According to the memoirs of Toussaint's son Isaac "these words had the effect of a thunderclap; they fell to their knees, and if the European soldiers had not fired on him and advanced, the whole 9th Regiment would have gone over to Toussaint Louverture".

In his report on 7th March to chief of staff Charles Dugua, Edme Étienne Borne Desfourneaux stated :

Toussaint attacked me on the 5th and brought fierce force to bear on my position, the Morne Bedouret, but he was dislodged and finally the army was victorious right along the line. Toussaint advanced to within ten paces of the detachment from the 9th Black Grenadiers and said to them "How, my children, you fight against your father!". "It is a brigand" cried Placide Lebrun, sub-lieutenant in the grenadiers, "fire!". Toussaint's horse was killed, a soldier of the 30th launched himself at him, this soldier was killed. Toussaint's guards covered him, they were overthrown; but he escaped wounded, it is said, in the shoulder.

Defeated, Toussaint retired to Marmelade and Bayonnet, occupied positions on Le Morne. In another report to Dugua on 14th March, Desfourneaux stated there had been 267 killed or wounded and a larger number sick.

== Bibliography ==
- Bell, Madison Smartt (2007). Toussaint Louverture: A Biography. Pantheon. ISBN 978-0-375-42337-6.
- Schœlcher, Victor (1889). Vie de Toussaint Louverture (in French). Paris: P. Ollendorff. (republished 1982 by Karthala).
