= Siege of Port-au-Prince =

Siege of Port-au-Prince may refer to:

- Siege of Port-au-Prince (1793)
- Siege of Port-au-Prince (1803)
