= Independence Day (Haiti) =

Public holiday celebrated on 1 January

Independence Day or Haitian Independence Day (French: Le Jour de l'Indépendance Haïtienne) in the Republic of Haiti, located in the Greater Antilles, Latin America, the West Indies and the Caribbean as a whole, has celebrated annually as a public holiday on every 1st of January along with New Year's Day, commemorating the nation's liberation from the French Empire. It also mark the birth of the world's first and oldest independent free black-led republic in the New World since 1804, achieved through an unprecedented successful slave revolt against French colonial rule during the Haitian Revolution.

On 1 January 1804, Jean-Jacques Dessalines proclaimed Haiti's independence from the French in the port city of Gonaïves, ending the 12 year-long war against the bondage imposed upon the people by the French planters. This date is also special as the island, previously called Saint-Domingue, obtained a new name - Haiti - meaning "Land of the mountains" in Taino-Arawak.

In honor of Independence Day, nationwide celebrations and festivities are held with additional special tributes such as renditions of the anthem and firework shows paying respect to Jean-Jacques Dessalines, hailed as the hero of the revolution. Additionally, military parades are held in the nation's capital city of Port-au-Prince that are accompanied by cultural showcases with public figures also delivering speeches on Haiti and its future.

Central to the celebrations is the tradition of eating Soup Joumou, a symbolic dish cherished by Haitians as a symbol of equality and freedom due to the fact the French had forbidden the enslaved to consume it during colonial rule. Upon independence, Haitians embraced the soup, making it take on new meanings of defiance and liberation. Since then, its consumption has been enshrined as a declaration that French rule is a thing of the past in Haiti.

== Haitian Declaration of Independence ==
Declaration of Independence poster

The Haitian Declaration of Independence, a key document in the history of Haiti, was given along with an Independence Day speech by Jean-Jacques Dessalines. The document was not written by Dessalines himself though, instead relying on his secretary, Louis Boisrond-Tonnerre, to transcribe his spoken words due to his inability to speak or write in French. Divided into three sections, the most substantive of the declaration itself is the prologue, titled "Le Général en Chef Au Peuple d’Hayti," which translates to "The Chief General to the People of Haiti."

Afterwards, Dessalines gave his speech. Delivered in Haitian Creole, he articulated that mere expulsion of the French from Haitian soil was not enough, desiring instead to exact vengeance and retribution against the "French White Creoles" so that they may never again enslave the Haitian people. Such sentiment resulted in the 1804 Haiti Massacre where thousands of white people were killed.

The original document has been lost to time. However, two copies of the declaration have survived, both being discovered by Julia Gaffield, a postgraduate student from Duke University, in the UK National Archives in 2010.
