= German Haitians =

Haitians of German descent

Deutsche Haitianer
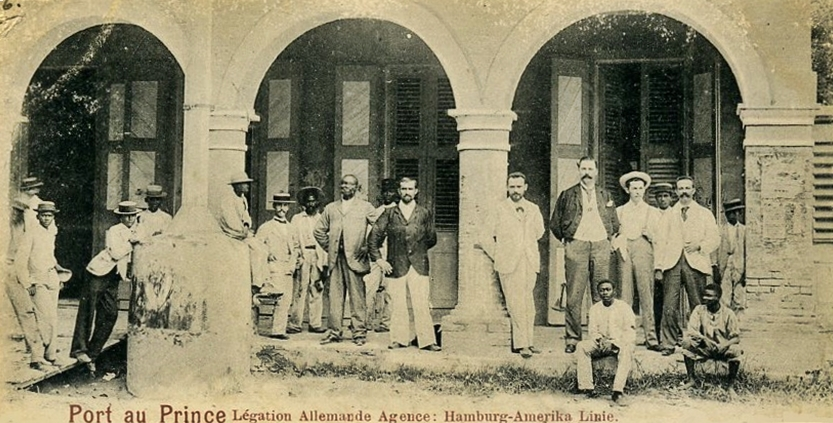
- German legation of the Hamburg-America Line, c. 1900

Languages
- German

Religion
- Christianity and Judaism

Related ethnic groups
- Germans, German Caribbeans

German Haitians (Haitian Creole: Ayisyen Alman yo) are Haitians of German descent or Germans with Haitian citizenship.

== History ==
=== Colonial and revolutionary period ===
The earliest known German settlement in Saint-Domingue was in Bombardopolis, south of Môle-Saint-Nicolas, in the département of Nord-Ouest. About a thousand Germans, invited by the French government, came to Bombardopolis in the eighteenth century to establish farms. However, due to the region being one of the least fertile parts of Haiti, the German population soon left for the French colonies of Guyana and Louisiana. A second group of Germans were the soldiers who came with the French Leclerc expedition.

The twelfth and thirteenth articles of the 1805 preliminary declaration of the Constitution of Haiti forbade whites from owning property in the country, with the exception of naturalized Germans, Poles and women.

=== Economic ascendancy ===
Starting in the mid-1800s, Germans began to settle and establish commercial enterprises in Haiti. The Haitian market was open to foreign trade and had little competition from other nations. The German community was willing to integrate into Haitian society. Some Germans married into Haiti's most prominent families. This enabled them to bypass the constitutional prohibition against foreigners owning land. In 1910, Haitian Germans controlled 80% of Haiti's international commerce. Though German Haitians only numbered about 200, they wielded a disproportionate amount of economic power. For example, they owned and operated utilities in Port-au-Prince and Cap-Haïtien and also controlled the Port-au-Prince main wharf.

=== First World War ===
When the US invaded Haiti in 1915, they promptly jailed and confiscated all Germans and their possessions. This was one of their primary goals. During the First World War (1914-1918), when the US entered the war, Germans still in Haïti were jailed in Fort Nationale, under the guard of the US military. At the end of the First World War, most Germans permanently left Haïti due to the hostility of the American occupying force. The Germans who stayed were made up those who had family ties on the island. The US government never returned the confiscated German belongings.

=== Second World War ===
In 1940 during the Second World War, when Haïti declared war on Germany, again all German properties were confiscated. The Haitians later passed a law to return them to their rightful owner. German Haitians who kept their German citizenship were imprisoned. In 1942, these German war prisoners were sent to the US at American request, as guarantee for the US prisoners held in Germany. Only in 1946, when Dumarsais Estimé became president, did Haiti allow these German prisoners, detained at that time on Ellis Island in New York, to return to Haiti. It has been reported that the German-Haitian prisoners were offered American citizenship but rejected this, preferring to be sent back to Haiti.

== Notable German Haitians ==
- Joe Gaetjens, soccer player for the United States national team in the 1950 FIFA World Cup
- Werner Jaegerhuber, composer
- Philippe Kieffer, Free French Forces hero (Alsatian descent)
- TiCorn (born Cornelia Schütt), folk singer and songwriter

== See also ==
- United States occupation of Haiti
- Germany–Haiti relations
