= German Caribbean people =

German Caribbean people are people who live in the Caribbean, but come from Germany, or are descended from Germans. German Caribbean people include:

- German Haitians
- Germans in Jamaica
- German immigration to Puerto Rico

== See also ==
- German interest in the Caribbean for German government policies
- Ernst Thälmann Island for a presumable German possession in the Caribbean
