= Augustin Clerveaux =

Augustin Clerveaux (1763–1804) was a Haitian general.

== Biography ==
Clerveaux was born in 1763 in Marmelade, though other sources say he was born in 1772. A mulatto, he was the son of aristocratic landowner and captain of the colonial militia Augustin-Anne Clerveaux; he was educated in France.

On 6 December 1793, he assisted the Spanish in occupying Marmelade and joined Toussaint Louverture, who appointed Clerveaux as battalion commander. When his commander joined the forces of the French First Republic, Clerveaux followed and rose to the rank of brigade commander of the 6th Demi-Brigade when it was formed, and served as its commander. He later reached the rank of brigadier general, and was governor of Samana and Cibao after participating in the 1801 campaign against Santo Domingo.

As with Paul Louverture and Jacques Maurepas, when the French expedition arrived, he surrendered on 17 February 1802. Consequently, the Consulate recognized his military rank on 30 July; however, on the night of 13–14 October at Haut du Cap, he joined the Haitian rebels because the French began to renege on their initial promises.

On 1 January 1804, Clerveaux signed the Haitian Declaration of Independence with the rank of major general. He died in Dondon later that year, with some believing he was possibly poisoned by Henri Christophe.
