= Sanité Bélair =

Haitian revolutionary

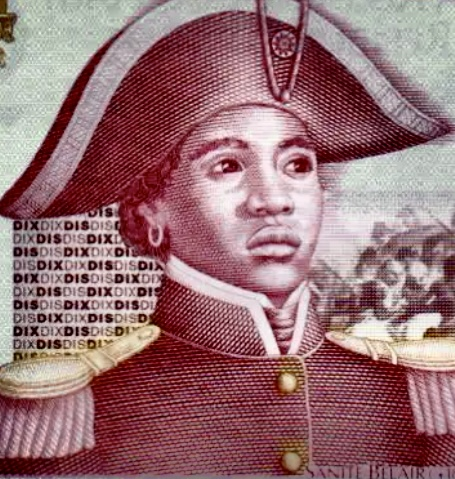
- Born: c. 1781; Verrettes, Saint-Domingue
- Died: 5 October 1802
- Other name: Suzanne Bélair
- Spouse: Charles Bélair
- Military career
- Rank: lieutenant
- Conflicts: Haitian Revolution; Saint-Domingue expedition

Suzanne Bélair, called Sanité Bélair, (c. 1781 – 5 October 1802), was a Haitian revolutionary and lieutenant in the army of Toussaint Louverture.

Bélair was born an affranchi in Verrettes, Haiti. In 1796 she married Brigade commander and later General Charles Bélair, a nephew, aide-de-camp, and lieutenant to Toussaint Louverture and who had rallied to the Saint-Domingue general Maynaud and the French Republic. She was an active participant in the Haitian Revolution, became a sergeant and later a lieutenant during the conflict with French troops of the Saint-Domingue expedition.

Suzanne, known by the nickname Sanité, was a freedwoman born in Verrettes in 1781. Sanité Bélair urged her husband to side with the independence movement.

== Capture and execution ==
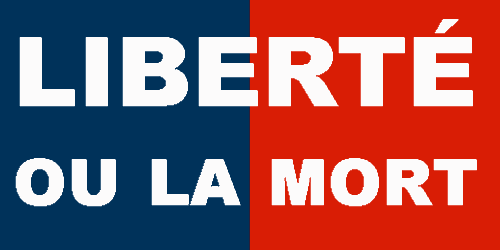
Flag of Haitian insurgents 1803

Chased by Faustin Répussard's column of the French army, the Belairs took refuge in the Artibonite department. Répussard launched a surprise attack on Corail-Mirrault, and captured Sanité Bélair. Her husband turned himself over as well to avoid being separated from her. Both were sentenced to death, her spouse was to be executed by firing squad and she by decapitation because of her sex. As she watched Bélair's execution, she calmly asked him to die bravely, then went to her own execution, refusing to wear a blindfold. It is said that at her capture, when threatened with beheading, she successfully asserted the right to an honorable soldier's death by musketry, and standing before their muzzles cried "Viv libète! A ba esclavaj!" ("Long live freedom! Down with slavery!"). She refused to be blindfolded, and the executioner was unable to get her to bend her back and place her head on the block, the officer commanding the detachment was obliged to have her shot.

== Legacy ==
2004 Haitian banknote featuring Sanité Bélair,(artist: Richard Barbot)

Sanite Bélair is considered as one of the heroes of the Haitian Revolution. In 2004, she was featured on the ten-gourd banknote of the Haitian gourde for the "Bicentennial of Haiti" Commemorative series.

In 2023, she was one of the figures featured at the Panthéon, in Paris, in a double art and history exhibition highlighting little-known personalities who contributed to the abolition of the slave system.

She is featured in the book and play Opéra poussière by Jean d'Amérique. He brings Sanité Bélair back to life, and she launches the #HéroïneEnColère movement to demand a proper place in the country's history and connect the heroine with the struggles against all oppressions today.

Sanité is depicted holding a rifle and seated with her husband in the 2002 painting Charles and Sanité Belair by British artist Kimathi Donkor as part of his series 'Caribbean Passion: Haiti 1804'.
