= Battle of Vertières =

1803 battle of the Saint-Domingue expedition

Coordinates: 19.7333°N 72.2244°W

- Part of the Saint-Domingue expedition
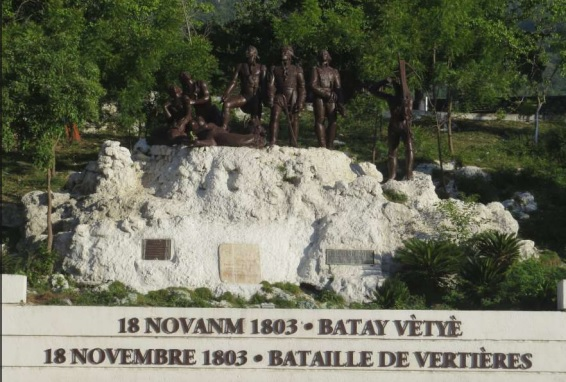
- Monument erected by the government of Paul Magloire to commemorate the battle
Date	18 November 1803
Location	Near Cap-Français, Saint-Domingue
Result	Rebel victory: End of French rule in Saint-Domingue

Belligerents
Indigenous Army	France

Commanders and leaders
Jean-Jacques Dessalines; François Capois	Donatien de Rochambeau

Strength
27,000	2,000

Casualties and losses
1,200 killed 2,000 wounded	130 killed 400 wounded

The Battle of Vertières (French: Bataille de Vertières; Haitian Creole: Batay Vètyè) was the last major battle of the Saint-Domingue expedition and the final phase of the Haitian Revolution. It was fought on 18 November 1803 between the rebel Indigenous Army under Jean Jacques Dessalines and François Capois and French forces under Donatien de Rochambeau, who were committed to regaining control of the island.

The battle took place at Vertières, situated just south of Cap-Français in the Nord department. By the end of October 1803, the rebels fighting the French expeditionary troops had already taken over most of Saint-Domingue. The only places controlled by the French forces were Môle St. Nicolas, held by Noailles, and Cap-Français, where, with 5,000 troops, French General Rochambeau was at bay.

== Background ==
In 1802, Governor-General Toussaint Louverture was arrested by French forces. From the ship that would lead him to his prison cell, and eventual death, Louverture said: "In overthrowing me, you have done no more than cut down the trunk of the tree of black liberty in Saint-Domingue. It will spring back from the roots, for they are numerous and deep." After the arrest of Louverture, Jean Jacques Dessalines revolted against the French in October 1802, correctly fearing they planned to restore slavery.

== Battle ==
Dessalines defeated the French army numerous times before the battle of Vertières. During the night of 17–18 November 1803, the rebels positioned their few guns to blast Fort Bréda, located on the habitation where Louverture had worked as a coachman under François Capois. As the French trumpets sounded the alarm, Clervaux, a low-ranking rebel, fired the first shot. Capois, mounted on a great horse, led his half-brigade forward despite storms of bullets from the forts on his left. The approach to Charrier ran up a long ravine under the guns of Vertières. French fire killed a number of rebels in the rebel columns, but they closed ranks and clambered past their dead, singing. Capois' horse was shot, faltered and fell, tossing him off his saddle. Capois picked himself up, drew his sword; brandished it over his head and ran onwards shouting: "Forward! Forward!"

Rochambeau was watching from the rampart of Vertières. As Capois charged forth, the French drums rolled a sudden cease-fire. Suddenly, the battle stopped. A French staff officer mounted his horse and rode toward Capois. With a loud voice, he shouted: "The Captain-general sends compliments to the general who has just covered himself with such glory!" Then he saluted the rebels, returned to his position, and the fighting resumed. Dessalines sent his reserves under Gabart, the youngest of rebel generals, while Jean-Philippe Daut, an officer in Rochambeau’s guard of grenadiers, formed for a final charge. But Gabart, Capois, and Clervaux, the last fighting with a musket in hand and with one epaulette shot away, repulsed the desperate French counterattack.

A sudden downpour with thunder and lightning drenched the battlefield. Under cover of the storm, Rochambeau pulled back from Vertières, knowing he was defeated and that Saint-Domingue was lost for France.

== Aftermath ==
The next morning, Rochambeau sent Duveyrier to negotiate with Dessalines. By the end of the day, the terms of the French surrender were settled. Rochambeau was allowed ten days to embark the remainder of his army and leave Saint-Domingue. The wounded French soldiers were left behind under lock and key with the expectation that they would be returned to France, but they were drowned by the rebels a few days later.

This battle occurred less than two months before Dessalines' proclamation of the independent nation of Haiti on 1 January 1804 as the "First Black-dominated Republic" in both the Americas and the New World. During the Second Restoration, the Kingdom of France refused to recognize the independence acquired against the French Republic. In 1826, King Charles X demanded that Haiti pay a compensation of 150 million gold francs before France would recognize the young republic's independence. In 1838, under the July Monarchy, this debt was reduced by King Louis-Philippe to 90 million francs and was paid to France until well into the 1900’s. November 18 has been widely celebrated since then as a Day of Victory in Haiti.
