= 1804 Haitian massacre =

1804 massacre of French people in Haiti

1804 Haiti massacre
- Part of the aftermath of the Haitian Revolution
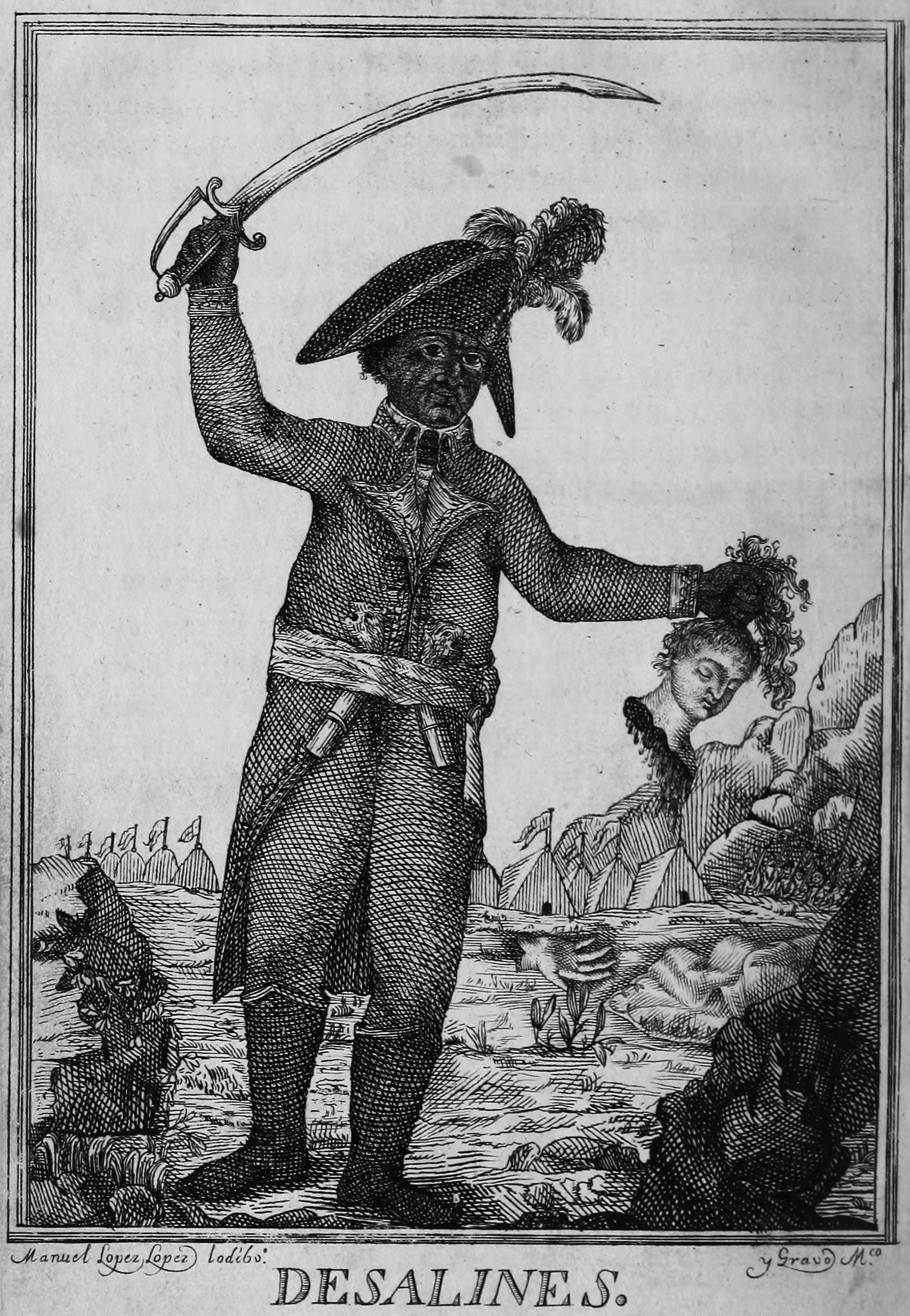
- 1806 Spanish poster depicting General Jean-Jacques Dessalines holding a white woman's severed head
- Location: First Empire of Haiti
- Date: February 1804 – 22 April 1804
- Target: White Haitians (Mainly French people, while excluding Poles and Germans)
- Attack type: Genocide
- Deaths: 3,000–7,000
- Perpetrator: Haitian Army (led by Jean-Jacques Dessalines)
- Motive: Anti-French sentiment Revenge for slavery

The 1804 Haiti massacre was a genocide carried out by Afro-Haitian soldiers, mostly former slaves, under orders from Jean-Jacques Dessalines against much of the remaining European population in Haiti, which mainly included French people. The Haitian Revolution defeated the French army in November 1803 and the Haitian Declaration of Independence happened on 1 January 1804. From February 1804 until 22 April 1804, between 3,000 and 7,000 people were killed.

The massacre excluded surviving Polish Legionnaires, who had defected from the French legion to become allied with the enslaved Africans, as well as the Germans who did not take part in the slave trade, and some other select whites. They were instead granted full citizenship under the constitution, even though Dessalines had declared that all Haitians would be considered "black".

Nicholas Robins, Adam Jones, and Dirk Moses theorize that the executions were a "subaltern genocide", in which an oppressed group uses genocidal means to destroy its oppressors. Philippe Girard has suggested the threat of reinvasion and reinstatement of slavery as some of the motives for the massacre.

Throughout the early-to-mid nineteenth century, the events of the massacre were well known in the United States. Additionally, many Saint Domingue refugees moved from Saint-Domingue to the U.S., settling in New Orleans, Charleston, New York, Baltimore, and other coastal cities. These events spurred fears of potential uprisings in the Southern U.S. and they also polarized public opinion on the question of the abolition of slavery.

== Background ==
=== Slavery ===
Henri Christophe's personal secretary, who was enslaved for much of his life, attempted to explain the incident by referencing the cruel treatment of black slaves by white slaveholders in Saint-Domingue:

Have they not hung up men with heads downward, drowned them in sacks, crucified them on planks, buried them alive, crushed them in mortars? Have they not forced them to consume faeces? And, having flayed them with the lash, have they not cast them alive to be devoured by worms, or onto anthills, or lashed them to stakes in the swamp to be devoured by mosquitoes? Have they not thrown them into boiling cauldrons of cane syrup? Have they not put men and women inside barrels studded with spikes and rolled them down mountainsides into the abyss? Have they not consigned these miserable blacks to man-eating dogs until the latter, sated by human flesh, left the mangled victims to be finished off with bayonet and poniard?

=== Haitian Revolution ===
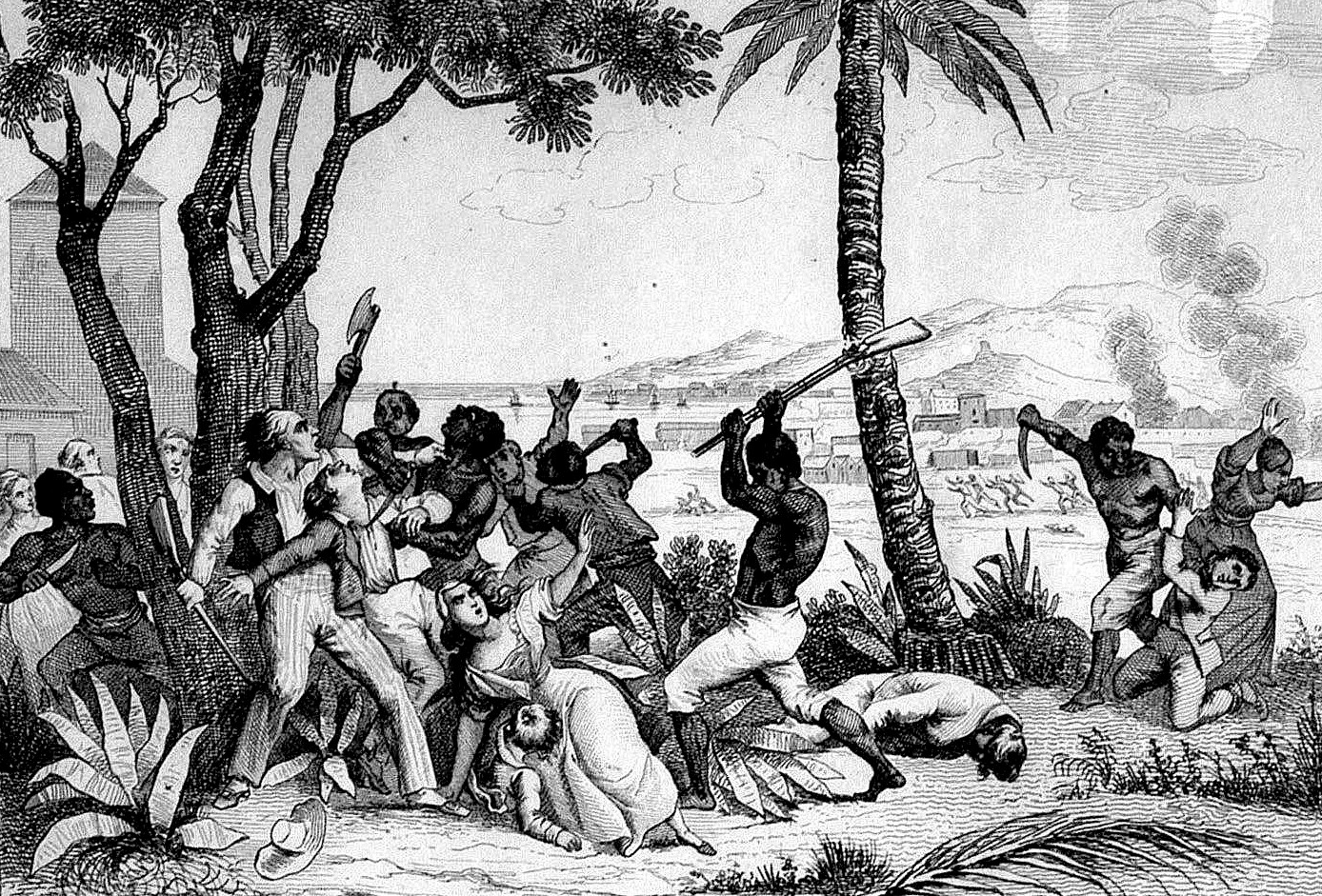
"Burning of the Plaine du Cap – Massacre of whites by the blacks." On August 22, 1791, slaves destroyed plantations in Le Cap, and killed all the French population in the region.

In 1791, a man of Jamaican origin named Dutty Boukman became the leader of the enslaved Africans held on a large plantation in Cap-Français. In the wake of the French Revolution, he planned to massacre all the French living in Cap-Français. On 22 August 1791, the enslaved Africans descended on Le Cap, where they destroyed the plantations and executed all the French who lived in the region. King Louis XVI was accused of indifference to the massacre, while the slaves seemed to think the king was on their side. In July 1793, the French in Les Cayes were massacred.

Despite the French proclamation of emancipation, the blacks sided with the Spanish who came to occupy the region. In July 1794, Spanish forces stood by while the black troops of Jean-François massacred the French whites in Fort-Dauphin.

Philippe Girard writes that genocide was openly considered as a strategy by both sides in the conflict. White forces sent by Napoleon Bonaparte committed massacres but were defeated before they could accomplish genocide, while an army under Jean-Jacques Dessalines, composed mainly of former slaves, was able to wipe out the white Haitian population. Girard describes five main factors leading to the massacre, which he describes as a genocide: (1) Haitian soldiers were influenced by the French Revolution to justify murder and large-scale massacres on ideological grounds; (2) economic interests motivated French planters to want to quell the uprising, as well as influencing former slaves to want to kill the planters and take ownership of the plantations; (3) a slave revolt had been ongoing for more than a decade, and was itself a reaction to a century of brutal colonial rule, making violent death commonplace and therefore easier to accept; (4) the massacre was a form of class warfare in which former slaves were able to take revenge against their former masters; and (5) the last stages of the war became a racial conflict pitting whites against blacks and mulattoes, in which racial hatred, dehumanization, and conspiracy theories all facilitated genocide.

Dessalines came to power after France's defeat and subsequent evacuation from what was previously known as Saint-Domingue. In November 1803, three days after Rochambeau's forces surrendered, Dessalines ordered the execution of 800 French soldiers who had been left behind due to illness during the evacuation. He did guarantee the safety of the remaining white civilian population. However, Jeremy Popkin writes that statements by Dessalines such as "There are still French on the island, and still you considered yourselves free," spoke of a hostile attitude toward the remaining white minority.

Rumors about the white population suggested that they would try to leave the country to convince foreign powers to invade and reintroduce slavery. Discussions between Dessalines and his advisers openly suggested that the white population should be put to death for the sake of national security. Whites trying to leave Haiti were prevented from doing so.

On 1 January 1804, Dessalines proclaimed Haiti an independent nation as the first modern independent Black republic. In mid-February, Dessalines told some cities (Léogâne, Jacmel, Les Cayes) to prepare for mass massacres. On 22 February 1804, he signed a decree ordering that all whites in all cities should be put to death. The weapons used should be silent weapons such as knives and bayonets rather than gunfire, so that the killing could be done more quietly, and avoid warning intended victims by the sound of gunfire and thereby giving them the opportunity to escape.

== Massacre ==
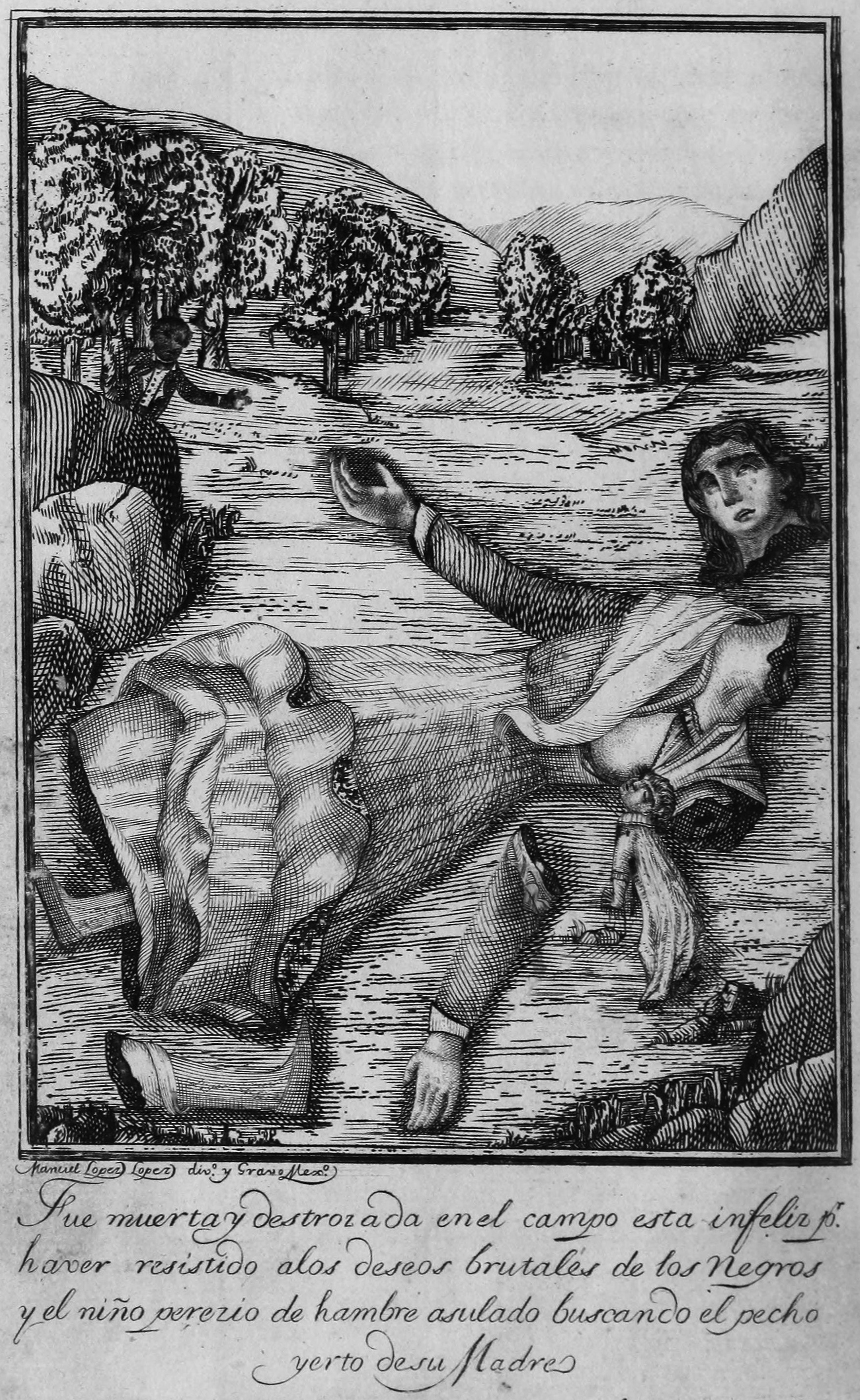
Woman killed and mutilated in the massacre with her child perishing from starvation

During February and March, Dessalines traveled among the cities of Haiti to assure himself that his orders were carried out. Despite his orders, the massacres were often not carried out until he visited the cities in person.

The course of the massacre showed an almost identical pattern in every city he visited. Before his arrival, there were only a few killings, despite his orders. When Dessalines arrived, he first spoke about the atrocities committed by former white authorities, such as Rochambeau and Leclerc, after which he demanded that his orders about mass killings of the area's white population should be put into effect. Reportedly, he ordered the unwilling to take part in the killings, especially men of mixed race, so that the blame should not be placed solely on the black population. Mass killings took place on the streets and on places outside the cities.

In Port-au-Prince, only a few killings had occurred in the city despite the orders. After Dessalines arrived on 18 March, the number of killings escalated. According to a merchant captain, about 800 people were killed in the city, while about 50 survived. On 18 April 1804, Dessalines arrived at Cap-Haïtien. Only a handful of killings had taken place there before his arrival, but the killings escalated to a massacre on the streets and outside the city after his arrival. Sources created at the time stated that 3,000 people were killed in Cap-Haïtien; Philippe Girard writes that this figure was unrealistic as in the post-evacuation of the French people the settlement had only 1,700 white people.

Before his departure from a city, Dessalines would proclaim an amnesty for all the whites who had survived in hiding during the massacre. When these people left their hiding place however, most (French) were killed as well. Many whites were, however, hidden and smuggled out to sea by foreigners. However, there were notable exceptions to the ordered killings. A contingent of Polish defectors were given amnesty and granted Haitian citizenship for their renouncement of French allegiance and support of Haitian independence. Dessalines referred to the Poles as "the White Negroes of Europe", as an expression of his solidarity and gratitude. According to historian Julia Gaffield, most of those killed were former members of the National Guard, a pro-French militia.

The French, who were one of the two main targets of the 1804 Haiti Massacre that Dessalines and his company specifically declared a massacre on, made up the overwhelming majority of the white population. Dessalines' secretary Louis Boisrond-Tonnerre complained that the declaration of independence was not aggressive enough, saying that "...we should use the skin of a white man as a parchment, his skull as an inkwell, his blood for ink, and a bayonet for a pen.", Dessalines later himself specifically pledged to "kill every Frenchman who soils the land of freedom with his sacrilegious presence."

The people chosen to be killed were targeted primarily based on three criteria: "skin color, citizenship and vocation." While some whites, such as Poles and Germans who were granted citizenship and "a few non-French veterans and American merchants, along with some useful professionals such as priests and doctors" were spared, political affiliation was not considered. The white victims were almost entirely French, commensurate with their share in the white population of Haiti. About his targets of the massacre, Dessalines' slogan exemplified his mission to eradicate the white population with the saying "Break the eggs, take out the [sic] yolk [a pun on the word 'yellow' which means both yolk and mulatto] and eat the white." Upper class whites were not the only target; any white of any socioeconomic status was also to be killed, including the urban poor known as petits blancs. During the massacre, stabbing, beheading, and disemboweling were common.

In parallel to the killings, plundering and rape also occurred. As elsewhere, the majority of the women were initially not killed, and the soldiers were reportedly somewhat hesitant to do so. Dessalines's advisers, however, pointed out that the white Haitians would not disappear if the women were left to give birth to white men, and after this, Dessalines ordered that the women should be killed as well, with the exception of those who agreed to marry non-white men.

One of the most notorious of the massacre participants was Jean Zombi, a mulatto resident of Port-au-Prince who was known for his brutality. One account describes how Zombi stopped a white man on the street, stripped him naked, and took him to the stair of the Presidential Palace, where he killed him with a dagger. Dessalines was reportedly among the spectators; he was said to be "horrified" by the episode. In Haitian Vodou tradition, the figure of Jean Zombi has become a prototype for the zombie.

At the conclusion of the slaughter, Dessalines reportedly stated: "I will go to my grave happy. We have avenged our brothers. Haiti has become a blood-red spot on the face of the globe!"

== Aftermath ==
=== Effects in Haiti ===
By the end of April 1804, some 3,000 to 5,000 people had been killed and the white Haitians were practically eradicated, excluding a select group of whites who were given amnesty. Those spared consisted of the Polish ex-soldiers who were given Haitian citizenship for helping black Haitians in fights against white colonialists; a small group of German colonists invited to the north-west region before the revolution; and a group of medical doctors and professionals. Reportedly, also people with connections to officers in the Haitian army were spared, as well as the women who agreed to marry non-white men.

Dessalines did not try to hide the massacre from the world. In an official proclamation of 8 April 1804, he stated, "We have given these true cannibals war for war, crime for crime, outrage for outrage. Yes, I have saved my country, I have avenged America." He referred to the massacre as an act of national authority. Dessalines regarded the elimination of the white Haitians an act of political necessity, as they were regarded as a threat to the peace between the black and the free people of color. It was also regarded as a necessary act of vengeance. Dessalines' secretary Boisrond-Tonnerre stated, "For our declaration of independence, we should have the skin of a white man for parchment, his skull for an inkwell, his blood for ink, and a bayonet for a pen!"

Dessalines was eager to assure that Haiti was not a threat to other nations. He directed efforts to establish friendly relations also to nations where slavery was still allowed.

In the 1805 constitution, all citizens were defined as "black". The constitution also banned white men from owning land, except for people already born or born in the future to white women who were naturalized as Haitian citizens and the Germans and Poles who got Haitian citizenship. The massacre had a long-lasting effect on the view of the Haitian Revolution. It contributed to a legacy of racial hostility in Haitian society.

Girard writes in his book Paradise Lost: "Despite all of Dessalines' efforts at rationalization, the massacres were as inexcusable as they were foolish." Trinidadian historian C. L. R. James concurred with this view in his breakthrough work The Black Jacobins, writing that "the unfortunate country... was ruined economically, its population lacking in social culture, [and] had its difficulties doubled by this massacre". James wrote that the massacre was "not policy but revenge, and revenge has no place in politics".

Philippe Girard wrote that "when the genocide was over, Haiti's white population was virtually non-existent." Citing Girard, Nicholas Robins and Adam Jones describe the massacre as a "subaltern genocide" in which a previously disadvantaged group used a genocide to destroy their previous oppressors.

=== Effect on American society ===
At the time of the American Civil War, a major pretext for Southern whites, most of whom did not own slaves, to support slave owners (and ultimately fight for the Confederacy) was fear of a genocide similar to the Haitian massacre of 1804. The perceived failure of abolition in Haiti and Jamaica were explicitly referred to in Confederate discourse as a reason for secession. The slave revolt was a prominent theme in the discourse of Southern political leaders and had influenced U.S. public opinion since the events took place. Historian Kevin Julius writes:

As abolitionists loudly proclaimed that "All men are created equal", echoes of armed slave insurrections and racial genocide sounded in Southern ears. Much of their resentment towards the abolitionists can be seen as a reaction to the events in Haiti.

In the run-up to the 1860 United States presidential election, the Chief Justice of the United States Roger B. Taney wrote "I remember the horrors of St. Domingo" and said that the election "will determine whether anything like this is to be visited upon our own southern countrymen."

Abolitionists recognized the strength of this argument on public opinion in both the North and South. In correspondence to the New York Times in September 1861 (during the war), an abolitionist named J. B. Lyon addressed this as a prominent argument of his opponents:

We don't know any better than to imagine that emancipation would result in the utter extinction of civilization in the South, because the slave-holders, and those in their interest, have persistently told us ... and they always instance the 'horrors of St. Domingo.'

Lyon argued, however, that the abolition of slavery in the various Caribbean colonies of the European empires before the 1860s showed that an end to slavery could be achieved peacefully.

== Academic study ==
Girard writes that the 1804 massacres must be understood in their specific, Haitian context. He classifies the massacres as a genocide, and contrasts them with their historical counterparts. The Haitian massacres "lack the moral clarity typically associated with genocide," he says, because the French colonists had abused Black Haitians and would have carried out their own genocide had they won the conflict. Girard contrasts this with the Holocaust and other genocides perpetrated by the dominant group in a society:

Haitian genocide, in contrast, was a form of revenge exacted by an oppressed group against those who dominated it, much like the Rwandan and Cambodian genocides.

Girard also contrasts the overt nature of the Haitian massacres and the willingness of leadership to take responsibility for and justify the massacres with the diffusion and obfuscation of responsibility by both rank and file participants and leaders in other genocides.

== See also ==
- History of Haiti
- Parsley massacre
- Beheadings of Moca
- Anti-French sentiment
- Anti-white racism
- List of massacres in Haiti
