= TiCorn =

Folk singer and songwriter

- Also known as: Ti Corn, Ti-Corn
- Born: Cornelia Schütt; August 11, 1953 (age 73); Heiligenberg, Germany
- Origin: Cap-Haïtien, Haiti
- Genres: Haitian Folk, World music
- Years active: 1978–present
- Label: Tortuga Records
- Website: ticorn.com

Cornelia Schütt (born August 11, 1953), known by her stage name TiCorn, is a Haitian folk singer and songwriter.

== Early years ==
Cornelia Schütt was born in Heiligenberg (Baden-Württemberg, Germany). Two months after her birth, she relocated to Cap-Haïtien, Haiti, where she spent her years growing up. Born to German parents from Berlin, her father Carl Otto Schütt, at the age of 18, joined the family business in Cap-Haïtien that was in operation since 1832 and made frequent trips back and forth from Germany. After returning from an intern camp in the United States after World War II, he returned to Germany and met Corneilia' mother, Ingrid, an educated architect. She moved with him to Haiti to attend the Coffee farm. She received her nickname "TiCorn" ("Ti" is a colloquialism of the French word "petite," meaning "little" or "small" - thus "Little Corn[elia]") from her nanny Anna Colo, which she grew up with in Haiti.

== Career ==
TiCorn released her first LP in 1979, titled "Haïti." She also played a singing role in the German film, Caribia. Although she does not consider herself an actress.

== Discography ==
- Haïti (1979)

== Filmography ==
- Caribia (1978)
