= François Capois =

Haitian rebel and army officer (1766–1806)

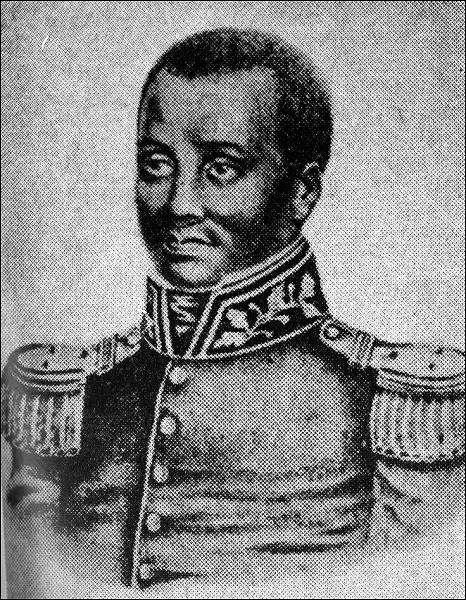
François Capois

François Capois (French pronunciation: [fʁɑ̃swa kapwa]; 1766 – 8 October 1806) was a Haitian rebel and army officer who fought in the Haitian Revolution. He was born in Port-de-Paix, Saint-Domingue (present-day Haiti) on the island of Hispaniola, on the plantation of Laveaux/Lapointe. His name was a transformation of the name cappouet, owner of the plantation.

== Military career ==
His military career began in 1793 after a visit with independence leader Toussaint Louverture at Port-de-Paix. Then under the colonel Jacques Maurepas he was a member of the 9th brigade. His rank in the army changed quickly, first to Lieutenant, then to Captain of the 3rd Battalion. He participated under general Jacques Maurepas against all expeditions and invasions in the north-eastern region of the island. Capois is mostly known for his extraordinary courage and especially his herculean bravery at the Battle of Vertières in which the French general Viscount of Rochambeau, commander of Napoleon's army in Saint-Domingue (French Haiti), even called a brief cease-fire to congratulate him.

=== Capturing of Port-de-Paix and Tortuga Island ===
After receiving new troops from France, Rochambeau dispatched General Clauzel against Port-de-Paix which Capois was forced to evacuate, but the fearless black general redeemed his defeat by storming the Petit-Fort where he captured the ammunition, of which he was in great need. After his success at Petit-Fort, he decided to attack Tortuga island (Île de la Tortue). The most difficult problem he had in this attack was how to reach this island without ships. He made up for this lack by building a raft consisting merely of planks held together by lianas.

On the night of February 18, 1803, 150 soldiers under the command of Vincent Louis were huddled together on this frail means of transportation in tow of 2 rowboats. They fell unexpectedly on the garrison of Tortuga and, for a while, seemed to be the conquerors. But the French, who soon got over their surprise, rallied and defeated Vincent Louis, who succeeded in making his escape with some of his companions.

The failure did not discourage the energy of Capois. On April 12, 1803, Capois stormed Port-de-Paix, and soon after, Vincent Louis on his raft was again on his way to Tortuga. He succeeded this time in taking possession of the island, which the French never recovered.

=== Battle of Vertières ===
On November 18, 1803, Jean-Jacques Dessalines had ordered Capois to capture Vertières, a fort situated upon a mount, from the French. He advanced with his half-brigade which, horribly mutilated, soon recoiled before the cannon fire coming from the fort. He led it back for a second time, but was again driven to the bottom of the hill by French fire.

Capois ran to seek other rebel units to command and, mounting his horse, advanced for the third time; again the heavy French fire from the fortress repulsed him and his forces. Now for the fourth time, he asked his men to follow him by shouting "Forward! Forward!". While he was at the head of his men, his horse was hit by a cannonball; he fell, but Capois took his sword, got up, and ran to place himself again at the head of his men by shouting "Forward! Forward!". His cap, garnished with hackles, was blasted away by French shot. He responded by drawing his sword and again throwing himself into the assault.

Observing this, Rochambeau and his men shouted: "Bravo! Bravo! Bravo!". The firing in the fort ceased. Suddenly, the battle was still. A French staff officer mounted his horse and rode toward Capois and shouted: "The captain-general sends compliments to the general who has just covered himself with such glory!". Then he saluted the rebels, returned to his position and the fighting resumed.

The next morning, a French officer followed by his companions led to the headquarters of the rebel army a horse caparisoned, and delivered him with these words: "The captain-general offers this horse as a mark of admiration to the black Achilles to replace the one of his that the French army regrets having killed".

== Death ==
On October 8, 1806, Capois was on his way to Cap-Haïtien, near Limonade, he rode into a trap set for him, and was killed by assassins on the orders of Henri Christophe.

== See also ==
- Jacques Maurepas
- Toussaint Louverture
- Battle of Vertières
- History of Haiti
