= Montagnes Noires, Haiti =

Mountain range of Haiti

Montagnes Noires
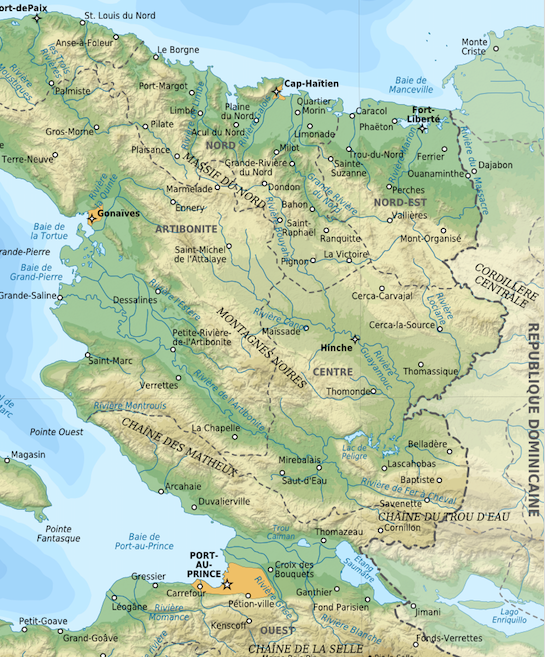

Naming
- English translation: Black Mountains

Geography
- Range coordinates: 19°08′13″N 72°21′22″W

The Montagnes Noires (French pronunciation: [mɔ̃taɲ nwaʁ], "Black Mountains") are a range of mountains in central Haiti.
