= Siege of Port-au-Prince (1803) =

- Part of the Haitian Revolution
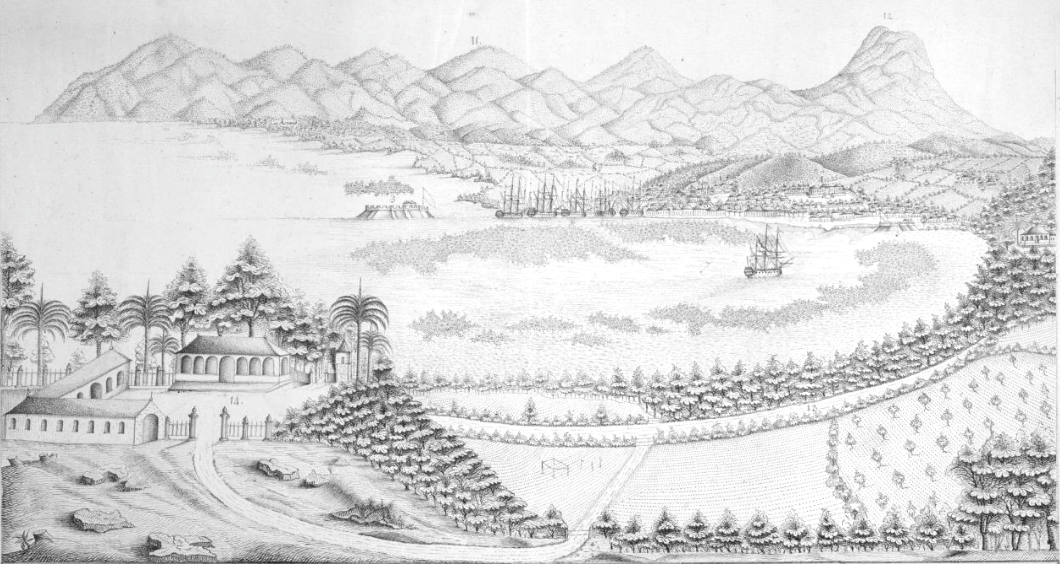
- Port-au-Prince in 1800
Date	October – November 1803
Location	Port-au-Prince, Saint-Domingue
Result	Rebel victory

Belligerents
Indigenous Army	France

Commanders and leaders
Jean-Jacques Dessalines	Jean-Pierre Marie Lavalette du Verdier

Strength
22,000	1,000

Casualties and losses
Unknown	Unknown

The siege of Port-au-Prince was an engagement that took place from October to November 1803 during the Haitian Revolution.

== Siege ==
In October, 22,000 men of the rebel Indigenous Army under General Jean-Jacques Dessalines laid siege to the city of Port-au-Prince. After a month of siege and several attacks, the defending French garrison under Jean-Pierre Marie Lavalette du Verdier evacuated the city and retreated to Cap-Français.

== Bibliography ==
- Forsdick, Charles; Høgsbjerg, Christian (2017). Toussaint Louverture: A Black Jacobin in the Age of Revolutions. London: Pluto Press. ISBN 978-0-7453-3515-5.
- Schœlcher, Victor (1982) [1889]. Vie de Toussaint Louverture (in French). Éditions Karthala.
