= Boisrond-Tonnerre =

Haitian writer and historian (1776–1806)

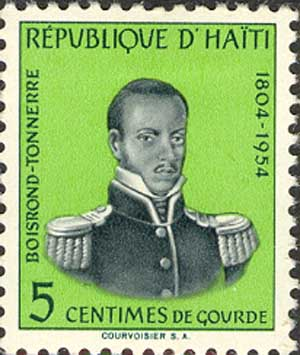
Louis Boisrond Tonnerre on a Haitian postage stamp for the 150-year anniversary of the Haitian Revolution, (1804-1954).

Louis Félix Mathurin Boisrond-Tonnerre (6 June 1776 – 24 October 1806), better known as simply Boisrond-Tonnerre, was a Haitian writer and historian who is best known for having served as Jean-Jacques Dessalines' secretary. Boisrond-Tonnerre was educated in Paris until 1798 when he returned to Haiti (Daut 56). He is the author of the 1804 Haitian Declaration of Independence, which formally declared Haiti's independence from the colonial rule of France. He is also known for his work chronicling the Haitian Revolution, Mémoires pour Servir à l'Histoire d'Haïti.

Boisrond-Tonnerre was born Louis Boisrond in Torbeck in southwest Haiti. He acquired the name "Tonnerre" (French for "thunder") as an infant, when his cradle was hit by lightning. His father, a carpenter named Mathurin Boisrond (see Daut below), amazed that his infant son was unharmed, gave him the name "Tonnerre". Boisrond-Tonnerre studied in France before returning to Haiti, where he took part in the Haitian Revolution.

Boisrond-Tonnerre became a victim of post-revolutionary infighting and was executed in October 1806. According to the Haitian author Christophe Phillippe Charles, Boisrond-Tonnerre scribbled the following quatrain on the walls of his cell before his execution on either the night of 23 or 24 October 1806:

Humide et froid séjour fait par et pour le crime
Où le crime en riant immole sa victime
Que peuvent inspirer tes fers et tes barreaux
Quand un cœur pur y goûte un innocent repos? (Christophe 35).

Translation :

Cold and humid internment crime has both fashioned and formed
Where crime, laughing, immolates and consumes its servant
But what [fear] can your iron bars hope to inspire
When a pure heart wrests from them a peaceful rest? (Christophe 35)

Dessalines had been assassinated seven or eight days prior on 17 October in Port-au-Prince.

Boisrond-Tonnere's personal narrative of the Haitian revolution was published posthumously: Mémoires pour servir à l'histoire d'Haiti précédés de différents actes politiques dus à sa plume et d'une étude historique et critique par Saint-Remy [Memoirs to serve the history of Haiti preceded by various political acts due to his pen with a historical and critical study by Saint-Remy] (Paris, 1851).
