= Magloire Ambroise =

- Born: 1774; Jacmel, Saint-Domingue
- Died: December 7, 1807 (aged 32–33); Port-au-Prince, Haiti
- Military career
- Allegiance: Haitian Revolution
- Rank: General
- Conflicts: Haitian Revolution

Magloire Ambroise (1774 in Jacmel, Saint-Domingue – December 7, 1807 in Port-au-Prince) was a hero of the Haitian Independence. His military career began in the colonial army.

== Life ==
During the War of Knives between Toussaint Louverture in the North against the mulattoes leader André Rigaud in the South (1799–1801), Magloire saved the lives of hundred of respected families in Jacmel. As a result, he was regarded as a hero by the people of that town at this time. In 1802, Jean-Jacques Dessalines named him commander of Jacmel. However, the French troops captured the town as they did in many towns in the country at that time. In 1803, Magloire Ambroise put a siege in Jacmel. The siege was over on October 17, 1803, when the French troops surrendered and were allowed by Magloire's troops to board a British warship.

In 1804, Magloire Ambroise was one of the generals who signed the independence act. In February 1806, by the order of Dessalines, Magloire Ambroise received Francisco de Miranda (a South American leader who fought to liberate Latin America from Spanish rule) and gave Miranda munitions and men to fight the Spaniards. the following month, March 12, 1806, the Venezuelan flag was born in the harbor of Jacmel. In Venezuela, this day is celebrated as flag's day. Notice also the Venezuelan flag has red and blue which symbolizes their friendship with Haiti.

In 1807, Magloire Ambroise became president of the senate and his troops even named him president of the republic. however, he didn't accept this offer. He was arrested by general Bonnet under the order of Alexandre Pétion. he died in prison on December 7, 1807. some sources say he committed suicide while other claim Pétion killed him in prison. In fact, after his death Pétion became the new head of the senate and later became president of the Republic.
