= Jacques Maurepas =

Haitian military officer politician

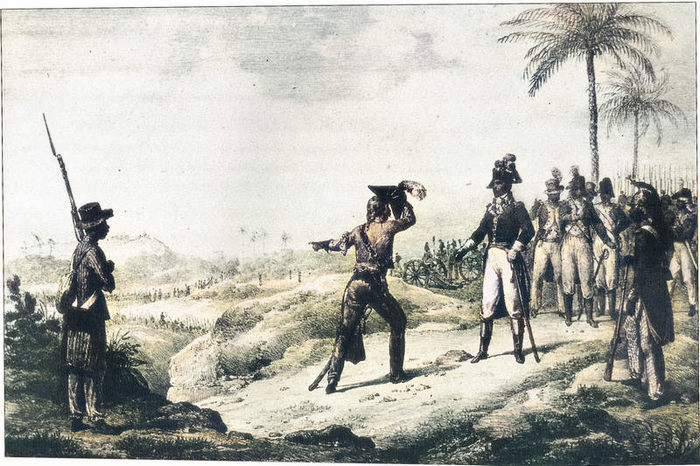
Surrender of Maurepas

Jacques Maurepas (died 17 November 1802) was the commander of the town of Port-de-Paix in the northeast of St. Domingue which is now Haiti at the time when Napoleon sent a large army led by his brother-in-law general Charles Leclerc to overthrow Toussaint Louverture.

Before the arrival of Leclerc, Louverture had ordered Maurepas to make the most vigorous resistance to all vessels which should appear before Port-de-Paix, and, in case he was not strong enough (having only half of a brigade), burn the city to the ground and afterward withdraw to the mountain, take with him ammunition of all kinds; there to defend himself to the death. On February 12, 1802, suspecting the French expedition was about to land in the city, Maurepas burned the city down and retreated to a nearby mountain named Les Trois Pavillons. When French General Humbert arrived, he saw the city in flames. On February 13, Humbert marched against Maurepas, but was completely defeated. When Charles Leclerc heard this terrible news, he sent by sea General Debelle against Maurepas, who defeated Debelle's army. However, Maurepas, instead of continuing to fight, surrendered to the French.

General Leclerc integrated him in the French army as he had promised and placed him under the authority of a general named Brunett who was in command of Port-de-Paix. After being suspected of taking part in a revolt led by Colonel François Capois (Capois-la-Mort), he, his family, and some of the soldiers were arrested by Brunett and brought to Cap-Français (now Cap-Haïtien). On 17 November Donatien de Rochambeau arrived at Cap-Français, and by his order Maurepas and his family were brought onboard a ship and tortured, with some being hung; Maurepas was drowned by being thrown into the sea.

== See also ==
- François Capois
- Toussaint Louverture
- Haitian Revolution

== Related articles ==
- History of Haiti
- Saint-Domingue
- Saint-Domingue expedition
