= Saint-Domingue expedition =

French military expedition

- Part of the Haitian Revolution
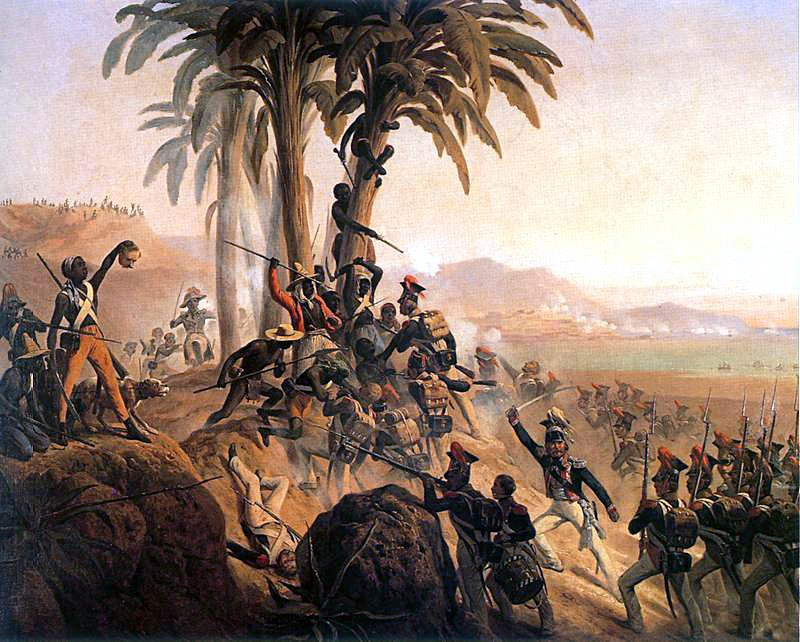
- Battle between troops of the Indigenous Army and Polish troops sent by Napoleon in 1802
Date	December 1801 – December 1803
Location	Saint-Domingue (later Haiti)
Result	Rebel victory
Territorial changes	Establishment of the First Empire of Haiti

Belligerents
France: Polish Legions	Indigenous Army; United Kingdom

Commanders and leaders
Charles Leclerc # Donatien de Rochambeau (surrendered); Jean Boudet; Louis de Joyeuse; Louis René de Tréville; Federico Gravina	Toussaint Louverture (surrendered); Henri Christophe; Jean-Jacques Dessalines; John Duckworth

Strength
31,000	22,000

Casualties and losses
35,000–40,000	80,000

The Saint-Domingue expedition was a large French military invasion sent by Napoleon Bonaparte, then First Consul, under his brother-in-law Charles Victor Emmanuel Leclerc in an attempt to regain French control of the Caribbean colony of Saint-Domingue on the island of Hispaniola, and curtail the measures of independence and abolition of slaves taken by the former slave Toussaint Louverture. It departed in December 1801 and, after initial success, ended in a French defeat at the Battle of Vertières and the departure of French troops in December 1803. The defeat ended Napoleon's goal of a French empire in the West.

== Context ==
The French Revolution led to serious social upheavals on Saint-Domingue, of which the most important was the slave revolt that led to the abolition of slavery in 1793 by the civil commissioners Sonthonax and Polverel, in a decision endorsed and spread to all the French colonies by the National Convention 6 months later, including Haiti on August 29, 1793. Toussaint Louverture, a black former slave who had been recognized as Governor by France, re-established peace, fought off Spanish and British attempts to capture the island, and partially re-established prosperity by daring measures. However, he went too far in hunting down governor Don Joaquín García y Moreno (27 January 1801), who had remained in what had been the Spanish part of the island following the 1795 Peace of Basel. Toussaint had also challenged French imperial interests by promulgating a self-rule constitution on 12 July 1801, which declared himself governor for life.

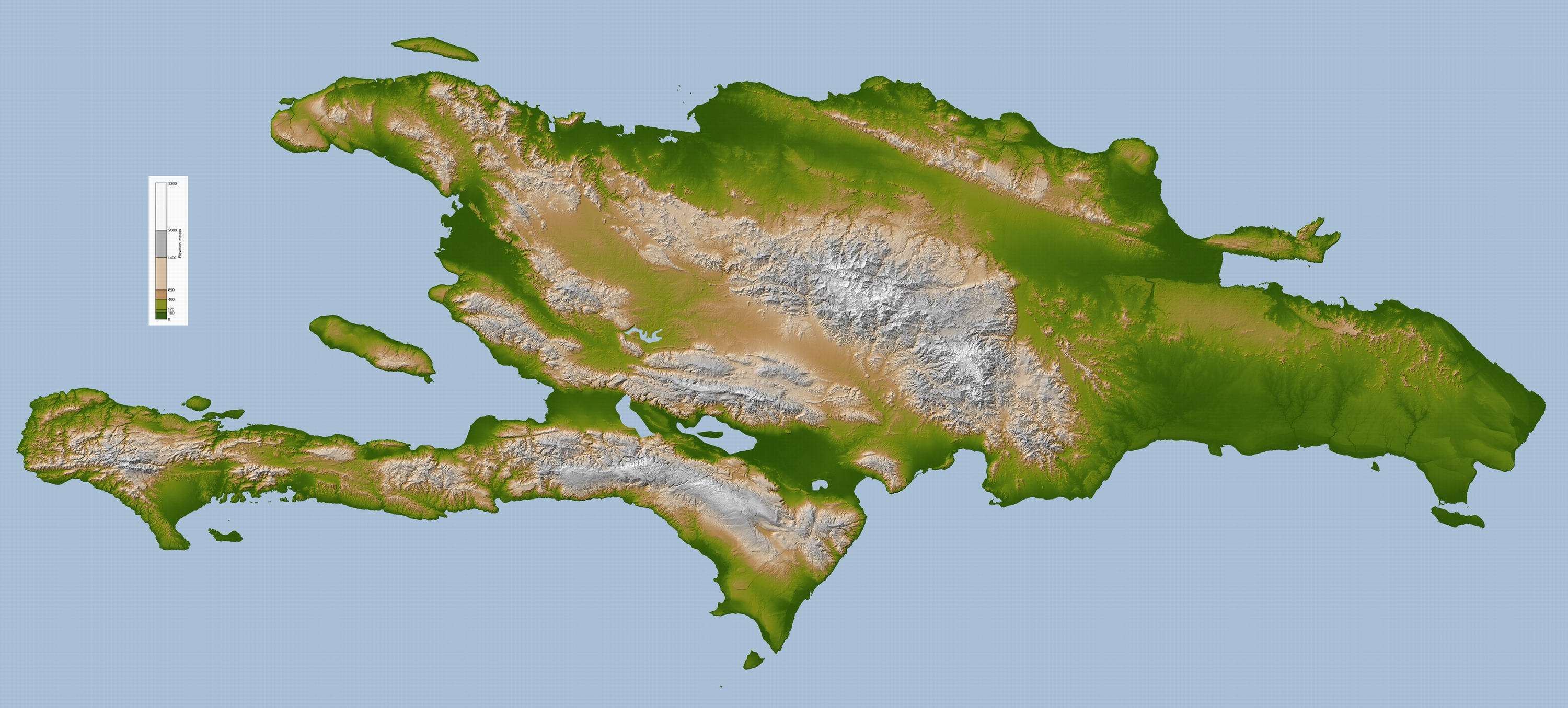
The isle of Hispaniola

On 9 February 1801, after their defeat at Marengo, the Austrians split off from the Second Coalition and signed the Treaty of Lunéville with France. The Kingdom of Naples then signed a peace treaty with the French at Florence and Russia under Paul I distanced itself from the coalition, with his successor Alexander I finally concluding a secret peace with Bonaparte on 10 October 1801. Britain was thus isolated and, after the first ministry of William Pitt the Younger fell on 13 March 1801, the new Addington ministry began to consider making peace.

Napoleon (now First Consul) could thus concentrate on internal problems within France and its empire. His troops were idle and his officers eager for a chance for glory. In early 1801, Napoleon decided to appoint his sister Pauline's husband, general Charles Leclerc, as head of a military expedition to reassert French authority over Saint-Domingue. Initially, Napoleon planned to confirm the military ranks and lands acquired by Toussaint's officers, offer Toussaint the rôle of lieutenant of France, and guarantee freedom to the former slaves, while re-establishing Paris's authority over the island in the person of its capitaine général. Toussaint's two sons were then being educated in France and as proof to Toussaint of the French government's goodwill Napoleon sent them back to their father with their tutor. By October, however, Napoleon's opinion had shifted, as he interpreted Toussaint's July constitution as an unacceptable offense to French imperial authority. Henceforth, Napoleon secretly directed Leclerc to disarm Toussaint's black-controlled government and deport his military officers to France.

Napoleon foresaw that Toussaint would probably put up resistance and so took all necessary measures to defeat him should that occur – Toussaint had over 16,000 men available, so Leclerc was put in command of 30,000 men drawn from nearly all units of the French Revolutionary Army as well as the disciplinary corps.

== Expedition ==
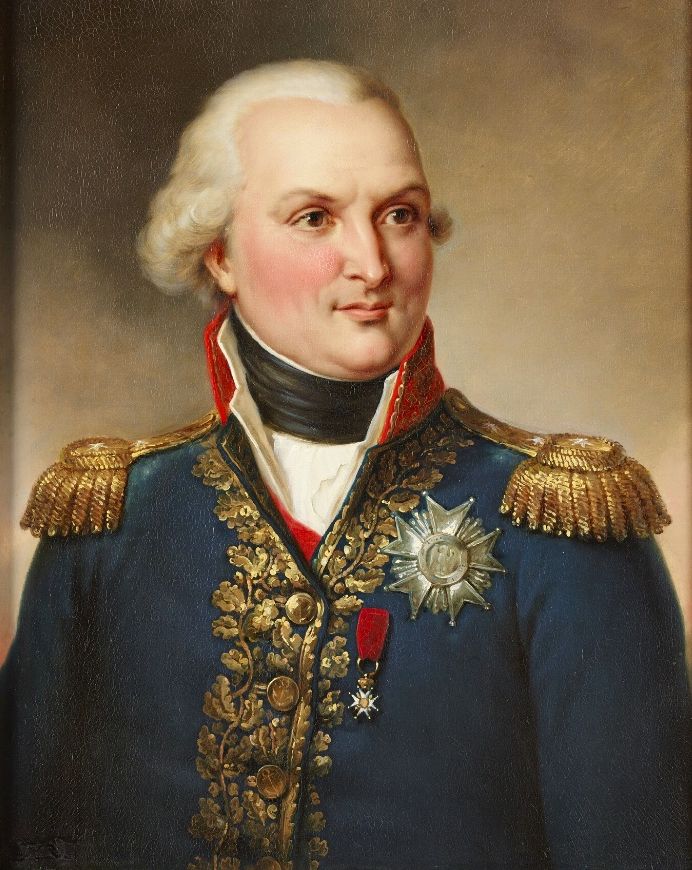
Admiral Villaret de Joyeuse

Peace had not yet been conclusively signed with Britain (the Peace of Amiens would finally be signed on 25 March 1802) when on 14 December 1801 a French fleet of 21 frigates and 35 ships of the line (with one 120 gun ship) left Brest under Villaret de Joyeuse carrying 7,000–8,000 troops. This fleet was followed by the squadron under contre-amiral Ganteaume which left Toulon on 14 February with 4,200 troops then by that under contre-amiral Linois which left Cádiz on 17 February with 2,400 troops. In the following months even more ships left France with fresh troops, including over 4,000 troops of the French Imperial Naval Corps, a Dutch division and the 3rd Polish Half-Brigade. Also included were a Spanish fleet of seven ships under Admiral Federico Gravina as well as a great deal of financial and material aid coming from Spanish Cuba. In total 31,131 troops were landed on Saint-Domingue, including Mulatto officers such as André Rigaud and future Haitian president Alexandre Pétion, both of whom Toussaint had expelled from the colony two years earlier in the War of Knives (after the Saint-Domingue expedition's failure, Rigaud would be imprisoned at the Fort de Joux by Napoleon, a few cells away from Toussaint himself).

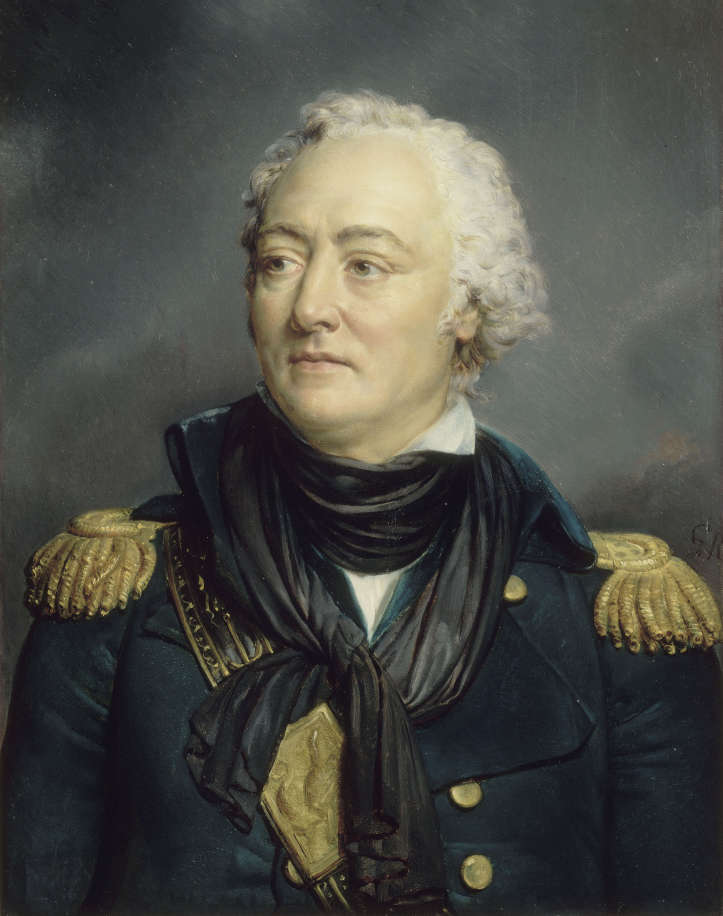
Admiral Louis-René Levassor de Latouche-Tréville

The ships were due to join up in the Bay of Samaná, which Villaret de Joyeuse reached on 29 January, closely followed by Latouche-Tréville. Without waiting for Ganteaume and Linois, these two admirals divided up their combined fleets to arrive at different ports in order to surprise Toussaint. General Kerverseau was to land at Santo Domingo in the Spanish part of the island, General Jean Boudet was sent to take Port-au-Prince in ships under Latouche-Tréville and Leclerc; Villaret de Joyeuse and Gravina sailed towards to Cap-Haïtien. When Toussaint discovered the French ships in the Bay of Samaná he ordered Henri Christophe (head of the island's northern département), Jean-Jacques Dessalines (head of the western département) and Laplume (head of the southern département) to obey the squadrons' summons to a parley, to insist on a parley if none was offered, and (if a landing should occur) to threaten to destroy the towns and massacre the white inhabitants before retreating into the mountains.

== Recoccupation ==
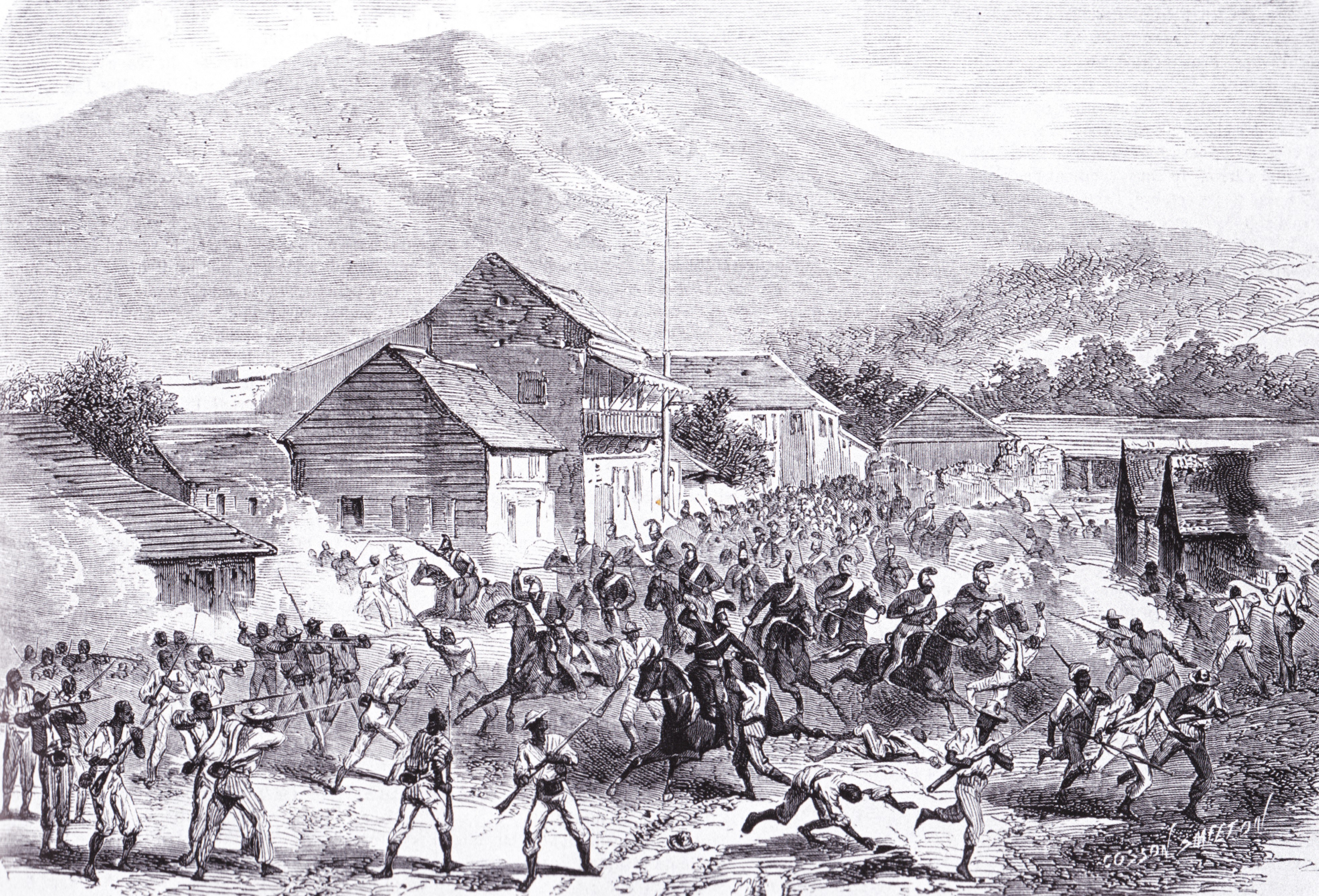
French dragoons attacking Black rebels during the expedition

Villaret arrived before Cap-Haïtien on 3 February and an attack by land and sea began on 5 February. Christophe carried out his orders, setting light to the town and slitting the throats of part of the white population. On 6 February, Donatien de Rochambeau landed in the bay of Mancenille and captured Fort-Dauphin. Putting out the fires and putting up defensive works, Leclerc set up his main headquarters at Cap-Haïtien before sending ships towards North America to resupply. During this time Latouche-Tréville and Boudet took Port-au-Prince and Léogâne and obtained Laplume's surrender. Landing at Santo Domingo with 2,000 men, General Kerverseau took possession of a large part of the Spanish area of the island, then headed by Toussaint's brother Paul Louverture.

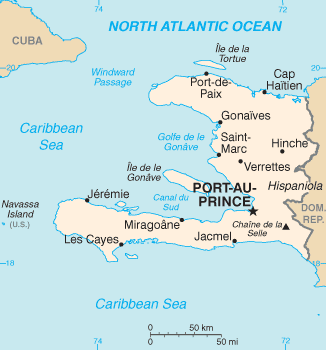
The French part of the island

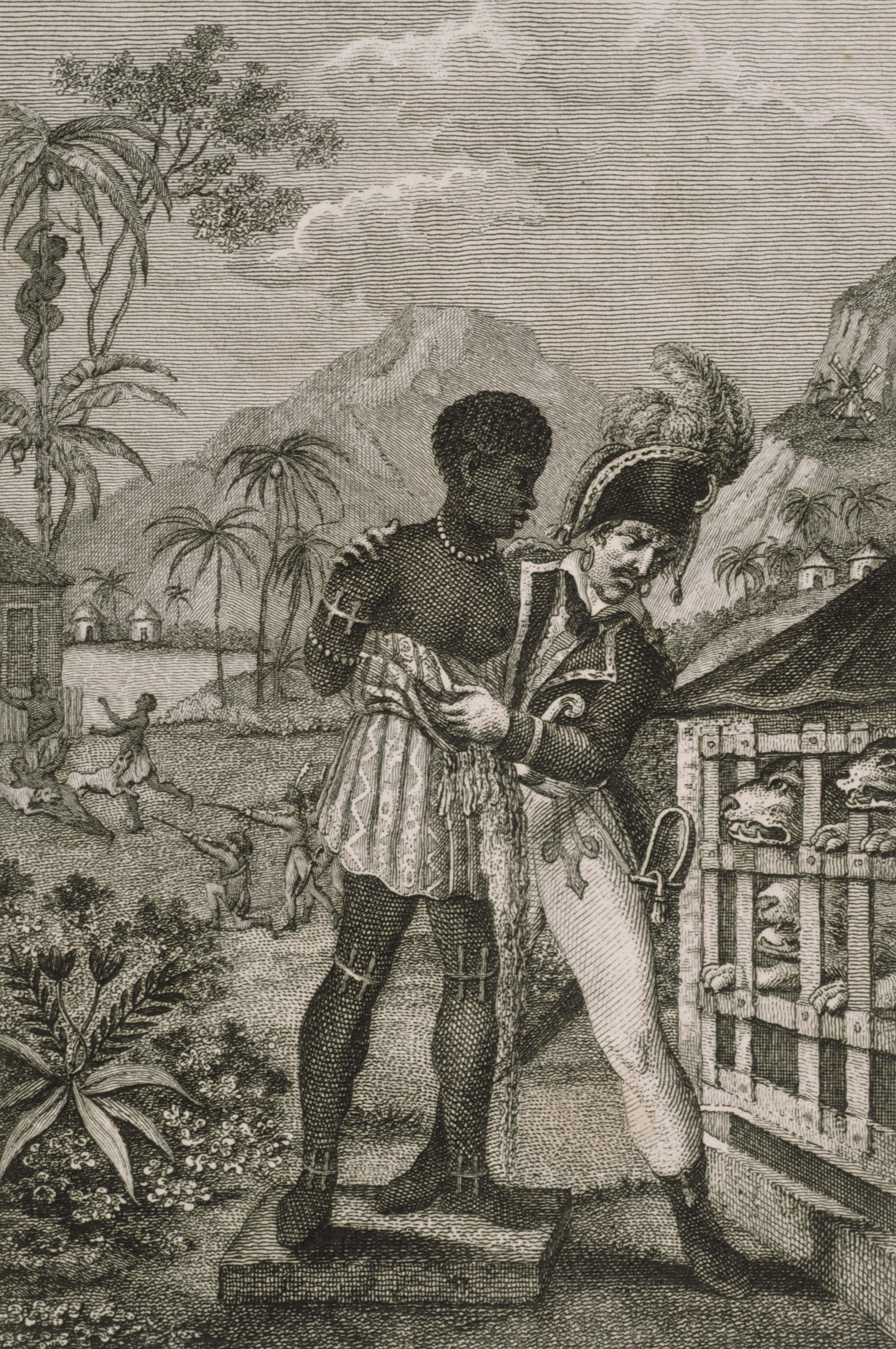
A French officer feeding a Black woman to a Dogo Cubano

In the first ten days the French occupied the island's ports, towns and a large part of the cultivated land. Taking refuge in the Arbonite massif, Toussaint was only left with a few brigades under generals Jacques Maurepas, Christophe and Dessalines. However, he also had a large number of white hostages. To dislodge him the French would have to overcome narrow gorges, impenetrable with thick tropical vegetation and ideal for ambushes. The squadrons under Ganteaume and Linois had arrived, however, with reinforcements and Leclerc still held his joker in the form of his own hostages, Toussaint's sons, both of whom carried a letter from Napoleon promising their father the role of Leclerc's deputy in command of the island if he surrendered.

On 17 February Leclerc launched a simultaneous assault with the divisions he had formed. Rochambeau on the left set out from Fort-Dauphin towards Saint-Michel, whilst Hardy marched on Marmelade and Desfourneaux on Plaisance. At the same time General Humbert was to land at Port-de-Paix to climb up Les Trois Rivières gorge, and Boudet move up from south to north. The aim was to surprise the enemy, force him to retreat to Gonaïves and there encircle him. Despite the difficulties of the terrain and Maurepas's resistance, the plan worked well.

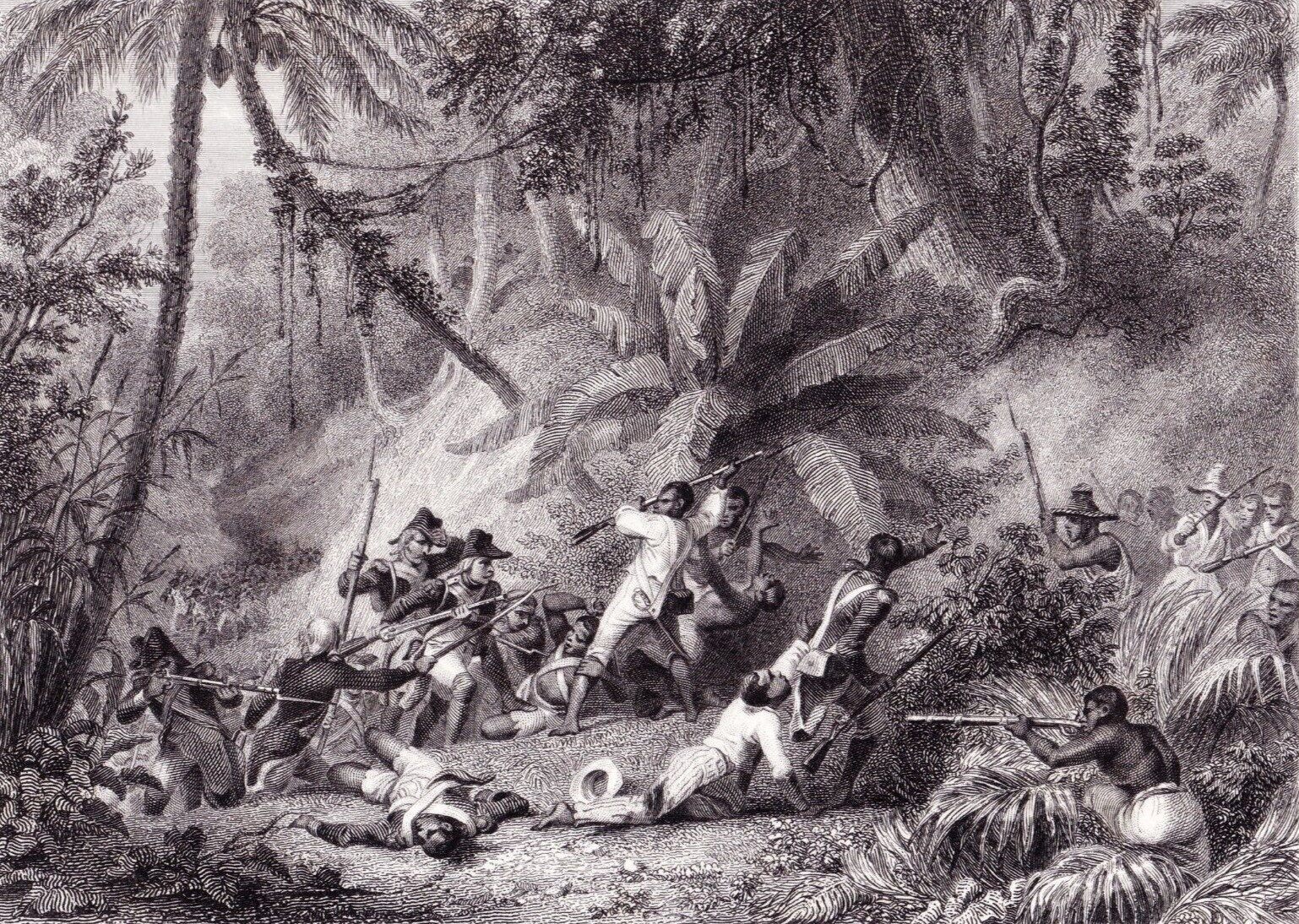
Capture of Ravine-à-Couleuvres (February 23, 1802)

On 23 February Desfourneaux's division entered Gonaïves, then on fire. General Boudet occupied Saint-Marc, also on fire, and filled with the blood of the throats cut on the orders of Dessalines, who managed to escape the trap. Maurepas and his 2,000 troops continued to resist but finally had to surrender to Humbert. The French forces besieging fort de la Crête-à-Pierrot were attacked in the rear by Dessalines, then by Toussaint, as they attempted to bring relief to the besieged, but the fort was finally forced to surrender and inside it were found large amounts of arms and munitions as well as many assassinated white residents. At Verrettes the French forces found a horrible spectacle. No longer able to follow the rebel forces' march, 800 men, women, children and old people had been killed, and the rebels there had also killed any prisoners they took.

Running out of resources, the area controlled by the rebel forces became more and more restricted and the rebels more and more disheartened. Christophe offered to lay down his arms in exchange for being given the same lenient treatment as had been given Laplume and Maurepas and his surrender led to that of Dessalines and finally of Toussaint. From house arrest, Toussaint was restored to his rank and properties by Leclerc. At the end of April and start of May order was re-established little by little on the island, trade resumed at the ports, and the rebels (seemingly reconciled to their situation) held onto their lands and ranks.

Layout of the expedition

== French defeat ==
In retirement under house arrest at Ennery, Toussaint contemplated his revenge and saw the French forces (especially those who had only just arrived on the island) ravaged by his best ally, yellow fever, with around 15,000 dead in only two months. Toussaint continued corresponding with his leaders, encouraging them to be ever ready, although some of them did not want to restart the war, and warned Leclerc. Sensing danger, in June Leclerc called Toussaint to an interview, arrested him, put him on a ship and sent him to Europe, where he was held at the Fort de Joux. Martinique was returned to France by the Treaty of Amiens and the Law of 20 May 1802 confirmed that slavery would be continued there. News of the reestablishment of slavery on Guadeloupe reached Saint-Domingue and revolt threatened again. Leclerc judged it wisest to disarm the blacks, but this just made them more angry. At Basse-Terre on Guadeloupe, yellow fever had also broken out and on 3 September Richepanse died of it, to be replaced by Boudet. Rochambeau, who hated mulattoes more than blacks, succeeded to Boudet's post on Saint-Domingue. Toussaint's old enemy and rival Rigaud was ordered to embark for the United States of America. In the south of the island, where mulattoes were most numerous, they were equally offended and allied themselves with the blacks. The wind of revolt, blowing especially through the north, was also spreading in the south.

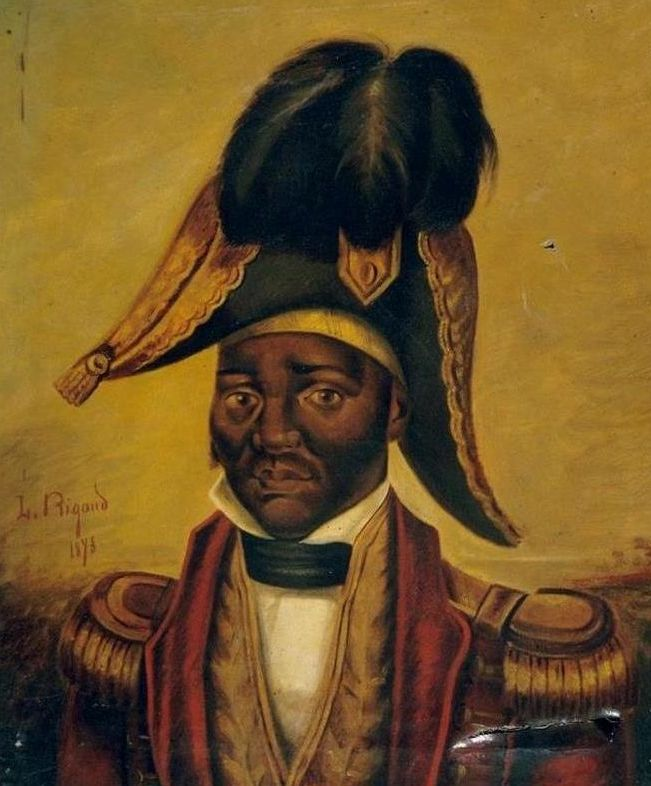
Jean-Jacques Dessalines

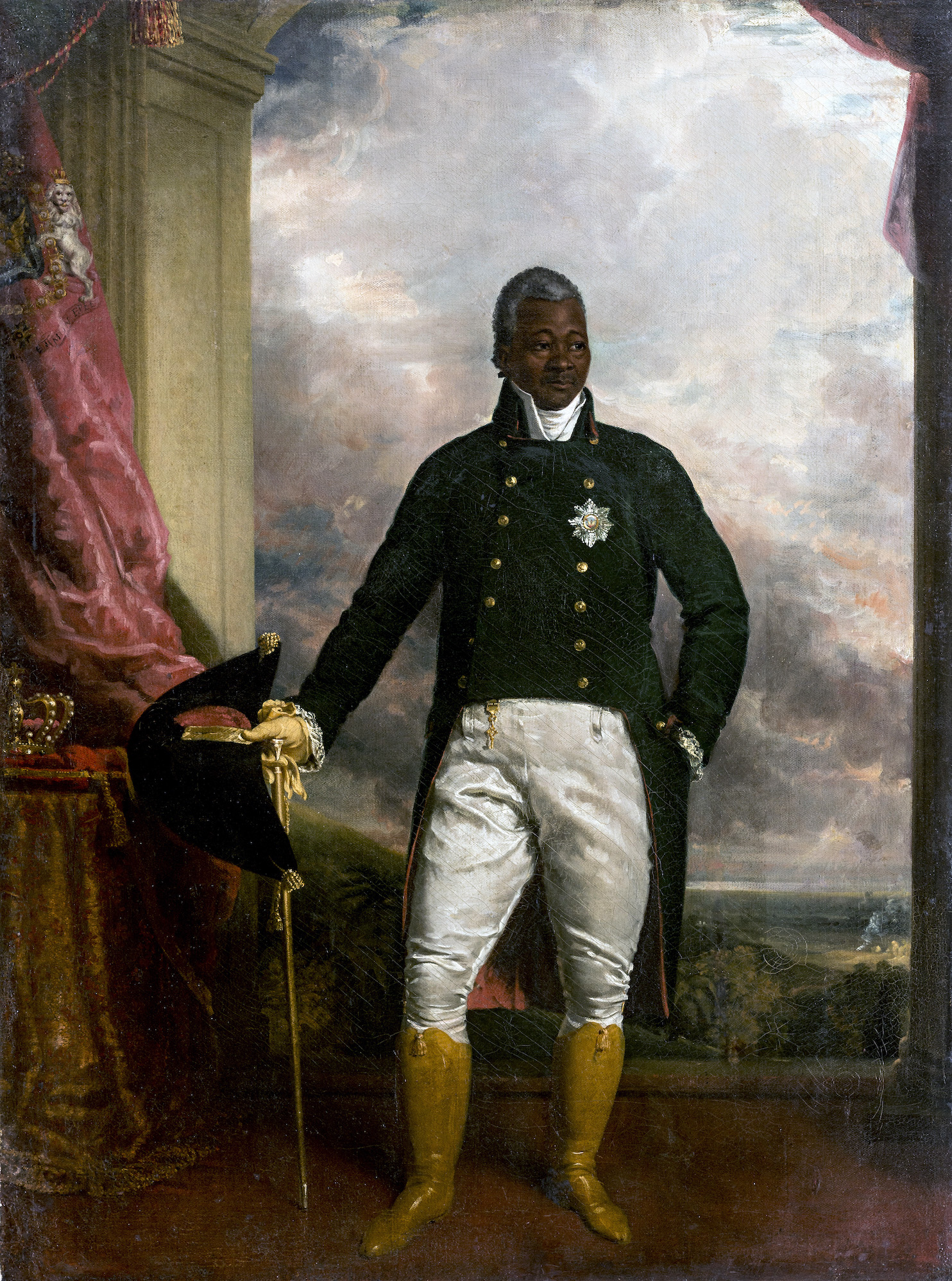
Henri Christophe

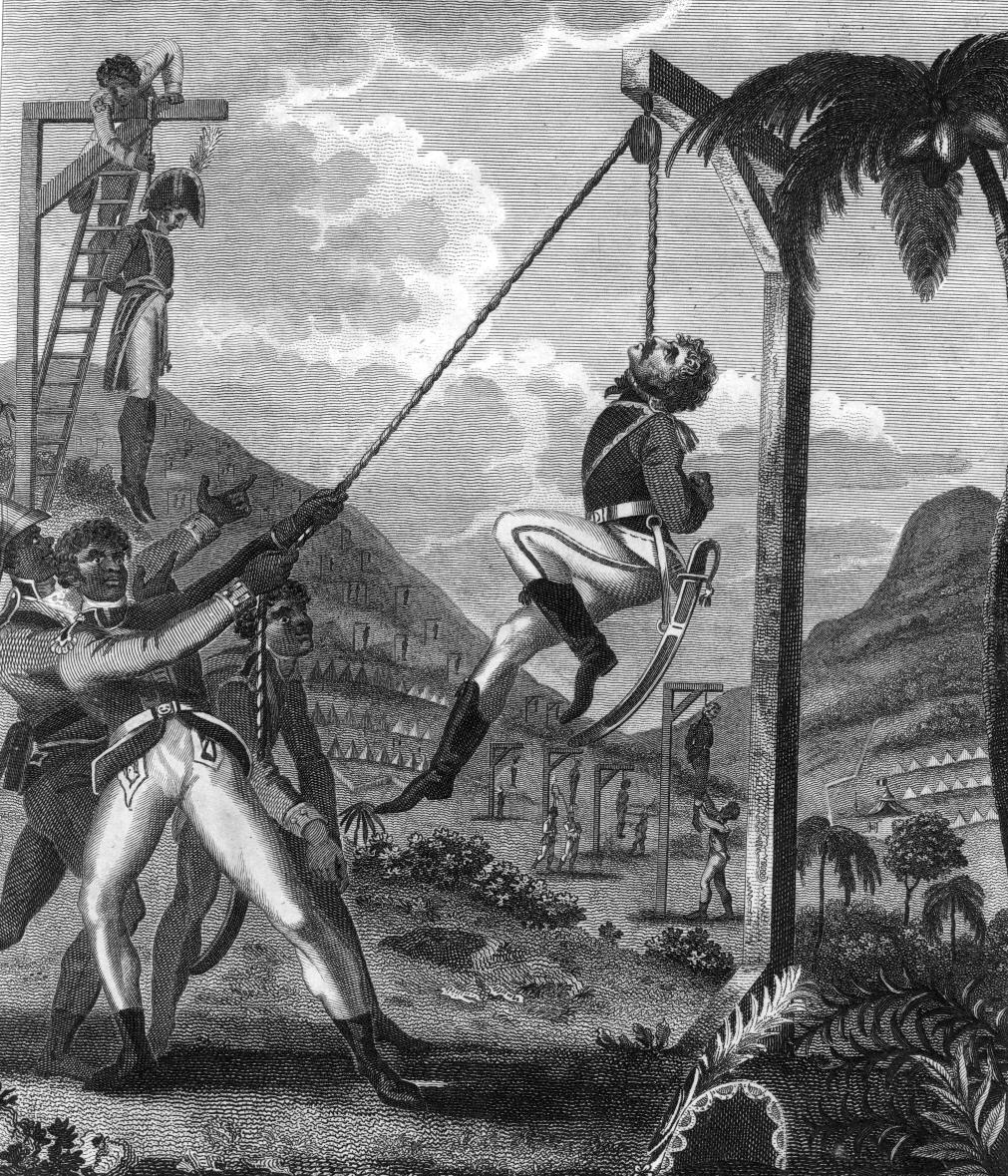
Black troops hanging French prisoners

By August 1802, Leclerc's forces had begun to suffer from mass defections of black and mulatto troops. In October, the former rebel leaders Alexander Petion, Henri Christophe and Jean-Jacques Dessalines all deserted the French forces as well. The French forces, now numbering only 8,000 to 10,000 men and only just able to serve, were overwhelmed. After the recently defected Christophe massacred several hundred Polish soldiers at Port-de-Paix, Leclerc ordered the arrest of all remaining black colonial troops in Cap-Haïtien, and executed 1000 of them by tying sacks of flour to their neck and pushing them off the side of ships. The French subsequently sent orders to arrest and imprison all the black troops in the colony still serving within the French forces. This included still-loyal officers such as Maurepas, who was drowned with his family in the harbor of Cap-Haïtien on Leclerc's orders in early November.

Taking refuge on Tortuga in an attempt to avoid yellow fever, Leclerc died of it on 1 November 1802. His wife Pauline Bonaparte had accompanied her husband to the island and, though she had not previously been a model of fidelity, his death threw her into despair – she cut off her hair, put it in her husband's coffin, put his heart in an urn and had the rest of his remains repatriated to France.

As the senior officer on the expedition, Rochambeau took over from Leclerc as supreme commander and tried in vain to suppress the new revolt. Rochambeau received a shipment of slave-hunting dogs from Cuba. They were a military disappointment, requiring forceful prodding to eat a tied up black man. In Haiti, French use of man-eating dogs still resounds as colonial rule viciousness.

Cap-Haïtien seemed to be the last bastion of the anti-rebel forces and, when the rebels reached it, Christophe had already relieved one of the forts. Rochambeau recaptured it but at the height of the battle some 1,200 blacks being held prisoner on a ship in the bay threw its crew overboard. On 18 November 1803, near the Cap, the French were defeated at the Battle of Vertières by the rebel general Jean-Jacques Dessalines and at the end of December the last French soldiers left the island. On their voyage back to France, Rochambeau was captured at the Blockade of Saint-Domingue by the British and then interned in Britain for nearly nine years as a prisoner of war.

== Aftermath ==
1804 cartoon of British officers purportedly preventing rebels from executing French officers (right)

The expedition resulted with France losing more troops in Saint-Domingue than during the later Battle of Waterloo. Little more than 7,000 to 8,000 of the 31,000 soldiers sent to Saint-Domingue survived and over 20 French generals died. On 1 January 1804 Dessalines proclaimed the colony of Saint-Domingue to be the second independent state in the Americas, under the name of Haiti, and was first made governor general for life before (on 6 October 1804) being crowned emperor as Jacques I. Over 3,000 whites, including women and children, were killed under his supervision in the 1804 Haiti Massacre. He followed a system of "caporalisme agraire" or serfdom that did not include slavery per se but was still aimed at maintaining sugar industry profits by force. Dessalines was assassinated on 17 October 1806 and the country split into a kingdom in the north under Christophe as Henri I and a republic in the south under Alexandre Pétion. With their defeat in the Peninsular War, the French would lose the eastern part of Hispaniola to Spain in 1814. In 1825 Charles X of France began the Haiti indemnity controversy when he demanded of 150 million gold francs from the young republic in return for France recognising its independence. This debt to France was reduced to 90 million in 1838 and was finally paid off in 1947.

== See also ==
- Devastations of Osorio
- Reconquista (Santo Domingo), 1808–1809

== Bibliography ==
- (in French) Histoire de l'expédition des Français à Saint-Domingue sous le consulat de Napoléon Bonaparte, Isaac Toussaint Louverture, 1825
- (in French) Mémoires du général Toussaint L'Ouverture, écrits par lui-même ... précédés d'une étude... , Toussaint Louverture, Joseph Saint-Rémy, 1853
- (in French) Histoire du consulat et de l'empire, faisant suite à l'Histoire de la révolution française, Adolphe Thiers, 1845
- Ferrer, Ada (2014). Freedom's Mirror. Cambridge University Press. ISBN 9781107029422.
- C.L.R. James, The Black Jacobins : Toussaint L'Ouverture and the San Domingo Revolution, 1st ed. 1938, 2nd ed. 1963
