= 1791 slave rebellion =

Slave rebellion

- Part of the Haitian Revolution
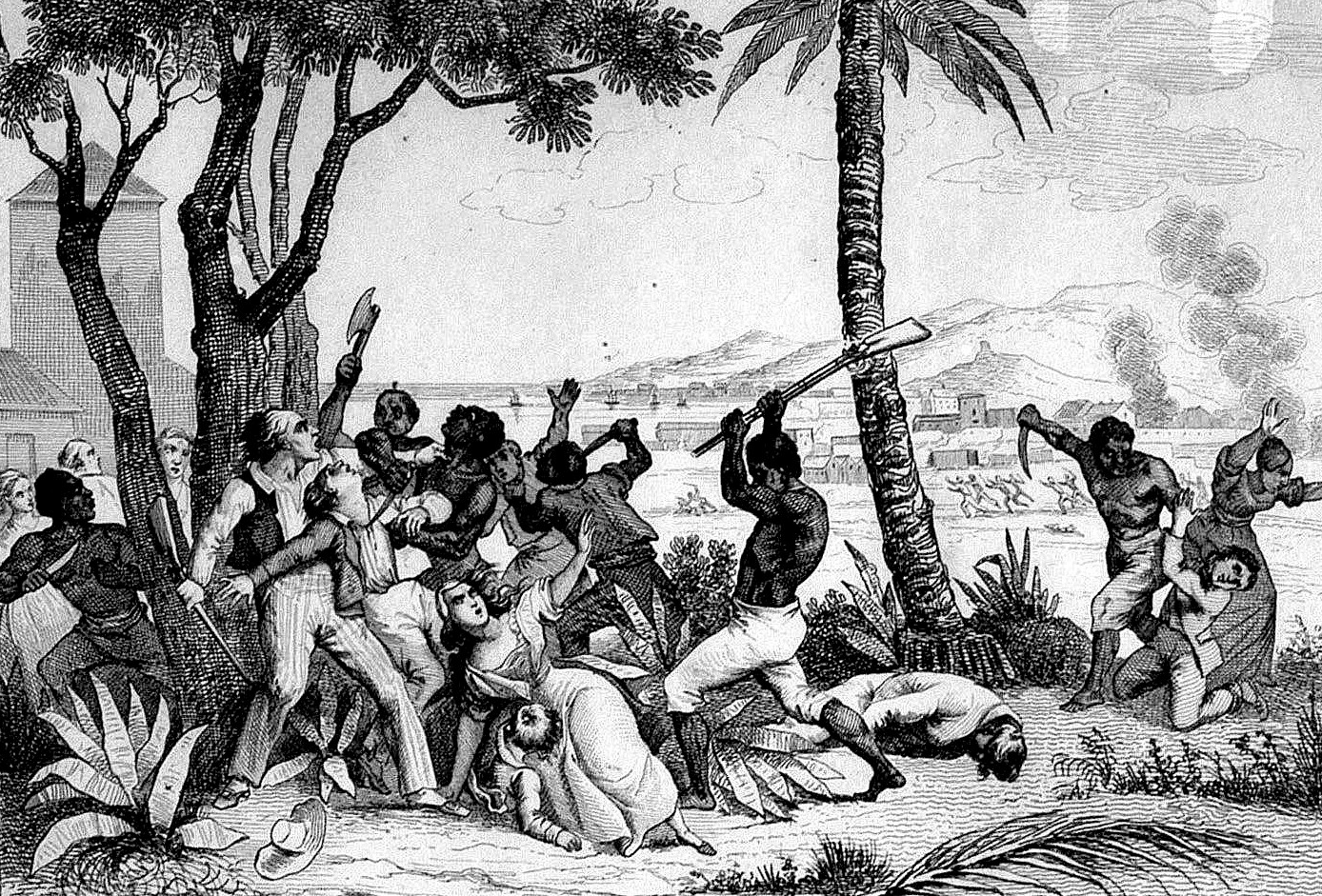
- Illustration of the rebellion
Date	21 August 1791
Location	Saint-Domingue
Result	Rebel slaves seize control of parts of northern Saint-Domingue.; Beginning of the Haitian Revolution.

Belligerents
Enslaved rebels	French colonial authorities White colonists

Commanders and leaders
Dutty Boukman; Jean-François Papillon; Jeannot; Georges Biassou; Toussaint Louverture	

Strength
Thousands	

The 1791 slave rebellion was a slave rebellion in the French colony of Saint-Domingue which sparked the Haitian Revolution. Unlike previous rebellions, French colonial authorities were unable to suppress it, and the rebellion eventually led to the abolition of slavery in the colony. The revolt was notable for being one of the only slave rebellions in history to succeed and for its prominence in the history of Haiti.

By the time of the rebellion, over half the population of Saint-Domingue was enslaved. The outbreak of the French Revolution and subsequent signing of the Declaration of the Rights of Man and of the Citizen, which were based upon the idea of liberty, equality, and fraternity for all men, sparked tension in the colony as abolitionists and enslaved people became more radical while the ruling class attempted to tighten its grip on power. The rebellion began in earnest on the night of 21 August 1791 and, following years of bloody fighting, ultimately led to the independence of Haiti in 1804.

== Background ==
For more than one thousand years, Arawak and Taino people inhabited what was later known as Hispaniola. Christopher Columbus arrived to the island on December 5, 1492. The Spanish began importing African slaves during the 16th century. In 1659 during the Atlantic slave trade, half of the Caribbean island of Hispaniola became the French colony Saint-Domingue. By the early 17th century, enslaved people made up over half the population of Saint-Domingue.

Early attempts were made by slaves in order to recover their freedom, among them can be named the uprising in Saint-Domingue made by Padrejean in 1676 and the uprising of François Mackandal in 1757.

Political unrest on Saint-Domingue began to rise after the French Revolution and the signing of the Declaration of the Rights of Man. After the Fall of the Bastille on July 14, 1789, white planters in the colony expelled the intendant, a military strongman sent by France to govern the colony. The colonists proceeded to reform the government by creating local and provincial legislative assemblies. In 1790, they created a Colonial Assembly that met at the town of St. Marc. A few Free Blacks participated in some local assemblies, but according to David Patrick Geggus, who wrote Haitian Revolutionary Studies, “by 1790 it was clear that the colonists were determined to maintain the status quo and keep nonwhites out of politics.”

The political marginalization of free Blacks led to an armed rebellion in late 1790 led by Vincent Ogé, a mulatto former merchant and activist descended from coffee planters, and Jean-Baptiste Chavannes, a soldier who had fought with France in the American Revolution. Ogé, a member of the Society of the Friends of the Blacks, traveled to Saint-Domingue at the behest of Maximilien Robespierre to lead the abolitionist insurrection. Ogé and Chavannes revolted in October 1790 in the North, where there were not many free Blacks. This limited the number of people they were able to recruit since Ogé refused to enlist slaves. With an army of 300, he was defeated and executed by being broken on a wheel. Ogé's brutal execution inspired a backlash in France, where on May 15, 1791, the National Assembly declared Blacks and Whites equal to avoid future revolts. Ogé's rebellion was the largest, but not the first instance of violence between former slaves and White planters; within two months isolated fighting broke out between the two groups.

The political situation in Saint-Domingue grew more violent and complicated during 1791. A forged royal decree emancipating all slaves circulated around the island and White backlash against the May 15 Declaration created a great deal of tension. After the Colonial Assembly announced that they were ignoring the declaration, many free Blacks formed militias in the West and South of the colony. Furthermore, there were three small-scale slave revolts in June and July 1791 on plantations near Port-au-Prince, all of which were suppressed.

== Declaration of the Rights of Man and of the Citizen ==
In 1789, the Declaration of the Rights of Man and of the Citizen (French: Déclaration des droits de l'homme et du citoyen de 1789) set by France's National Constituent Assembly in 1789, it is a human civil rights document from the French Revolution. Inspired by Enlightenment philosophers, the Declaration was a core statement of the values of the French Revolution and had a major impact on the development of popular conceptions of individual liberty and democracy in Europe and worldwide. The Declaration was originally drafted by the Marquis de Lafayette, in consultation with Thomas Jefferson. Influenced by the doctrine of "natural right", the rights of man are held to be universal: valid at all times and in every place. It became the basis for a nation of free individuals protected equally by the law.

The Declaration sparked tension and debate in France and Saint-Domingue alike regarding the colony's enslaved population. French colonists feared the Declaration's assertion that "Men are born and remain free and equal in rights" would give rise to a movement of people of color demanding the rights they had been denied, while others feared this signaled France's intent to abolish slavery in its overseas colonies. In order prevent the colony from declaring independence, the National Assembly specified that the Declaration of Rights was not intended to apply to the colonies, placating the White elite but adding to the discontent of the abolitionist movement.

== Planning the revolt ==
The slave revolt that led to the Haitian revolution was conceived on August 14, 1791, at a gathering of over 200 enslaved people at the estate of Lenormand de Mezy in the north of Saint-Domingue. Many of those present were coachmen or overseers, professions Geggus referred to as a part of the “slave elite.” Scholars disagree on whether the attendees made the spontaneous decision to revolt at the dinner at Leonard de Mezy. Geggus claimed that after a discussion the slaves present made the decision to revolt, while Laurent DuBois wrote that the meeting was specifically “[to make] final plans...for the uprising.” The initial leaders of this revolt were Dutty Boukman, Jean-François Papillon, George Biassou and Jeannot. Scholars generally accept that Boukman was a coachman while Papillon, Boassou and Jeannot were plantation overseers prior to the revolt. The rebels' initial plan was to capture Cap-Francais on August 25.

Seven days later, on August 21, a second meeting was held, likely at a forest called Bois Caïman behind the Choiseul plantation. The rebels convened this meeting after a comrade of theirs had been tortured until he gave a detailed confession of the revolt plans. As a result of that, the participants of the Bois Caïman meeting agreed to revolt the next day. The Bois Caiman meeting has left a large mark on Haitian history and folklore because of the religious ceremony that took place there. According to popular history, during the ceremony Dutty Boukman and priestess Cécile Fatiman prophesied that Georges Biassou, Jeannot, Jean-François Papillon would lead the revolution and then gave a speech.

== Rebellion ==
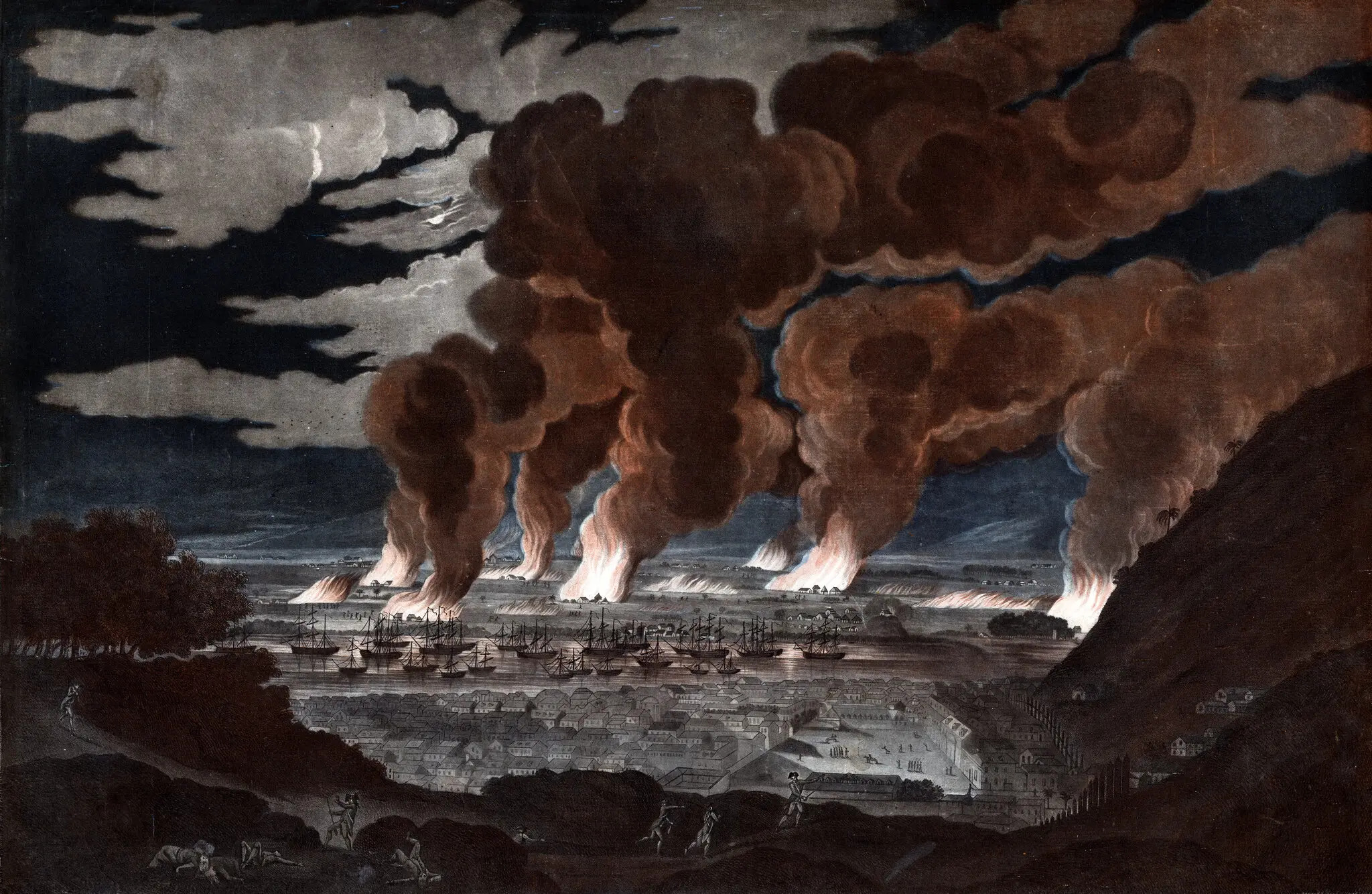
Plantations burning in the Cap-Français plain during the slave revolt of 1791

Jean-François Papillon was born in Africa but was enslaved and taken in captivity to the North Province of Saint-Domingue, where he worked in the plantation of Papillon in the last decades of the 18th century. He escaped from that plantation and became a maroon, when the revolution started on the 22nd of August 1791 he had a second experience of freedom and led the initial uprising of enslaved workers and later allied with Spain against the French.

One week after the ceremony, the rebels had destroyed 1,800 plantations and killed their former slaveholders.

Thomas Madiou's Histoire d’Haïti (English: History of Haiti) emphasises that within the first months of fighting, Georges and Jean-François became the most important insurgent leaders. Biassou commanded approximately 40,000 slaves to burn plantations and murder the "great whites". Georges and Jean proposed peace negotiations with France, offering to cease the revolt in exchange for emancipation. France was preoccupied, being at war with several monarchies and kingdoms, and hence dismissed this proposal. Concurrently, Georges and Jean developed informal contacts with Spain, which controlled Santo Domingo.

Jeannot Bullet launched vicious attacks on whites and mulattoes, devising gruesome methods of putting them to death. Toussaint Louverture was sickened by his attitudes and actions. (Beard, p. 55)

== Aftermath and reactions ==
The aftermath of the 1791 Haitian slave rebellion was decisive, resulting in the abolition of slavery in Saint-Domingue by 1793 and paving the way for Haiti's independence from France in 1804. This was the first successful formation of a nation led by former slaves. The insurrection significantly interrupted the colony's plantation economy, causing long-term economic problems. Socially, it led to a dramatic transfer of power from white elites to black and mixed-race Haitians, changing Haiti's future governance and socioeconomic structure. Internationally, Haiti's revolution encouraged other oppressed people, but it also sparked concern among countries with slave-holding economies.

British Army officer Marcus Rainsford, in his sympathetic account of the revolution An Historical Account of the Black Empire of Hayti, placed the blame for the outbreak of the rebellion on the colonial ruling class. Though not an abolitionist himself, Rainsford argued that the colonial government's inability or unwillingness to make reforms made the uprising inevitable. Rainsford also writes favorably of Toussaint Louverture, praising his character and military leadership:

His powers of invention in the art of war, and domestic government, the wonder of those who surrounded, or opposed him, had not previously an opportunity for exhibition as at the period to which we have arrived in this history. Embarrassed by a variety of contending factions among the blacks, and by enemies of different nations and characters, he was too much occupied in evading the blows constantly meditated in different quarters, to find leisure for the display of that wisdom and magnanimity which he so eminently exercised. Nevertheless a variety of incidents are recorded in the fleeting memorials of the day to corroborate the excellence of his character, and still more are impressed on the memory of all who have visited the scene of his government. Notwithstanding the absoluteness of military jurisdiction, which existed with extra power, no punishment ever took place without the anxious endeavors of the General-in-Chief to avoid it, exerted in every way that could be devised. No object was too mean for his remonstrance, or advice; nor any crime too great to be subjected to the rules he had prescribed to himself.

== See also ==
- Slavery in Haiti
- Haitian Revolution
- Independence of Haiti
- Haitian Declaration of Independence
- Armée Indigène
