= Independence of Haiti =

Haitian independence movement to end French colonial rule

In 1789, France's National Constituent Assembly made the Declaration of the Rights of Man and of the Citizen. In 1791, the enslaved Africans of Saint-Domingue began the Haitian Revolution, aimed at the overthrow of the colonial reign.

== History ==
=== Background ===
For more than one thousand years, Arawak and Taino people inhabited what was later known as Hispaniola. The name Haiti (or Hayti) comes from the indigenous Taíno language and was the native name given to the entire island of Hispaniola to mean "land of high mountains." Christopher Columbus arrived on the island on December 5, 1492 and claimed it for the Spanish Empire, after which it became known as Hispaniola. Later, under French colonial rule, the Caribbean island was known as Saint-Domingue (French pronunciation: [sɛ̃.dɔ.mɛ̃ɡ]) and was a French colony from 1659 to 1804.

Early on, enslaved people on the island began resisting captivity and fighting to restore their freedom. Examples of this resistance include the uprising of Padrejean in 1676 and the uprising of François Mackandal in 1757.

The French Revolution began in 1789. On June 21, 1791, King Louis XVI and his family attempted to flee Paris, but the plan failed due to a series of misadventures, delays, misinterpretations, and poor judgments. Louis was officially arrested on August 13, 1792, and sent to the Temple, an ancient fortress in Paris used as a prison. On September 21, the National Assembly declared France to be a republic, and abolished the monarchy. Louis was stripped of all his titles and honors, and from then on was known as Citoyen Louis Capet.

==== 1791 slave rebellion ====
News of the 1789 Declaration of the Rights of Man and of the Citizen reached Hispaniola's inhabitants and inspired them to reclaim their rights. On the night of August 14, 1791, representatives of people enslaved on local plantations gathered in the woods near Le Cap to participate in a secret ceremony. During the ceremony, Dutty Boukman and priestess Cécile Fatiman prophesied that Georges Biassou, Jeannot, and Jean-François Papillon would lead the revolution. Months later, they killed the plantation owners who had enslaved them.

==== Haitian Revolution ====
Among the many leaders of the Haitian revolution were Macaya, François Capois, Romaine-la-Prophétesse, Jean-Baptiste Belley, Magloire Ambroise, Nicolas Geffrard (general), and Étienne Élie Gerin. The battles of the revolution include:

- Battle of Croix-des-Bouquets (22 March 1792),
- Siege of Port-au-Prince (12–14 April 1793),
- Battle of Cap-Français (1793) (20–22 June 1793),
- Battle of the Acul (19 February 1794),
- Battle of Saint-Raphaël (20–21 March 1794),
- Battle of Gonaïves (29 April–5 May 1794),
- War of Knives (1799 to 1800): A civil war from June 1799 to July 1800 between the Haitian revolutionary Toussaint Louverture, and André Rigaud,
- Battle of Ravine-à-Couleuvres (23 February 1802),
- Battle of Crête-à-Pierrot (4–24 March 1802),
- Blockade of Saint-Domingue (18 June – 6 December 1803),
- Action of 28 June 1803,
- Battle of Vertières (18 November 1803)

==== 1801 Constitution ====
Prior to Haiti's Declaration of Independence in 1804, there was an initial constitution created by Toussaint Louverture in 1801. Although it did not declare Haitian independence from France, it created a Haiti which was an almost entirely self-governing French colony. Although the constitution officially outlawed slavery, it also continued the oppressive plantation system, doing so to maintain economic stability. This put Louverture at odds with many newly freed slaves who had difference desires for their emancipation. In particular, article 73 guaranteed plantation owners protection and the continued possession of their plantation holdings.

Another important way the 1801 constitution maintained Haiti's connection to France was Article 6, which explicitly made Catholicism, the dominant religion in France at this time, the only religion which was legal to practice publicly. While not an outright ban on other religions, such as Haitian Vodou, in effect this article made Catholicism the state religion of Haiti.

One more significant focus of the 1801 constitution was the creation of a deracialized society. Article 4 claimed that regardless of race, anyone could have any occupation. While Article 5 would expand on this claiming the only distinctions are those of virtue and talent, while not specifying what talents or virtues were important or valuable.

=== Haitian Declaration of Independence ===
The Haitian Declaration of Independence (French: Déclaration d'Indépendance d'Haïti) was proclaimed on January 1, 1804, in the port city of Gonaïves by Jean-Jacques Dessalines, marking the end of the 13-year-long Haitian Revolution. With this declaration, Haiti became the first independent Black nation in the Western Hemisphere.

Jean-Jacques Dessalines became the first ruler of an independent Haiti under the 1805 constitution. He was Governor-General of Haiti from January 1, 1804, to September 22, 1804, and Emperor of Haiti from September 22, 1804, to October 17, 1806.

==== Continued Fighting with France ====
On January 6, 1805, General Jean-Louis Ferrand, declared war on Haiti with the goal of restoring French rule over Haiti. Under the leadership of Henry Christophe, the Haitian side saw success aided by the British fleet. However, a surprise peace-treaty between the British and French meant the Haitian were unable to achieve their ultimate goal of complete conquest of Hispaniola and instead settle for a cease-fire with France.

==== 1805 Constitution ====
Following Dessalines declaring himself emperor in 1804, he produced Haiti's first constitution as an independent nation. Its most notable departure from the 1801 Constitution was its reemphasis on race in Haitian identity. Article 12 explicitly banned any white people from owning land. This was softened slightly by Article 13, which exempted white women, Poles, and Germans who had been naturalized by the Haitian government. However, this article did result in the dramatic decline of Haiti's white population. Furthermore, it sent a precedent which all of Haiti constitutions until 1918 would follow in prohibiting white people from owning land or becoming citizens of Haiti.

The Constitution's most radical project related to race was redefining what it meant to be black as form of national identity. Article 14 states that all Haitians were to be consider black, including those who were of mixed ethnicity and naturalized people of European descent. Unlike the 1801 Constitution, which sought to unite Haitians by ignoring race, the 1805 Constitution sought to unite Haitians under one race, which was understood to be entailed in being Haitian. In this way, Haiti's identity as a black nation was celebrated by the 1805 Constitution. Furthermore, the racial notion of blackness was redefined in political terms rather than biological.

== See also ==
- United States and the Haitian Revolution
- Armée Indigène
- Armistice of March 30, 1798
- End of slavery in Haiti
