= Yellow fever in the Haitian Revolution =

Impact of the Aedes aegypti virus on the French Expedition of 1802

Multiple scholars have studied the impact of Yellow fever, a viral disease transmitted by the Aedes aegypti mosquito, on the Haitian Revolution (1791–1804). Specifically, during the final phase of the conflict (1802–1803), the disease acted as a decisive biological force that decimated the Saint-Domingue expedition, a veteran elite force. Historians such as J.R. McNeill and Laurent Dubois argue that this biological factor, combined with the military resistance of former slaves, rendered the restoration of French colonial rule impossible and led directly to the independence of Haiti.

== Background ==
=== Leclerc Expedition (1802) ===
In January 1802, following the Peace of Amiens, Napoleon Bonaparte dispatched a massive fleet of 80 ships and approximately 31,000 soldiers (eventually reaching nearly 80,000 with successive reinforcements) under the command of his brother-in-law, General Charles-Leclerc. The mission sought to depose Toussaint Louverture and formally re-establish slavery in Saint-Domingue. While the French troops were veterans of European campaigns, they lacked prior exposure and biological defenses against Caribbean tropical diseases.

=== Group immunity ===
The Saint-Domingue population of African descent possessed a higher resistance to the disease. Many had been exposed to the virus in childhood—where it is typically less lethal—or descended from populations with partial genetic resistance. In contrast, the French were an "immunologically virgin" population, experiencing mortality rates of up to 80-85% upon infection.

== Strategic attrition ==
Revolutionary leaders like Jean-Jacques Dessalines and Henry Christophe understood that the climate was their most potent ally. They adopted a "scorched earth" policy, retreating to the mountainous interior (le morne). This forced the French to maintain long supply lines and remain stationed in coastal plains and urban centers like Cap-Français, where mosquito density and viral load were at their peak.

== Chronology (1802–1803) ==
In Spring 1802, the epidemic intensified. By May, Leclerc reported to Napoleon that 1,200 men were hospitalized and daily deaths exceeded 30.

In November 1802, General Charles-Leclerc died of yellow fever on Tortuga Island. His death shattered French morale and passed command to the Viscount of Rochambeau, whose brutal tactics further radicalized the local population.

By Autumn 1803, France had lost over 50,000 men. The depletion of troops led to the final defeat at the Battle of Vertières.

== Geopolitical consequences ==
The French defeat in Saint-Domingue, exacerbated by yellow fever, had immediate global repercussions:

- Louisiana Purchase: Deprived of his most profitable Caribbean colony, Napoleon abandoned his North American imperial ambitions and sold the Louisiana Territory to the United States in 1803.
- Consolidation of Island Division: The Haitian victory sealed the political separation of the island of Hispaniola. Historically, this territorial division was rooted in the Osorio Devastations (1605–1606), which left the western part of the island depopulated and vulnerable to original French settlement.
