= Ortega House (St. Augustine) =

Coordinates: 29°53′44″N 81°18′47″W

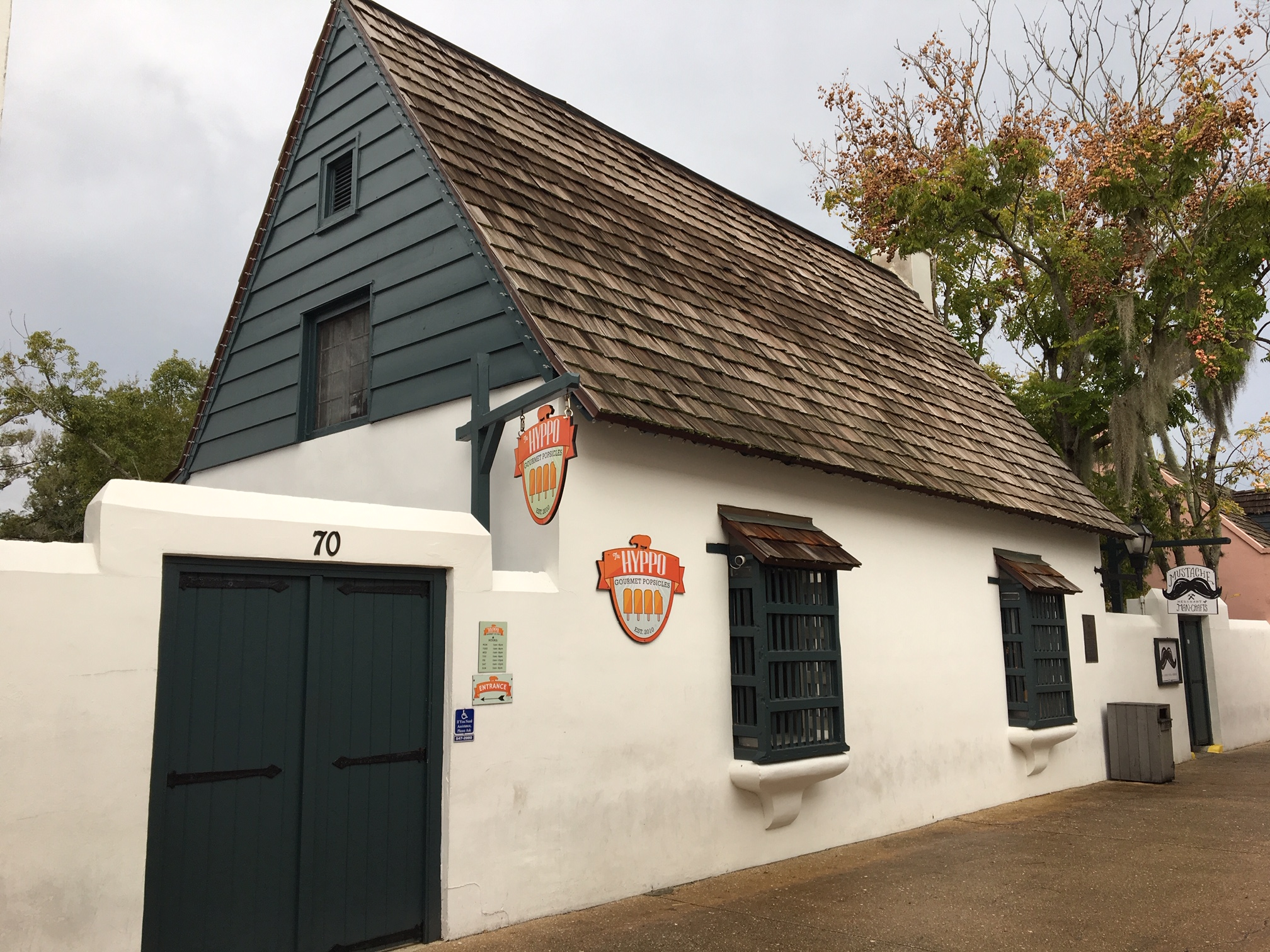
Ortega House, 2018

The Ortega House is located at 70 St. George Street in St. Augustine, Florida. It is a reconstructed home representing the architectural style of the First Spanish Period (1565–1763) in Florida.

== History ==
A house first appears at this site on a Spanish map dating to 1763. A map from one year later tells us that the inhabitants were descendants of one Nicolas de Ortega, who was listed as an armorer at the Castillo de San Marcos. De Ortega died in 1762. It is expected that when Spain ceded Florida to Great Britain with the 1763 Treaty of Paris, British agent Jesse Fish took over temporary ownership of the property. The British governor granted the property in November 1779 to a John Proctor. After Proctor's death the house was sold in June 1787, at public sale, for 250 pounds to James Scotland, carpenter. When Spain again changed hands in 1783, Scotland left Florida and gave his house to William Slater to sell. The British Period saw a kitchen and loggia added to the house.

Minorcan Sebastian Ortega purchased the house in 1791 and made significant changes to it. He put on a new roof, replastered walls, and put in a tabby floor. After passing through the hands of other families, Miguel Andreu bought the home in 1815, which was then in poor condition. The Andreu family held this property until the 1830s.

== Restoration ==
In 1967, the St. Augustine Historical Restoration and Preservation Commission decided to spend $60,000 to purchase the Edmunds-Rogers property, which encompassed the site of the present day Ortega House. After the reconstruction project was completed, the Ortega House was leased as a private residence. Mr. and Mrs. George Waldron lived in the house beginning September 1, 1968. Other residential spaces for rent in the restored area were a building in back of the Spanish Inn, one apartment on the second floor of the Salcedo House, two apartments in the Watson House, and one apartment on the second floor of the Benet Store.

== Present day ==
Today, the Ortega House is owned by the St. Augustine Foundation, Inc. It is a retail space operated by The Hyppo Gourmet Ice Pops.
