= Vincent Ogé =

Saint-Dominigan merchant, military officer and revolutionary (1755–1764)

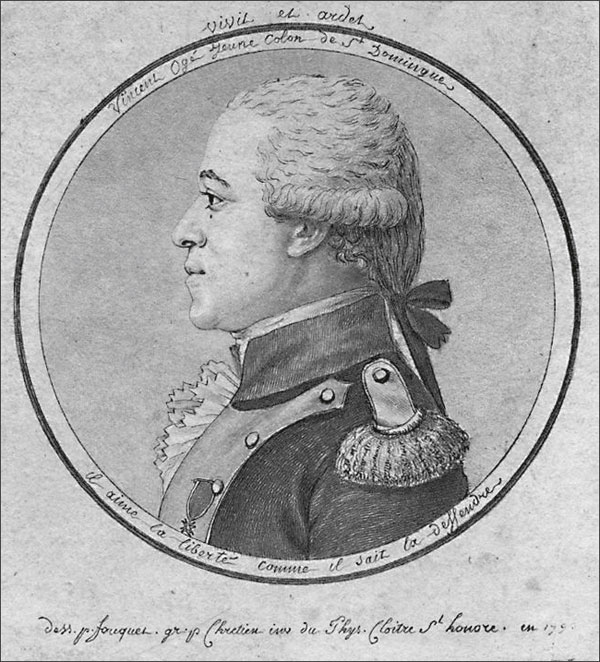
- 1790 portrait of Ogé
- Born: c. 1757; Dondon, Saint-Domingue
- Died: February 6, 1791 (aged 33–34); Cap‑Français, Saint-Domingue
- Cause of death: Execution by breaking wheel
- Occupations: Merchant, military officer and goldsmith
- Known for: Leading a failed uprising against French colonial rule
- Parent(s): Jacques Ogé; Angélique Ossé

Vincent Ogé (French pronunciation: [vɛ̃sɑ̃ ɔʒe]; c. 1757 – 6 February 1791) was a Saint-Domingan merchant, military officer and revolutionary who had a leading role in a failed uprising against French colonial rule in the colony of Saint-Domingue in 1790. A mixed-race member of the colonial elite, Ogé's revolt occurred just before the Haitian Revolution, which resulted in the colony's independence from France, and left a contested legacy in post-independence Haiti.

Born in Saint-Domingue into a family of the planter class, Ogé was sent at the age of eleven to the city of Bordeaux, France by his parents to be apprenticed to a goldsmith. Returning to the colony after seven years, he settled down in Cap‑Français as a coffee merchant in the employ of his uncle, acquiring partial ownership of his family's plantation. By the 1780s, Ogé's business dealings had made him the richest merchant of African descent in the city.

In 1788, Ogé travelled to France to both clear his debts and bring several lawsuits his family was engaged in before the Conseil du Roi. A year later, the French Revolution began, and he joined the revolutionary camp. After absentee white planters rejected his proposals for abolishing discriminatory colonial laws against free people of colour, he joined an advocacy group whose members demanded political representation in the national assembly.

In March 1790, deputies of the assembly approved a law granting voting rights to free people of colour in French colonies. In the same month, Ogé returned to Saint-Domingue, where he rebelled against the colonial government after it refused to implement the law. The uprising was suppressed, and Ogé was captured and executed.

== Early life ==
Vincent Ogé was born c. 1757 in Dondon, Saint-Domingue. At the time, Saint-Domingue formed the western part of the island of Hispaniola and was under French colonial rule as part of France's colonies in the West Indies. Ogé's parents were Jacques Ogé, a white Frenchman, and Angélique Ossé, a free woman of color; he also had several brothers and sisters. The Ogé family owned a coffee plantation, which was operated by a number of enslaved labourers and provided the primary source of the family's wealth. Ossé also held a contract to supply meat to the Dondon markets.

At the age of eleven, Ogé was sent to Bordeaux in France by his parents in 1768. There, he was apprenticed to a goldsmith for approximately seven years, returning to Saint-Domingue in 1775. Instead of returning to Dondon, Ogé settled down in the colonial capital of Cap‑Français, working for his uncle Vincent as a commission agent in the colony's coffee trade. During this period, Ogé acquired partial ownership of his family's slave plantation. In the 1780s, Ogé also became the owner of a merchant schooner operating out of the colony along with three of his business partners.

Ogé soon expanded his commercial network, engaging in business deals with merchants in many of Saint-Domingue's major ports and working as a real estate agent in Cap‑Français, subletting valuable properties to the colonial elite. In large part due to his business dealings, Ogé eventually became the wealthiest businessman of African descent who was active in Cap‑Français during the 1780s. However, by 1788 Ogé fell deeply in debt, owing 60,000 to 70,000 livres to his creditors, and decided to relocate to Port-au-Prince with a quantity of trade goods and several slaves.

== Revolutionary activities ==
After settling down in Port-au-Prince, Ogé resumed working as a merchant, selling his goods and helping a ship's captain liquidate his cargo. However, he continued to acquire debt, though after six months he had earned 120,000 livres. Around the same time, Ogé made plans to travel to France and purchase goods to resell in Saint-Domingue and pay off his creditors. There was also the issue of construction efforts in Dondon leading to Ogé's family to file a number of lawsuits (over their slaves being injured by falling boulders), which Ogé hoped to bring before the Conseil du Roi.

In 1788, he travelled to France for a second time. A year later, the French Revolution began, and Ogé, who was in Paris at the time, embraced the cause of the revolutionaries. In August 1789, he approached a group of absentee planters to discuss proposals for abolishing discriminatory laws against free people of colour in Saint-Dominingue. The planter's rejection of his proposals led Ogé to join a group of free people of colour led by white lawyer Étienne de Joly, whose members demanded representation for mulatto people from the colonies in the National Constituent Assembly.

By October 1789, Ogé had enlisted as an officer in the Paris militia, joining the abolitionist Society of the Friends of the Blacks around the same period. Along with Julien Raimond, he quickly became the leaders of de Joly's group, and the public face of the political concerns of free people of colour in France. In their arguments to the National Constituent Assembly, Ogé and Raimond pushed for Black representation and total voting rights for free people of colour in Saint-Domingue. As both men were slaveholders, they expressed support for slavery's continued existence in the colonies.

In March 1790, deputies of the National Constituent Assembly approved an ambiguously worded law granting full voting rights to free people of colour in French colonies. After the law had passed, Ogé returned to Saint-Domingue, travelling in secret to avoid attracting attention from hostile planters. During his journey, he made a stop in London to consult with abolitionists in Britain, including Thomas Clarkson. After meeting with Clarkson, who was sympathetic towards Ogé's arguments for rights for free people of colour, he landed in Saint-Domingue via Charleston, South Carolina.

In October 1790, in the same month as his arrival in the colony, Ogé met with Jean-Baptiste Chavannes, a non-commissioned officer in the colonial militia. Together, the two men sent a letter to Governor Philibert François Rouxel de Blanchelande and the colony's assembly, demanding that the colonial government grant free people of color the full rights stipulated in the March 1790 law. However, both refused, leading to Ogé and Chavannes to conspire to overthrow the colonial government by force, gathering approximately 300 free men of color 12 miles outside Cap‑Français.

== Uprising, capture and execution ==
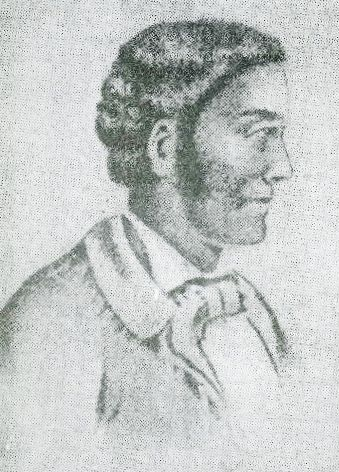
A late 19th-century illustration of Jean-Baptiste Chavannes

After receiving reports of Ogé and Chavannes' activities in late October, the colonial government dispatched a force of roughly 600 militia led by a Général de Vincent to defeat the rebels. However, the rebels managed to hold their ground and repulsed the force sent against them, which was forced to retreat back to Cap‑Français. The rebels, many of whom had served in the colonial militia, organised themselves into battalions, elected officers and fortified their positions.

In response to the failure of the initial attack, a subordinate of de Vincent, Colonel Cambefort, was sent from Cap‑Français with 1,500 men to launch a second attack on the rebels. Cambefort's troops, many of them French Royal Army soldiers, routed Ogé and Chavannes' rebels, a large number of which had already deserted. Ogé and Chavannes managed to escape the colonial government and fled to the nearby Captaincy General of Santo Domingo, a Spanish colony.

On 20 November 1790, Ogé and 23 rebels, including Chavannes, were captured by the colonial authorities in the town of Hinche, surrendering after receiving guarantees of safety from the Spanish. However, the Spanish colonial authorities handed over Ogé and his associates to their French counterparts; the rebels were marched to Cap‑Français under armed guard and imprisoned. In January 1791, Ogé was interviewed by the French prosecutor Bocquet de Frévent.

In February 1791, Ogé was finally placed on trial by the colonial government in Cap‑Français. He was sentenced to death, and Ogé was executed by being broken on the wheel on 6 February in the presence of Blanchelande and several politicians from the colonial assembly. After his execution, Ogé's head was cut off and placed onto a pike for public display, a punishment previously inflicted on rebels by the colonial government in previous slave rebellions.

Six months after Ogé's executions, rebel slaves led by Dutty Boukman rose in revolt, sparking the Haitian Revolution. Though Ogé never fought against the institution of slavery itself, his execution was frequently cited by rebel slaves during the revolution as a justification for continuing to resist the French colonial government rather than accept prospective peace treaties. After twelve years of fighting, the rebels successfully overthrew French rule in Saint-Domingue.

== Personal life, family and legacy ==
As noted by historian Larry Chen, "Ogé's identity, even his name, has been the subject of some confusion." After his death, historians made disparate claims about Ogé's background and revolutionary activities, though they consistently remarked on the uniqueness of someone from the mostly-conservative mulatto upper class attempting to overthrow French rule by force. Garrigus also noted that Ogé's 1791 interview with de Frévent stated that his surname was actually spelt with an "Au" instead of an "O", meaning that it could've been spelt Augé or Auger instead of Ogé.

Ogé was born into a large family and had seven siblings in addition to an unknown number of whom died at a young age. He had three brothers, Joseph, Jacques, Jean-Pierre and Alexandre, the last of whom had been adopted by Ogé's parents. Ogé also had three sisters, Françoise, Angélique and a third sister whose name is unknown; prior to 1788, Françoise and Angélique had moved to Bordeaux. Though he never married, Ogé employed a housekeeper named Marie Magdeleine Garette from 1781 until 1783, when he finally paid her by deeding Garette a young slave girl.

Views of Ogé in historiography, both inside and out of Haiti, varied enormously. In 1914, American racial scientist Lothrop Stoddard dismissively wrote in The French Revolution in San Domingo that Ogé was "convinced that he was destined to lead a successful rising of his caste." Twenty-four years later, Trinidadian historian C. L. R. James denounced Ogé in The Black Jacobins as a member of the French bourgeoisie "whose gifts were unsuited to the task before him." In 1988, British historian Robin Blackburn claimed Ogé was a fellow traveller of the Freemasons in France.

Among African Americans, Ogé was positively remembered during the Antebellum Period. In 1853, the poet and abolitionist George Boyer Vashon wrote a 359-line poem titled Vincent Ogé, which included the stanzas "Thy coming fame, Ogé! Is sure; Thy name with that of L'Ouverture". A similarly positive view of Ogé prevailed in Haiti during the 19th century, and was used to promote the supremacy of Haiti's mulatto elite. This led Ogé's reputation in Haiti to collapse by the 20th century, and he was described in Haitian historiography as a "flawed and minor revolutionary figure." As historian Jean Casimir puts it, his name "barely echoes in the collective memory of contemporary Haiti."
