= Voûte-à-Minguet =

Cave in Dondon with precolumbian petroglyphs

Voûte à Minguet
- Cave of Minguet
- Location within Haiti
- Location: Dondon, Haiti
- Coordinates: 19°31′27″N 72°15′46″W
- Geology: Eocene limestone

The Voûte-à-Minguet (Minguet cave) is a cave in Dondon, Nord, Haiti, with precolumbian petroglyphs and graffitis from the first Spanish and French settlers. It is now used for vodou ceremonies.

The cave is included in the National History Park and is one of Dondon's main tourist attractions.

== History ==
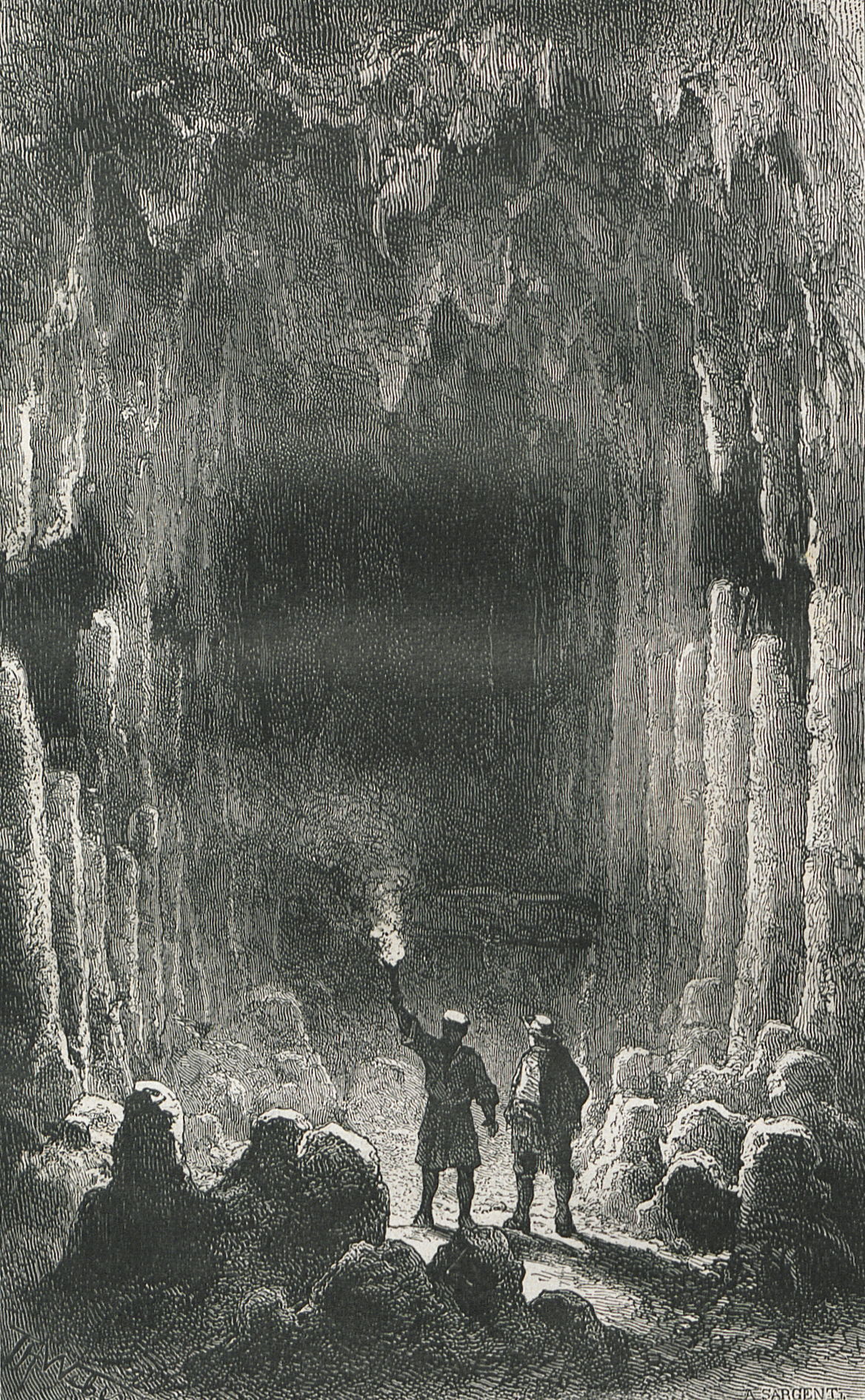
19th century representation of Voûte à Minguet cave

Indigenous populations have used the cave since ancient times, and petroglyphs attributed to the Taíno people are present. Moreau de Saint-Méry writes that caciques from many places went into the cave to pray to their gods.

Early visitors reported finding many artifacts (zemis) in the cave. However, archaeologists have never thoroughly studied the cave since it was plundered of all its artifacts in the 17th century.

== Toponymy ==
The cave's name is from the privateer André Minguet, who was given ownership of the land in 1698. It is mistakenly said that the name comes from the creole word Minguette (Lily of the valley),
