= Julien Raimond =

French abolitionist (1744–1801)

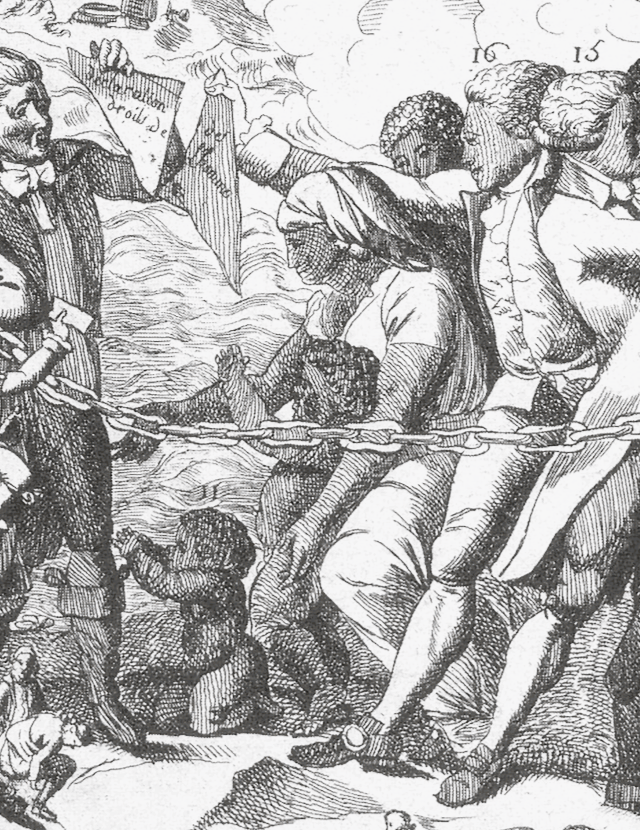
- The only known portrait of Julien Raimond (on the right, beneath the number 16), taken from a 1791 print depicting the Assembly's debates regarding the status of people of color.

Julien Raimond (1744–1801) was a Saint Dominican indigo planter in the French colony of Saint-Domingue, now the Republic of Haiti, who became a leader in its revolution and the formation of Haiti.

== Early activism ==
He was born a free man of color; the son of a French colonist and a colored mother born to a planter in the isolated Sud province of the colony. His mother, Marie Bagasse, was significantly wealthier and more educated than his father, Pierre Raimond, providing an economic incentive for their interracial marriage. Raimond was a slave owner, as many free people of color from the colony were. He owned over 100 slaves by the 1780s and was one of the wealthiest men in his racial class in the colony. But he is most famous for challenging the French government to reform racially discriminatory laws against free people of color in Saint-Domingue. He worked alongside leaders such as Toussaint L'Ouverture to help shape the 1801 Constitution of Saint-Domingue (Haiti). In 1785 he moved to France to pursue this quest at the French Colonial Ministry.

The outbreak of the French Revolution in 1789, in particular the publication of the Declaration of the Rights of Man and of the Citizen, prompted Raimond to take his case before the National Constituent Assembly. In December 1789, Raimond and other representatives of free people of color presented “Supplique et pétition des citoyens de couleur des isles et colonies françoises” to the French National Assembly, arguing that colonial assemblies failed to adequately represent free people of color. Working with Vincent Ogé, Henri Grégoire and the Society of the Friends of the Blacks (of which he was eventually elected leader), Raimond succeeded in making the question of equal rights for free people of color into the leading colonial question before the National Assembly in 1790 and 1791.

== Laws ==
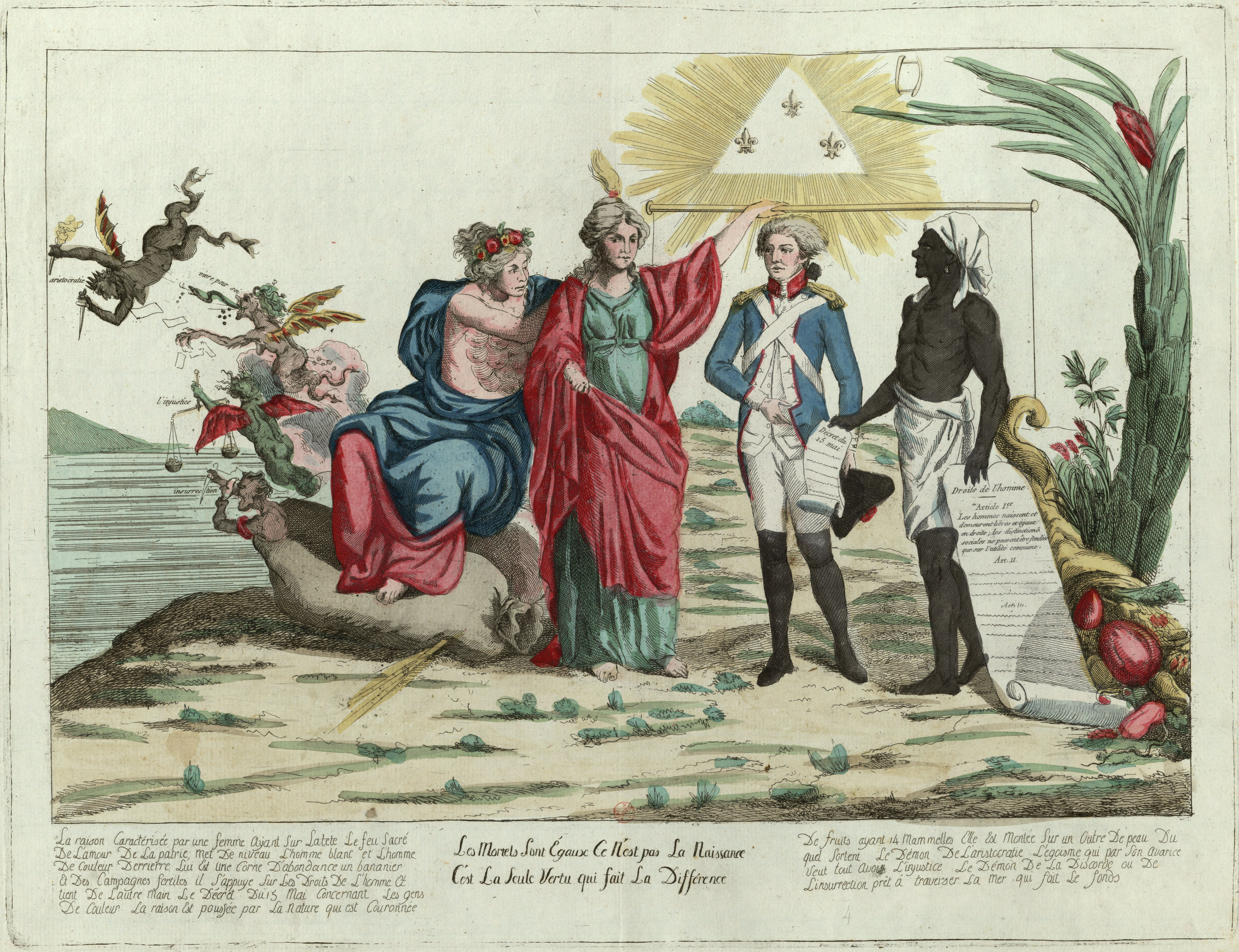
"Mortals are equal, it is not birth, but virtue alone that makes the difference".

On 15 May 1791, the French legislature passed racial reforms urged by Raimond giving wealthy free-born men of color the right to vote in the colonies. But White colonists' resistance to this change provoked civil war in Saint-Domingue. Along with the decree of May 15 1791, The Code Noir of 1685 (Black Code) governed slavery in the French Colonies regarded enslaved Blacks as property but granted some liberties to free people of color (mostly of mixed descent). Raimond along with other abolitionist like Abbé Grégoire, fought for liberation of free people of color separate from Blacks using Code Noir as a common piece of evidence. The fragmentation of colonial society that occurred as a result of these racial disputes exacerbated tensions, leading to August 1791 when slaves organized the massive revolt that eventually became the Haitian Revolution.

Raimond published about two dozen political pamphlets in France. One piece entitled Observations on the Origin and Progression of the White Colonists' Prejudice against Men of Color, attempts to describe the racial history of the prejudice on the small island for the purpose of garnering sympathies from the National Assembly. In his other works, he lays out plans for the gradual emancipation of France's colonial slaves. His projects were surpassed when France's Commissioner Léger-Félicité Sonthonax recognized the freedom of the rebels before Raimond's plans were put into action. Raimond eventually returned twice to Saint-Domingue, once with Sonthonax, as an agent of the Revolutionary government, helping re-establish the plantation system after the end of slavery. Though a long advocate of loyalty to France, Raimond ultimately allied with Toussaint L'Ouverture and was one of 10 men who served on a committee that wrote a self-governing Constitution for Saint-Domingue in 1801. Raimond died shortly after the document was published at the age of 57. Although most of Julien Raimond's political activity took place in Paris, his activism on behalf of free people of color and later all Haitians, played a very significant role in the Haitian Revolution. He was different from other colonial activists for racial change because he never fought physically but instead with his writings and political essays. Raimond represented a different and more conservative element of mixed-race Haiti that was finally persuaded to support the Haitian Revolution.

== Sources ==
- Cook, Mercer. 1941. Julien Raimond. The Journal of Negro History 26, no. 2: 139–170.
- Cauna, Jacques de, 1992, Julien Raimond, un quarteron d'origine landaise à la tête de la révolution des gens de couleur à Saint-Domingue, dans Actes du colloque Les Landes et la Révolution, 29–30 Sept. 1989, publié par le Conseil Général des Landes, Mont-de-Marsan, 1992, p. 125–135.
- Cauna, Jacques de, 1998, Origines et ascension des gens de couleur : la famille Raimond, et Une élite aquitaine de sang-mêlés, Julien Raimond, un mulâtre landais chef de file des hommes de couleur, dans L'Eldorado des Aquitains. Gascons, Basques et Béarnais aux Îles d'Amérique (17e-18e s.), p. 188–198 et 384–387.
- Dubois, Laurent. 2004. Avengers of the New World: The Story of the Haitian Revolution. Harvard University Press.
- Dubois, Laurent, and John D. Garrigus. Slave Revolution in the Caribbean 1789–1804. Boston: Bedford/St. Martin's, 2006. 18–22, 78–82. Print.
- Garrigus, John D. 2007. Opportunist or Patriot? Julien Raimond (1744–1801) and the Haitian Revolution. Slavery & Abolition 28, no. 1: 1–21.
- Raimond, Julien. 1789. Observations adressées à l'Assemblée Nationale par un deputé des colons américains. Paris.
- Raimond, Julien. 1791. Observations sur l'origine et les progrès du préjugé des colons blancs contre les hommes de couleur. Paris: Belin.
