= Tolomato Cemetery =

Cemetery in St. Augustine, Florida

Coordinates: 29°53′49.2″N 81°18′54.2″W

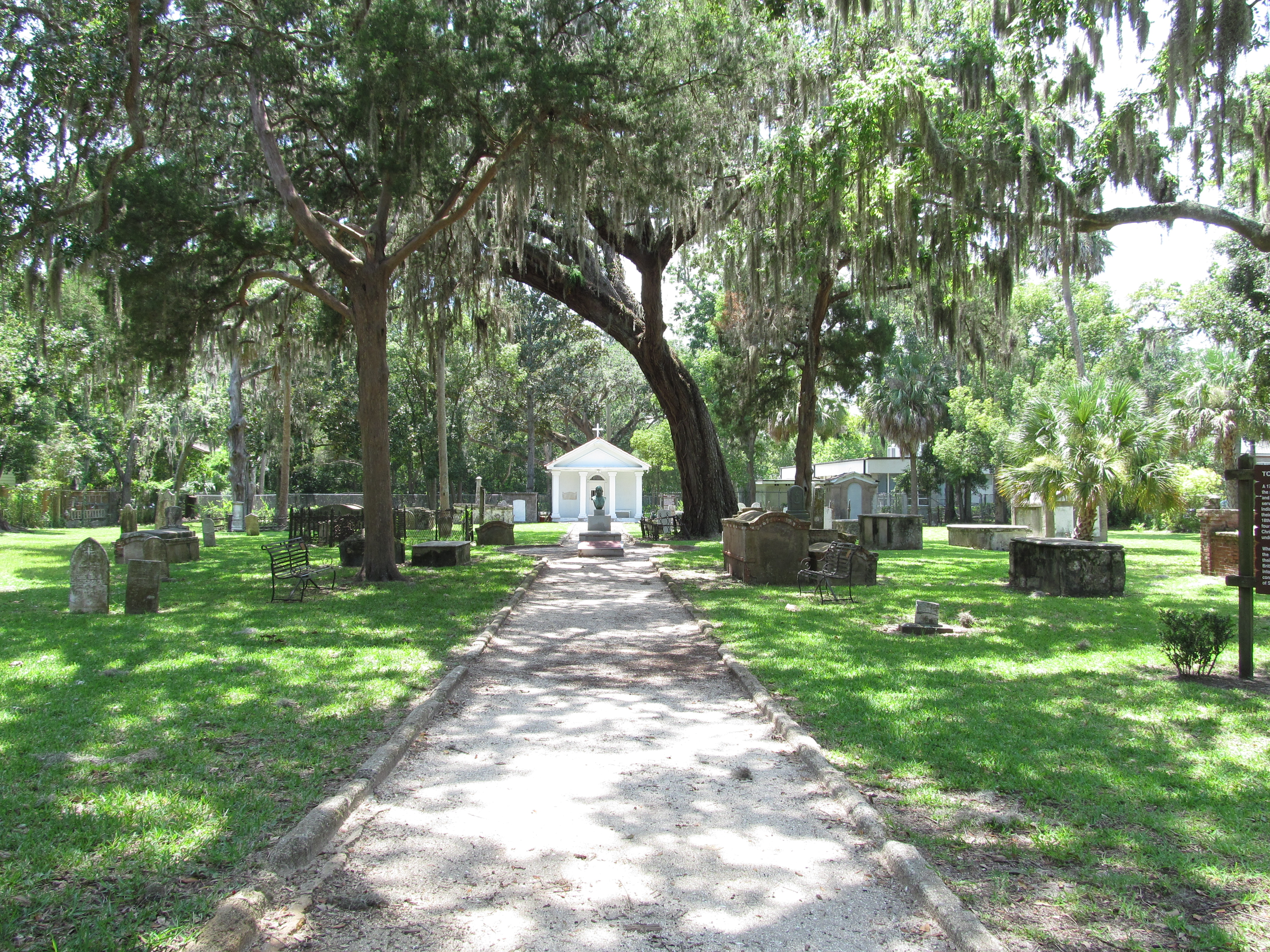
The cemetery, from the entryway, in July 2012

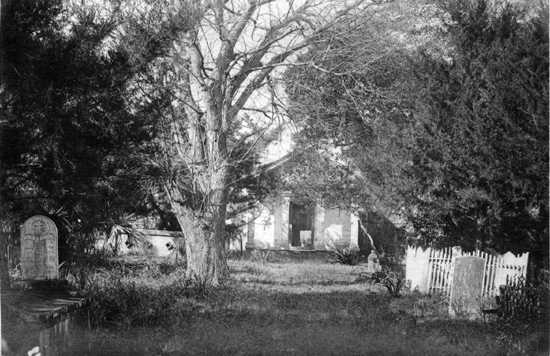
The cemetery in 1910

Tolomato Cemetery (Spanish: Cementerio de Tolomato) is a Catholic cemetery located on Cordova Street in St. Augustine, Florida. The cemetery was the former site of "Tolomato", a village of Guale Indian converts to Christianity and the Franciscan friars who ministered to them. The site of the village and Franciscan mission is noted on a 1737 map of St. Augustine. A cemetery for the inhabitants of the village was also located on the grounds, with a portion of this cemetery set aside for former American black slaves, who had converted to Catholicism after escaping bondage in the Carolinas.

The location of Tolomato was just outside the city across from the Rosario Line, a defensive line constructed in the First Spanish Period, which consisted of an earthen embankment planted with cactus and Yucca gloriosa, also known as Spanish daggers.

== History ==
=== Tolomato mission ===
When Britain gained control of St. Augustine in 1763 most of the Spanish population of 3,100 left for Cuba along with many of the Native American converts to Christianity, including the friars and inhabitants of Tolomato. The British occupants being primarily Protestant had no need of the wooden Catholic church on the site and tore it down for firewood, leaving the coquina bell tower intact.

When, in 1777 the residents of Andrew Turnbull's colony of New Smyrna decided to flee the dismal conditions en masse, they walked 70 miles north on the King's Road to St. Augustine. These refugees, indentured servants from the Mediterranean, a majority from the island of Menorca, were granted refuge by the British governor Patrick Tonyn.

The spiritual leader of these refugees collectively known as the Menorcans, Father Pedro Camps, petitioned the governor for permission to use the old mission and village of Tolomato for his constituents who were mostly Catholic. The petition was granted and the grounds became the prime burial ground for the Menorcan colonists.

=== Tolomato Cemetery ===
The cemetery continued to be used as a Catholic cemetery by the Menorcans' descendants as well as other Catholics throughout the various changes of regime in St. Augustine from British back to Spanish in 1783, to American control in 1821. The cemetery was officially closed in 1884 along with the nearby Huguenot Cemetery, but received two more, unauthorized, burials: those of Catalina Usina Llambias, who died in 1886, and Robert Sabate, who died in 1892. In both cases, the family of the deceased were fined $25.00 for violating the law.

The first Bishop of St. Augustine, Augustin Verot, who died in 1876, is interred in the mortuary chapel at the back of the cemetery. Father Camps, who died in 1790, was originally buried at Tolomato, then re-interred 10 years later at the newly built cathedral. Félix Varela, a Cuban priest and social reformer, was buried at Tolomato for 60 years until his remains were disinterred and taken back to Cuba.

An historically significant early burial is that of America's first black general, Jorge Biassou. A leader of the Haitian Revolution of 1791, Biassou became, in the twists and turns of international politics, a Spanish general. He was sent to St. Augustine in 1796, as the second highest-paid official of the colony, and stayed until his death in 1801. His funeral was held at Cathedral Basilica of St. Augustine, and he was buried in Tolomato in a grave that is now unmarked. In recent years the cemetery has become a place of pilgrimage for members of the Haitian-American Historical Society and many Haitian diplomats, including Ambassador Raymond Joseph (donor of a bench in front of the chapel in Biassou's memory), who have worked to gain public recognition for our first black general. On June 27, 2011, a historic marker was finally unveiled, a couple of blocks away at 42 St. George Street, on the home site of General Biassou.

Also buried within the cemetery are a number of Confederate soldiers, including some members of the Saint Augustine Blues, the local militia unit which took possession of the St. Francis Barracks and the Castillo de San Marcos for the Confederacy at the beginning of the American Civil War.

Gumercindo Antonio Pacetti (1825–1877), a Menorcan, was Mayor of St. Augustine and surrendered the city to the Federals in March 1862. He went to the family home in Cuba where he hosted escaped Confederate Secretary of War and former U.S. Vice President John C. Breckinridge. Pacetti returned to the city and is buried in Tolomato Cemetery.
