= Battle of Saint-Raphaël =

Battle during the Haitian Revolution

- Part of the Haitian Revolution and the War of the First Coalition
| Date | 20–21 March 1794 |
| Location | Saint-Raphaël, Haiti |
| Result | French victory |

Belligerents
| France | Spain |

Commanders and leaders
| Toussaint Louverture | Jean-François Papillon |

Strength
| 4,800 men | Unknown |

Casualties and losses
| Unknown | 200 deaths 50 wounded |

The Battle of Saint-Raphaël took place during the Haitian Revolution.

== Battle ==
Toussaint, pushed back to Saint-Marc, turned to Saint-Raphaël and Saint-Michel occupied by the forces of Jean-François. After two days of fighting, the two towns were taken over by the crushed Republicans and Spaniards.

From Saint-Michel, on October 21, Toussaint writes to Lavaux:

I hasten to tell you about the success of my expedition on Saint-Raphaël and Saint-Michel. The successes would have been more complete, if I could have taken all the Spaniards from these two places; but the night has favored them in their retreat. Nevertheless, I took two officers and about fifty soldiers, both wounded and well. I had in my people, many wounded and killed.

The Spaniards were forced to abandon many weapons, their artillery and ammunition. I have not yet taken a note of what I took from them, having not had the time: I will take care of it and I will send you a detail not the next mail. I'm going back to Saint-Raphaël to have the war paraphernalia charmed and put in a safe place.
As we would need a lot of ammunition and troops to guard these two boroughs, and that these troops are more necessary to us elsewhere, I am going to pass in the French part the horses and the cattle with horns. This operation done, I will shave the two boroughs, as well as the huts outside, so that the enemy can not make any attempt and to keep it away from us.
I wish you good health.
Hello in the homeland and its successes.

P.S.: Having stormed the trench or advanced of Saint-Raphaël, I slaughtered nearly ninety Spaniards with my cavalry, finally all those who did not want to surrender.

== Bibliography ==
- Bell, Madison Smartt (2007). Toussaint Louverture. Actes Sud.
- Madiou, Thomas (1847). Histoire d'Haïti, Tome I (in French).
- Schœlcher, Victor (1982) [1889]. Vie de Toussaint Louverture (in French). Éditions Karthala.
