= Battle of the Acul =

- Part of the Haitian Revolution and the War of the First Coalition
Date	19 February 1794
Location	L'Acul, close to Léogâne, Haiti 18°30′39″N 72°37′53″W
Result	British and allied victory

Belligerents
France	(Kingdom of Great Britain) Great Britain (Kingdom of France) French Royalists

Commanders and leaders
Unknown	John Whitelocke

Strength
Unknown	4 regiments 2 cannons 2 howitzers

Casualties and losses
Unknown	More than 60 dead

The Battle of the Acul took place on 19 February 1794 during the Haitian Revolution.

== Battle ==
Following an attempted push back to Port-de-Paix, British General John Whitelocke decides to attack the Fortress of Acul, located a league from the town of Léogâne. The 13th, 20th, 49th and 62nd British regiments, composed of European soldiers, land in this city and then march the fort. The latter was stormed after a three-hour battle during which Baron de Montalembert, Colonel Spencer, Captain Vincent, the elite companies of the 49th and the light infantry of the Royal Guards and 49th. A young black Republican, however, fires in the powder keg of the fort which causes an explosion that kills 60 English soldiers.

== Bibliography ==
- Madiou, Thomas (1847). Histoire d'Haïti, Tome I (in French).
