= Jean-Baptiste Chavannes =

Haitian abolitionist and soldier

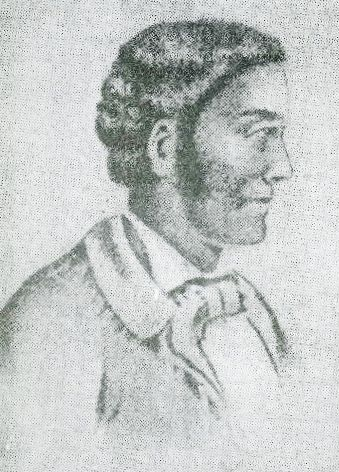
- Portrait of Jean-Baptiste Chavannes by J. Verschueren
- Born: c.1748 Grande-Rivière-du-Nord, Saint-Domingue (later Haiti)
- Died: 23 February 1791 (aged 42–43); Cap-Français
- Known for: Rebel soldier (Vincent Ogé's right hand), serving in the Chasseurs-Volontaires de Saint-Domingue regiment

Jean-Baptiste Chavannes (c. 1748 – 23 February 1791) was a Dominican Creole abolitionist, and rebel soldier. He was a leader in a failed uprising against French colonial rule in the colony of Saint-Domingue in 1790. He was executed by French authorities in 1791.

== Biography ==
He was the son of rich parents of mixed European and African ancestry, and received a good education. Chevannes joined the expedition commanded by Charles Henri Hector, Count of Estaing that was sent to assist the U.S. Continental Army in Haiti. He distinguished himself during the operations in Virginia and New York, and specially during the retreat from Savannah in December 1778. Once the independence of the American colonies had been accomplished, Chavannes returned to Saint-Domingue.

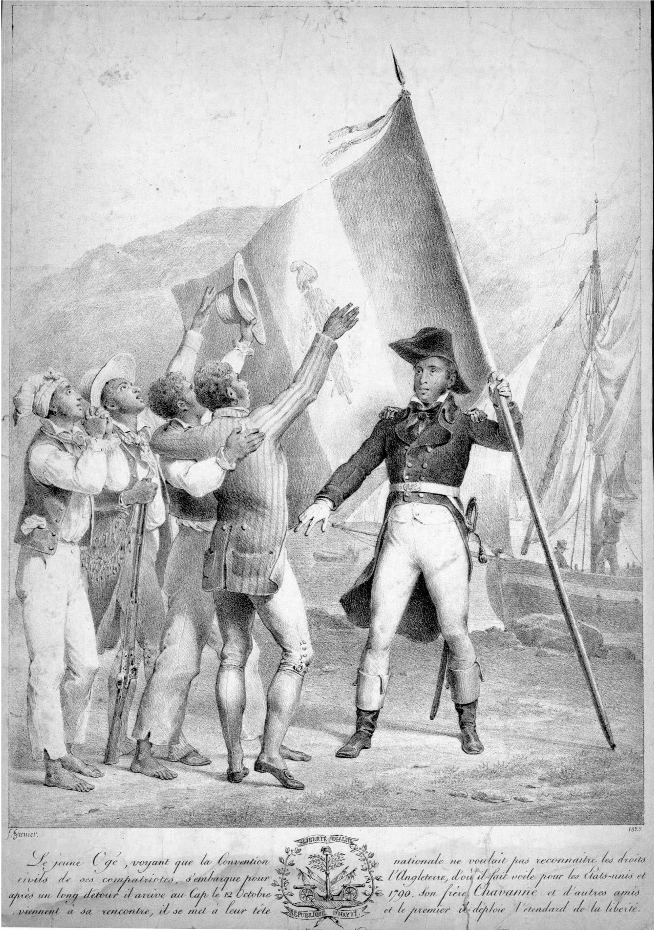
Chavannes welcoming Ogé on his arrival in Saint-Domingue

When Vincent Ogé landed near Cap-Français, 23 October 1790, intending to create an agitation amongst the people of African descent in favor of their political rights, Chavannes sided with him. Chavannes wanted all the slaves to be declared free, but Ogé did not follow his advice, and informed the assembly of his intention to take the opposite course. The mulattoes raised a force of about 1,000 men.

The mulattoes being defeated by the colonists, Ogé, Chavannes, and a few others took refuge in the Spanish part of the island, and the Saint Dominican assembly asked for their extradition, according to treaty. The jurist Vicente Faura made a powerful plea in their favor, and the king of Spain gave him a decoration, but the Royal Audiencia of Santo Domingo decided against the refugees, who were delivered to the Saint Dominican authorities on 21 December 1790.

Two months later Chavannes and Ogé were sentenced to be hammered to death, and the sentence was executed in the presence of the provincial assembly and authorities of Cap-Français.
