= Jean-François Papillon =

Leader in the Haitian Revolution

Jean-François Papillon (French pronunciation: [ʒɑ̃ fʁɑ̃swa papijɔ̃]; died in the early 1800s) was one of the principal leaders in the Haitian Revolution against slavery and French rule. He led the initial uprising of enslaved workers and later allied with Spain against the French.

Papillon was born in Africa but enslaved and taken in captivity to the North Province of Saint-Domingue (the future nation of Haiti). There he worked in the plantation of Papillon in the last decades of the 18th century. He escaped from that plantation and became a maroon, so when the revolution started in August 1791, he had already enjoyed a direct experience of freedom.

== Ascent to power ==
Right after the death of Boukman Dutty, the insurgent slaves’ first leader, Jean-François Papillon imposed his authority over the other black generals, especially Georges Biassou, Jeannot Bullet, and Toussaint Bréda (later Toussaint Louverture), and became commander-in-chief of the Haitian former slaves. By late 1791, some weeks after the revolutionary outbreak, Jean-François and Biassou set their rivalry aside in order to oppose Jeannot, who not only massacred the French but also all the black soldiers that contested his authority. For that reason, Biassou and Jean-François arrested and executed him by November 1791. It has often been assumed that Jean-François and his men rose up in rebellion to win universal freedom, but their real intention was to gain as much power as possible and return the rest of the slaves to the plantations when the revolution was over and the generals had already achieved power. Jean-François confessed his convictions to the North American agents in Le Cap Français: “[...] that General told us that he had not created himself General of the negroes, that those who had that power had confered [sic] upon him that title; that in taking up arms, he never pretended to fight for General Liberty, which he knew to be an illusion."

== Relation with Spain ==
There are many reasons that the Spaniards backed the Haitian revolution from the beginning, providing the insurgents with food and weapons: they knew that the episode would cause chaos in Saint-Domingue, giving Spain the chance to send troops to that territory and re-annex it, since it had been a Spanish possession taken by the French in the Peace Treaty of Ryswick (1697). In October 1791, the black General Toussaint Bréda admitted his contacts with the Spaniards, who had promised them provisions. As Spain was officially neutral towards the French Revolution, of which Saint-Domingue’s revolution was regarded as a mere echo, it kept its contacts with the black leaders in secret.

Spain’s attitude changed from late January 1793, when the French National Convention executed Louis XVI. From then on, the Spanish government considered that it was unnecessary to stay officially neutral towards France and both countries declared war on each other in March 1793. As a consequence, Charles IV of Spain issued his instructions to the Dominican authorities, which needed to begin official dealings with Saint-Domingue’s black generals to persuade them to join the Dominican army.

Negotiations, which were carried out by the mulatto priest José Vázquez, finished on May 6, 1793 with Jean-François’ oath of loyalty to the Spanish King in his name and in the name of his soldiers. The said oath was confirmed by Jean-François some days later, in an official letter addressed to the Dominican Archbishop, Fernando del Portillo y Torres. Nevertheless, the slave leaders made it clear that they did not support the Spanish King as an end in itself, but as a means of avenging the French King, the Spanish sovereign’s cousin.

== Triumphs and problems at the service of Spain ==
Jean-François and his collaborators became Carlos IV’s black auxiliary troops, since the colour of their skin prevented the Spaniards from considering them part of the colonial regular army. Their alliance to Spain was crucial for the Spanish army to make important progress in Hispaniola against the French, conquering important positions like Gonaïves, Gros-Morne, Plaisance, Acul, Limbé, Port-Margot, Borgne, Petit-Saint-Louis and Terre-Neuve.

Nevertheless, there had always existed a strong tension between Jean-François and Biassou that led to an armed confrontation in September 1793. Both generals confronted each other and the French took advantage of the instability within the black auxiliaries to re-conquer the Tannerie fort, recently occupied by Jean-François’ troops. That episode convinced the Dominican government of the necessity to put an end to the internal tension of the black army, which was achieved thanks to the intervention of the Dominican Brigadier Matías de Armona, who persuaded them to meet in Dondon and come to an agreement by late November 1793.

In the following weeks, the black auxiliaries achieved many other victories at the service of Spain, especially the conquest of Port Margot at the beginning in 1794, which earned them several golden and silver medals given by the Spanish Crown.

== Bayajá ==
The prestige of the black auxiliaries started to decay in July 1794, after the massacre of Bayajá. This place had been a French possession (Fort Dauphin) until the Spaniards conquered it in January 1794. At that moment, the authorities of the village asked the Spaniards to not let Jean-François’ troops enter the place in the future, because they were afraid that the latter would massacre them, provided that most of its inhabitants were the former owners of Jean-François’ collaborators, and also that one of the officers that surrendered the city to Spain was the mulato Candy, Jean-François’ former subordinate that had deserted to the French camp.

Despite the described circumstances, on July 7, 1794 Jean-François entered the place with his troops and massacred the French inhabitants, mostly, though many Spaniards died also in the episode. The Spanish garrison of the place did not interfere to stop the killing, for which they were criticised by other foreign governments that even accused Spain of supporting the killing from the shadow.

From that moment on, not only did the Spaniards realise that the black auxiliaries were dangerous, but they also prevented them from taking part in any other important campaign in the future, so that such abuses would not occur again.

== Basel and the diaspora of the auxiliaries ==
The Spaniards' awareness of the black auxiliaries' "natural savagery" as well as Santo Domingo's cession to France in the Peace Treaty of Basel, persuaded them to get rid of Jean-François and his troops, since the circumstances that had justified their alliance to the former slaves (Spain's plan to conquer the western part of Hispaniola) had failed.

First, Jean-François and his main collaborators were taken to Havana. But the Cuban governor, Luis de las Casas, was so afraid that their presence there would provoke a massive black insurrection in that island, that he pressured the Spanish government to throw them out of his colony.

In March 1796 they arrived to the Spanish city of Cádiz, where they were kept almost as prisoners. Their situation in that city was dramatic: the generals lost their military ranks and their right to any economic compensation after their retirement and, in addition, Jean-François had to use the few resources he had to assist his family and his companions.

In 1813, the Spanish Council of Regency decided to throw them out of that city and take them to the Coast of the Flies. Unfortunately, Jean-François never saw the resolution of the conflict that concerned his troops, as he had already died in the early days of the 19th Century, maybe in 1805, totally forgotten by the Spanish government, which “rewarded” him for his loyal services by denying any official link with him or any other slave general in the past.
