= Battle of Gonaïves =

Battle during the Haitian Revolution

- Part of the Haitian Revolution and the War of the First Coalition
Date	29 April–5 May 1794
Location	Gonaïves, Haiti
Result	French victory

Belligerents
France	Spain

Commanders and leaders
Toussaint Louverture	Villanova

Strength
4,000 men	Unknown

Casualties and losses
Unknown	Unknown

The Battle of Gonaïves took place during the Haitian Revolution.

== Battle ==
Following the abolition of slavery by the French Republic on February 4, 1794, Toussaint Louverture was persuaded to abandon the Spanish army to join the French Republicans. According to General Lavaux, Toussaint stopped fighting the Republicans on April 6 and rallied the Republic on May 6.

Toussaint asked the Spanish garrison of Saint-Raphaël to be supplied with weapons and ammunition, the thing done a few hours later he turned against his former allies, marched on Saint Raphaël and seized.

He then attacked the city of Gonaïves more strongly defended.

According to the testimony of a certain Pélage-Marie Duboys, the Spaniards capitulated but they were granted the honors of the war and they were able to retire.

The losses are not known, but 500 inhabitants of the city fled in front of the black troops and 150 inhabitants were killed.

The reversal of Toussaint made the Spaniards lose almost all their conquests in Saint-Domingue.

== Bibliography ==
- Bell, Madison Smartt (2007). Toussaint Louverture. Actes Sud.
- Schœlcher, Victor (1982) [1889]. Vie de Toussaint Louverture (in French). Éditions Karthala.
