= Matías de Armona =

Governor of The Californias

(Spain) Civil Governor of Las Californias
- In office June 12, 1769 – November 9, 1770
- Preceded by: Gaspar de Portolá
- Succeeded by: Felipe de Barri (civil in south) & Pedro Fages (military in north)

Personal details
- Born: Spain
- Profession: Politician

Matías de Armona also Don Matías de Armona was a governor of Las Californias, serving from June 12, 1769, to November 9, 1770, during Spanish Empire colonial rule of New Spain.

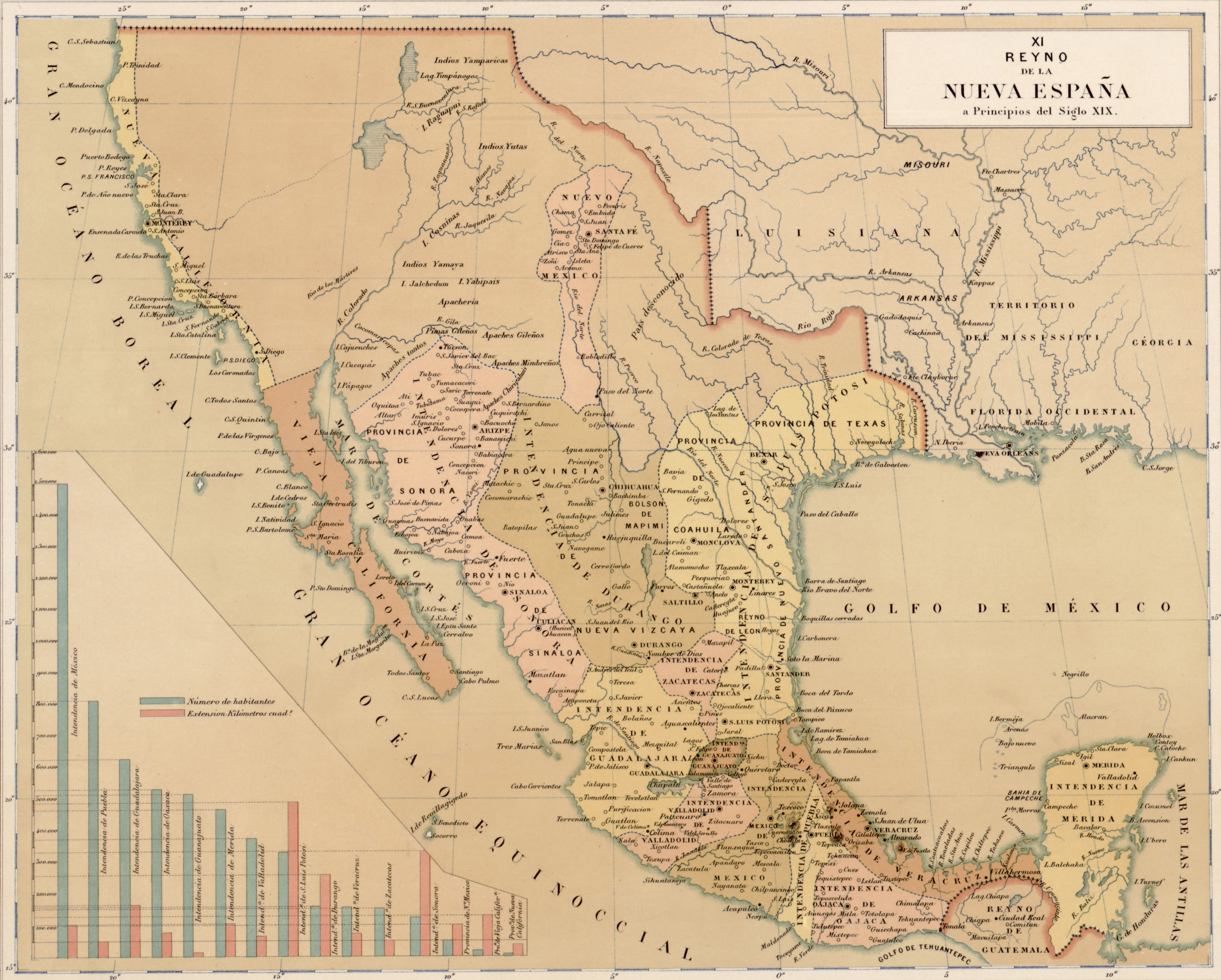
Map of New Spain, showing the Municipalities and provinces in the early 1800s

In order to obtain an improvement in tax collection without waiting for royal approval, Jose de Galvez, visitor-general to New Spain, appointed Matias de Armona governor of the settled areas of Las Californias, which at that time included only the lower two-thirds of the Baja California peninsula. The appointment also freed up the current governor Gaspar de Portolá to travel north as leader of the Portolá expedition, whose aim was to establish presidios (forts) at San Diego and Monterey. At the same time, Franciscan missionaries led by Junípero Serra established missions in those two places.

Matías de Armona arrived in Loreto in June 1769, from Spain, along with his brother Francisco de Armona. Armona's offices remained in the capital of Loreto, and he did not have much power in the new "Alta" (upper) California areas, even though he was technically the civil governor of all of Las Californias. There was as yet no "civil" to govern in the new settlements, just military and missionary - each of which governed their own affairs. When Portolá left Monterey in 1770, he appointed his 3rd-in-command Pedro Fages to be military governor of the new settlements. The military governor ruled from the Monterey Presidio, and Monterey became the new capital of Las Californias.

Armona did not have his heart in the new appointment as governor, a job he did not want. Shortly after arriving in Baja, he set out for Sonora to see visitor-general José de Gálvez, and remained absent from Loreto for a year. In that year, there were many troubles. There was small native revolt at Todos Santos.; also fever and measles outbreaks. José de Gálvez, on tour of the missions, had ordered such harsh punishment to the native neophytes that Armona had Loreto locked down at the news.

After his replacement as civil governor of the southern areas by Felipe de Barri, Armona departed Loreto on April 19, 1771. Upon his return to the central areas of New Spain, he made some recommendations that were put into place later: Missions were funded as promised; single male natives that traveled to learn a trade could return home after the training.

== See also ==
- Carlos Francisco de Croix, marqués de Croix
- Arizpe
