= Armistice of March 30, 1798 =

The armistice of March 30, 1798 allowed Toussaint Louverture to settle the details of the retreat of the British army from Saint Domingue, before the triumphal entry of the black general and his army of ex-slaves into Port-au-Prince on May 16, 1798. The aim of the armistice was the negotiations by which it was decided that the British would leave their last stronghold in the north of the country, Môle-Saint-Nicolas, on August 31, 1798.

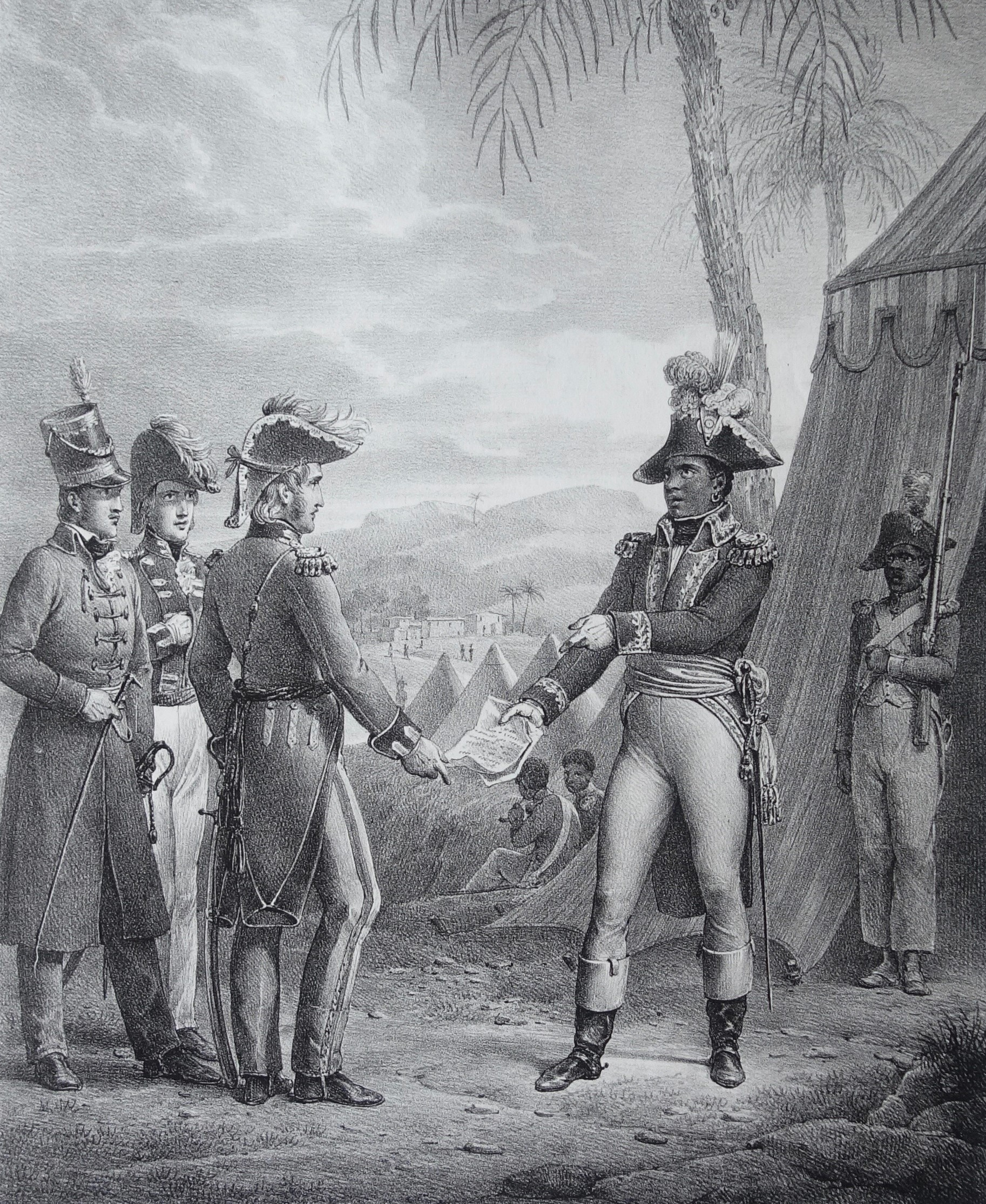
General Toussaint Louverture receives British general Thomas Maitland.

Five months later, to the day, as planned, on August 31, 1798, the British abandoned Saint-Domingue to the victory of Toussaint Louverture, who must however turn to another front, to the south, where the former French general André Rigaud gathered an army of mulattoes with the help of French planters to fight it.

The armistice put an end to a war of liberation which left more than 10,000 dead and lasted four years: since the February 19, 1793, and the Treaty of Whitehall, the British took advantage of the lucrative taxation on the sugar plantations of Santo Domingo, while since the May 5, 1794 Toussaint Louverture had launched an offensive.

The armistice was signed with the British general Thomas Maitland, only three days after the arrival, on March 27, 1798, of Hédouville, sent from the directory, which must leave on October 23 of the same year, which mission was to discreetly incite Toussaint Louverture to engage his army in the attack on Jamaica and the United States, which the latter will be careful not to perform, to avoid losing all credit and part of his army. On the contrary, the black general would approach Maitland to encourage him too to trade.

The armistice of March 30, 1798 was signed shortly after the arrival in early March 1798 of young general Thomas Maitland at the head of the British army, who was instructed to limit British losses, especially as the month of March 1798 saw a wave of desertions among black enlisted by the British troops, who lose more strong.

By mid 1798, the U.S. Secretary of State Timothy Pickering confirmed that the United States would accept the resumption of commercial relations in case of victory of Toussaint Louverture, became then very likely scenario, and in November 1798 Toussaint Louverture sent Joseph Bunuel meet the main merchants of Philadelphia to negotiate the resumption of business, while the American State has given itself the means to rebuild a navy of war, in order to remove the French installed in Cuba, among which Pierre and Jean Lafitte, who would feed the piracy of the 1800s in the Caribbean.

On June 13, 1799, Dr. Andrew Stevens, officially appointed consul general of the United States in April 1799, signed the tripartite commercial convention of 1799, establishing commercial relations between British, Americans and Haitians.

The arrival in Cuba of refugees from Saint Domingue after the armistice of March 30, 1798 saw many become privateers during the quasi-war, which gives a first boost to commercial traffic in Cuba as shown by the values produced by the port of Santiago de Cuba between 1797 and 1801, a part coming from the catches of the French corsairs attacking the American ships trading with Saint Domingue.

However, the armistice did not end the conflict within Saint Domingue, as André Rigaud would split with Louverture and initiate the War of Knives against him for control of the colony in June 1799 to July 1800, after which Rigaud fled to France and Louverture took command of the colony. Louverture would further consolidate control of the entire island by conquering the Spanish-ruled Captaincy General of Santo Domingo in December 1800 and abolishing chattel slavery throughout the island.
