= Padre Jean =

Padre Jean (or Padrejean) was a slave on the island of Hispaniola. In 1676, he attempted to overthrow his slavemaster and consequently form a revolution. This occurred in the town of Port-de-Paix. This is stated to have been the spark that led to the eventual Haitian Revolution. He freed slaves and fled to Tortuga Island. He lived there until 1679 when his location was discovered. After this the French sent some maroons who killed him.

== See also ==
- Slavery in Haiti
- Haitian Revolution
- Independence of Haiti
- Armée Indigène
- End of slavery in Haiti
- 1791 slave rebellion
