= Salcedo House & Kitchen (St. Augustine) =

- Salcedo House and Kitchen
- U.S. Historic district – Contributing property
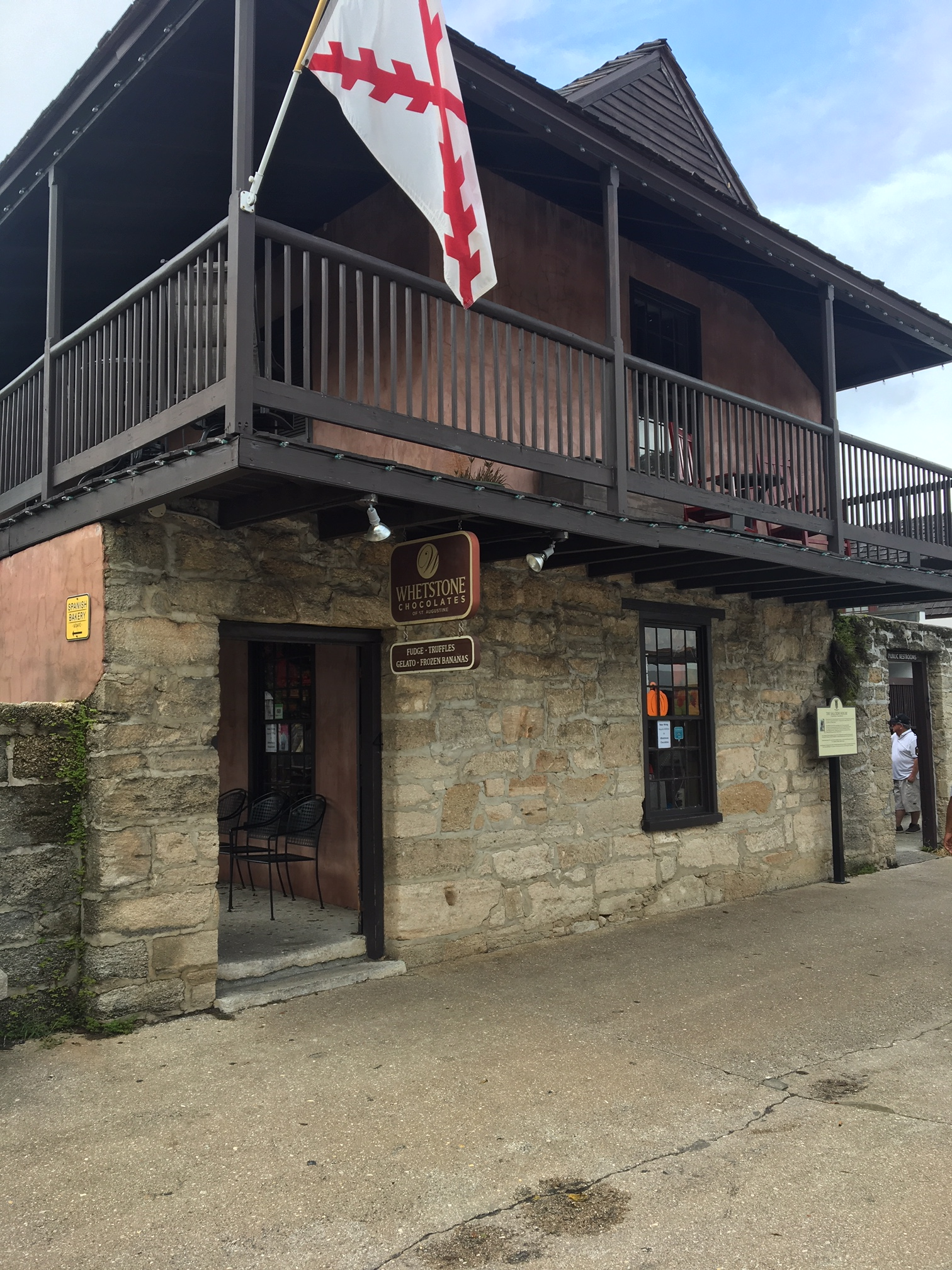
- Salcedo House, 2018

- Location within Florida
- Location: 42 St. George St; St. Augustine, Florida
- Coordinates: 29°54′54″N 81°18′44″W
- Built: 1962
- Architectural style: Spanish Colonial
- Part of: St. Augustine Town Plan Historic District (ID70000847)

The Salcedo House and Kitchen are located at 42 and 42 1/2 St. George Street, in St. Augustine, Florida. They are reconstructions of 18th-century structures that stood on these sites in St. Augustine's First Spanish Period (1565–1763).

== History ==
The Salcedo House was a dwelling constructed in St. Augustine's First Spanish Period (1565–1763). By the end of this period the house belonged to Alfonsa de Avero. Avero, her sisters living nearby, and their families left St. Augustine with other Spaniards when Florida was transferred to the British with the 1763 Treaty of Paris. During the British Period, Thomas Stone, Leonard Cecil, and Robert Johnston owned the property, consecutively. When Spain regained Florida with the 1783 Treaty of Paris, Pedro Jose Salcedo, Captain of the Royal Corps of Artillery, bought the lot.

From 1796 to 1801, general from the island of Santo Domingo and early leader of the Haitian Revolution Georges Biassou lived in this house. In 1805, Minorcan fisherman and farmer Pablo Sabate bought the house.

== Reconstruction ==
The Salcedo House & Kitchen are both reconstructed on their original foundations that were uncovered and examined during archaeological excavations in 1962. The project overall was the second reconstruction project undertaken by the St. Augustine Historical Restoration and Preservation Commission. The foundations of the Salcedo house were discovered by Dr. Hale Smith of Florida State University as he worked on the archaeological excavation of the Arrivas House. The lots of these properties have changed over time, complication the question of land acquisition and restoration.

Walls were built of coquina covered over with plaster. The roof is made of cedar shake shingles. The white-stuccoed kitchen was built to show where British occupants had added a kitchen to the existing property. One can see evidence of a standing kitchen in a 1788 Spanish map following Florida's British Period. Construction was completed by the Historic St. Augustine Preservation Board in 1965 and during the time of the living history museum San Agustín Antiguo, the Salcedo Kitchen served as a bakery.

The Salcedo Kitchen was a huge success, turning out orange, vanilla, almond, lemon, cinnamon, and rum cookies, along with turnovers and fresh bread. In the late 1960s Bessie Bargmon and Lizzie Murray were the bakers, turning out 280 of each cookie per day.

== Present Day ==
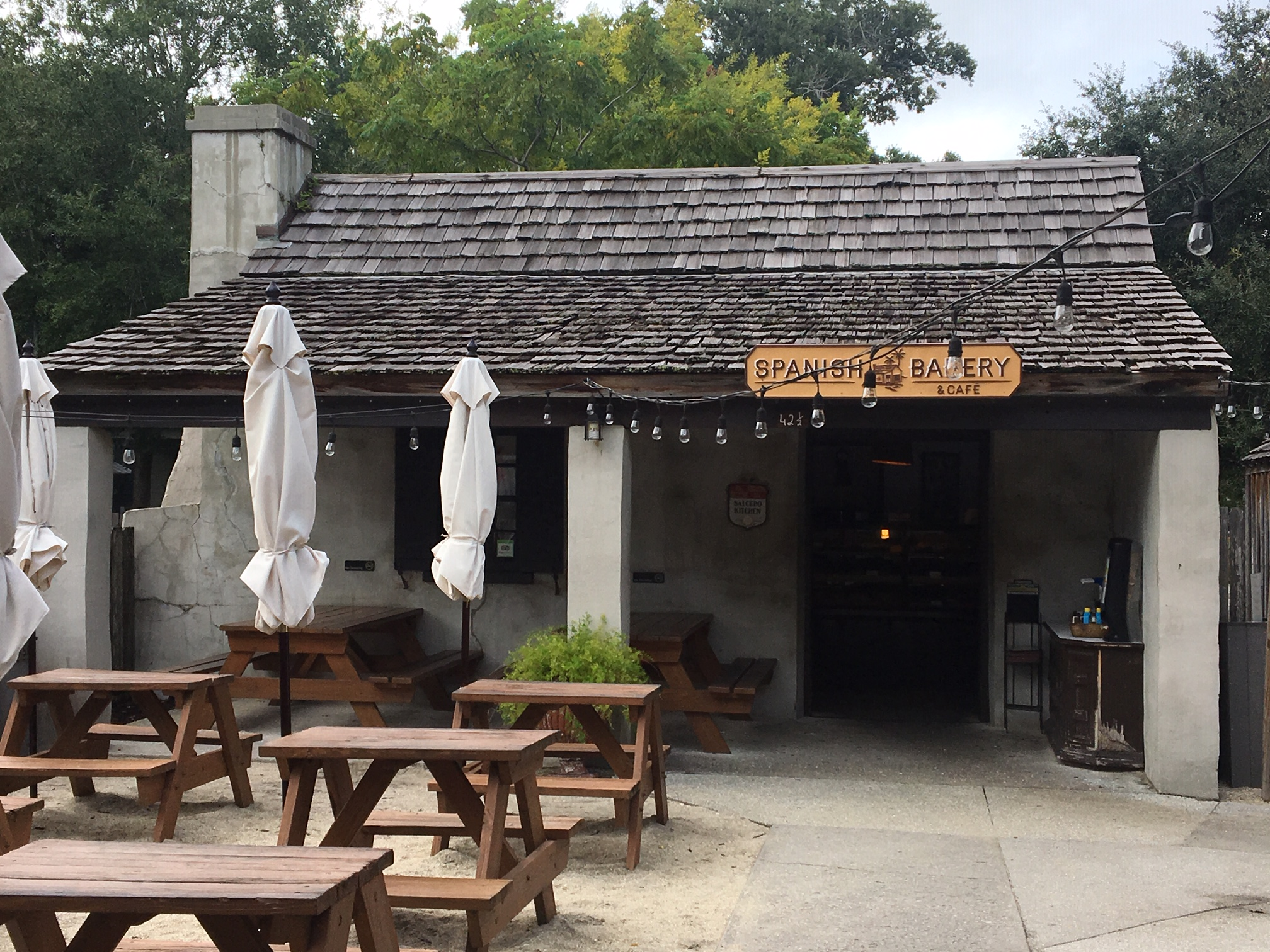
Salcedo Kitchen, 2018

Today the Salcedo Kitchen is the Spanish Bakery & Café. The Salcedo House is Whetstone Chocolates of St. Augustine. Both of these structures are owned by the State of Florida and managed on its behalf by University of Florida Historic St. Augustine.
