= Dondon =

Dondon Dondon
- Commune
- Location in Haiti
- Coordinates: 19°32′0″N 72°14′0″W
- Country: Haiti
- Department: Nord
- Arrondissement: Saint-Raphaël
- Elevation: 564 m (1,850 ft)

Population (7 August 2003)
  - Total: 25,846
  - Density: 0.386/km^{2} (1.00/sq mi)
- Time zone: UTC-05:00 (EST)
  - Summer (DST): UTC-04:00 (EDT)

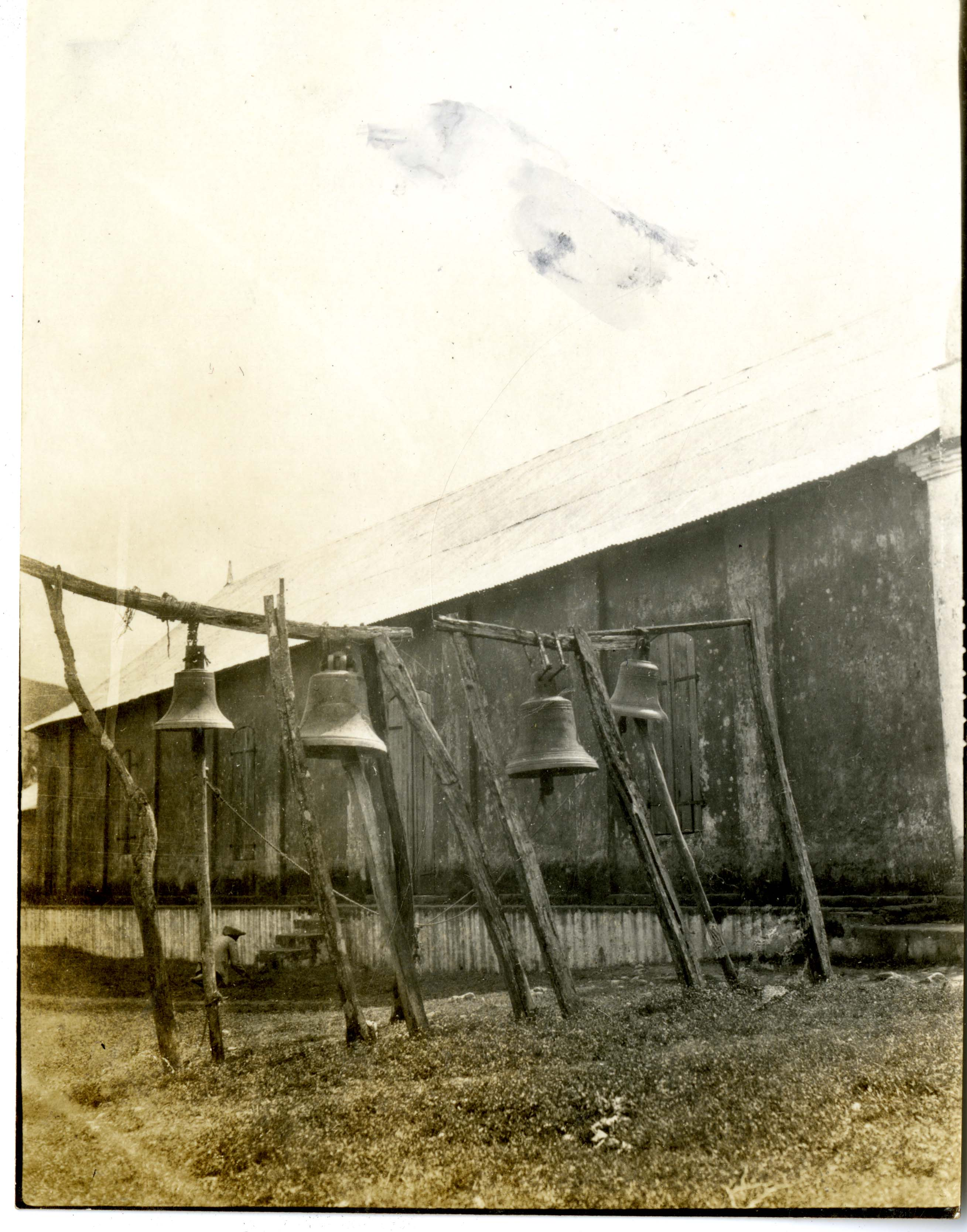

Dondon (Haitian Creole: Dondon) is a commune in the Saint-Raphaël Arrondissement, in the Nord department of Haiti. It has 25,846 inhabitants.

Dondon is nicknamed "the city of caves" with numerous natural caves in the surrounding mountains. The most famous is the voûte-à-Minguet.

== Notable people ==
- Louis Moreau-Lislet, jurist and translator
- Vincent Ogé, Merchant, military officer, goldsmith and revolutionary
