= Dutty Boukman =

18th-century African slave and priest; leader in the Haitian Revolution

- Born: c. 1767; Senegambia
- Died: 7 November 1791; Saint-Domingue
- Other name: Boukman Dutty
- Known for: Catalyst to the Haitian Revolution

Dutty Boukman (or Boukman Dutty; died 7 November 1791) was a leader of the Haitian Revolution. Born to a Muslim family in Senegambia (present-day Senegal and The Gambia), he was initially enslaved in Jamaica. He eventually ended up in Haiti, where he may have become a leader of the maroons and a vodou houngan (priest), however this claim only originated in modern sources.

According to some contemporary accounts, Boukman, alongside Cécile Fatiman, a Vodou mambo, presided over the religious ceremony at Bois Caïman, in August 1791, that served as the catalyst to the 1791 slave revolt which is usually considered the beginning of the Haitian Revolution.

Boukman was a key leader of the slave revolt in the Le Cap‑Français region in the north of the colony. He was killed by the French planters and colonial troops on 7 November 1791, just a few months after the beginning of the uprising.

== Background ==
In about 1767, Dutty Boukman was born in the region of Senegambia (present-day Senegal and Gambia), where he was a Muslim cleric. He was captured in Senegambia, and forced into slavery in the Caribbean, first to the island of Jamaica, then Saint-Domingue, modern-day Haiti, where he became a Haitian Vodou houngan priest. He was known to some of his followers as "Zamba" Boukman. After he attempted to teach other enslaved people how to read, he was sold to a French plantation owner and placed as a commandeur (slave driver) and, later, a coach driver.

During his time as a coach driver, Boukman was able to travel between plantations and estates. This allowed him to facilitate communication, learn political news, and encourage resistance factions among enslaved peoples. While working as a coach driver, Boukman met Jean-Jacques Dessalines, another enslaved person who helped inspire and lead resistance. Boukman and Dessalines were enslaved on plantations less than a mile apart and due to their assignments and skills had more privileges allowing greater movement than other enslaved workers. This allowed them to form strong bonds with one another which would ultimately help with their planned revolt. Boukman would later work with famous Haitian Revolutionary leaders Jeannot Bullet, Jean-François, and Georges Biassou to inspire and lead the 1791 slave revolt.

His French name came from his English nickname, "Book Man", which scholars like Sylviane Anna Diouf and Sylviane Kamara have interpreted as having Islamic origins; they note that the term "man of the book" is a synonym for a Muslim in many parts of the world. The name Dutty likely refers to the plantation where Boukman was enslaved, Dutih. Laurent Dubois argues that Boukman may have practiced a syncretic blend of traditional African religion and a form of Abrahamic religion.

== Ceremony at the Bois Caïman ==
Contemporaneous accounts place the ceremony at Bois Caïman on or about 14 August 1791 at the Choiseul plantation. Boukman and priestess Cécile Fatiman presided over the last of a series of meetings to organize a slave revolt for weeks in advance; the co-conspirators in attendance included Jean François, Biassou, Jeannot, and others. A black pig was sacrificed, an oath was taken, and Boukman gave the following speech:

...This God who made the sun, who brings us light from above, who raises the sea, and who makes the storm rumble. That God is there, do you understand? Hiding in a cloud, He watches us, he sees all that the whites do! The God of the whites pushes them to crime, but he wants us to do good deeds. But the God who is so good orders us to vengeance. He will direct our hands, and give us help. Throw away the image of the God of the whites who thirsts for our tears. Listen to the liberty that speaks in all our hearts.

— Dutty Boukman

The first primary source in the historical record referencing this speech comes from an account written by Hérard Dumesle in 1824, although it does not mention Boukman by name. Dumesle collected this account while traveling around Haiti and visiting the historical sites. While he did not include the names of those who gave him this account, it is very possible that he was able to talk with people who were at the meeting, although his writing is likely a dramatization, and includes references to Greek and Roman writings.

According to University of Gothenburg researcher Markel Thylefors, "The event of the Bois Caïman ceremony forms an important part of Haitian national identity as it relates to the very genesis of Haiti."

According to the Encyclopedia of African Religion, "Blood from the animal was given in a drink to the attendees to seal their fates in loyalty to the cause of liberation of Saint-Domingue." By drinking the blood, the attendees were making an oath that if broken would kill them. Scholars have linked this ceremony to traditional West African rituals, that enslaved people adapted for their cause. A week later, 1800 plantations had been destroyed and 1000 slaveholders killed. Boukman was not the first to attempt a slave uprising in Saint-Domingue, as he was preceded by others, such as Padrejean in 1676, and François Mackandal in 1757. However, his large size, warrior-like appearance, and fearsome temper made him an effective leader and helped spark the Haitian Revolution.

A second meeting, with similar intentions to the ceremony, occurred on the same night at Morne Rouge. This gathering of around two hundred enslaved people, mostly those with privileged assignments, was attended by both Jean-Jacques Dessalines and Dutty Boukman. During the meeting, a date was selected for the slave uprising along with other specifics. This information was disseminated among the plantations of the enslaved drivers and coachmen that attended.

== 1791 slave revolt ==
The night after the events of Bois Caïman, on Monday, August 22nd, Boukman gathered enslaved people from neighboring sugar plantations including the estates of Dutilh, Héron, and Noé. The enslaved people elected Boukman to act as their leader and commander. He led these forces to the Noé sugar refinery where they began their work of setting plantations ablaze as well as killing and capturing plantation owners and their families. Scholars mark the burning of the Noé estate as the beginning of the 1791 slave revolt that would lead into the Haitian Revolution.

The next night, Boukman led his group of rebels north to recruit more enslaved people from plantation and estates like Molines, Laplaigne, Sacanville, and Pillat. They then moved eastward and met up with other rebel fighters gathering a total force of around fifteen thousand strong. Together they marched to the city of le Cap to lay siege.

== Death ==
Boukman was killed by French soldiers in November 1791 while defending a rebel base at Fond Bleu. The French then publicly displayed his head in an attempt to dispel the aura of invincibility that he had cultivated. Below his head was the inscription, "The head of Boukman, leader of the rebels." Upon hearing the news of his death, slave leaders and rebels mourned his loss and held services to honor him. Some of the rebels demanded the execution of all white prisoners as retribution, but another formerly enslaved leader, Jean François, took control and prevented this.

== Legacy and references in popular culture ==
- The band Boukman Eksperyans was named after him.
- A fictionalized version of Boukman appears as the title character in American writer Guy Endore's novel Babouk, an anti-capitalist parable about the Haitian Revolution.
- He is mentioned in Victor Hugo's novel Bug-Jargal.
- Haitians honored Boukman by admitting him into the pantheon of loa (guiding spirits).
- The Boukman ("Bouckmann") uprising is retold in the Lance Horner book The Black Sun.
- "The Bookman" is one of several devil masquerade characters still performed in Trinidad Carnival.
- Haitian community activist Sanba Boukman, assassinated on 9 March 2012, took his name from Boukman.
- In the 2014 film Top Five, the main character, André Allen (played by Chris Rock), is in the midst of a promotional tour for a Boukman biopic called Uprize.
- In the Edwidge Danticat short story A Wall of Fire Rising, the character of Little Guy is cast as Boukman in his school play.
- KRS-One cites Boukman on his track, "Black, Black, Black"

== See also ==
- Bois Caïman
- Haitian Revolution
