= Georges Biassou =

Early leader of the Haitian Revolution (1741–1801)

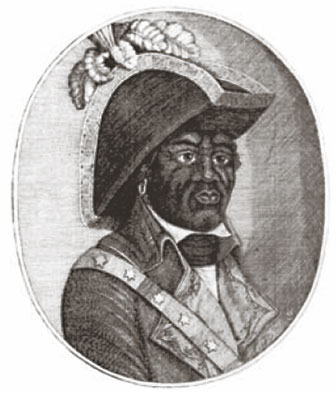
- 1806 drawing of Biassou by artist Juan López Cancelada
- Born: January 1, 1741; Saint-Domingue, Hispaniola (now Haiti)
- Died: July 14, 1801 (aged 60); San Agustin, New Spain (now St. Augustine, Florida, U.S.)
- Resting place: Tolomato Cemetery
- Other name: Jorge Biassou
- Citizenship: Spanish
- Years active: 1791–1795
- Known for: Leading the Saint-Domingue slave revolt, Spanish General
- Honours: Guard of Honour

Georges Biassou (French pronunciation: [ʒɔʁʒ bjasu]; 1 January 1741 – 14 July 1801) was an early leader of the 1791 slave rising in Saint-Domingue that began the Haitian Revolution. With Jean-François and Jeannot, he was prophesied by the vodou priest Dutty Boukman to lead the revolution.

Like some other slave leaders, he fought with the Spanish royalists against the French Revolutionary authorities in colonial Haiti. Defeated by his former ally Toussaint Louverture, who had allied with the French after they promised to free the slaves, Biassou remained in service to the Spanish Crown. He withdrew from Santo Domingo in 1795 and moved with his family to Florida, which was then part of the Spanish colony of Cuba.

In Florida, Biassou changed his first name to Jorge. Spanish leaders put him in charge of the black militia in Florida. He began to build alliances there when his brother-in-law married a fugitive from South Carolina. Florida had provided refuge for both planters and slaves during the American Revolution.

Georges Biassou was born in 1741 on the island of Hispaniola, as a slave on a sugar plantation in the French colony of Saint-Domingue, modern day Haiti. He was an early leader of the 1791 slave revolt in Saint-Domingue, in which he and his fellow leaders, Jean-François Papillon and Jeannot Bullet, killed the plantation owners to whom they were enslaved. This ultimately led to the Haitian Revolution (1791-1804). Biassou and Jean-François offered to cease the revolt, in exchange for emancipation, however France was preoccupied with multiple wars, and hence dismissed this proposal. In 1793, a war between France and Spain manifested in Hispaniola. Biassou and his fellow revolutionaries were requested to aid Spain in fighting against France in exchange for freedom, to which they agreed. France abolished slavery throughout its empire in 1794, however Biassou remained loyal to Spain.

In 1796, Biassou relocated to St. Augustine, Florida, where he became the general of the free black militia stationed at Fort Matanzas. He died there in 1801.

== Saint-Domingue ==
Hispaniola - Saint-Domingue on the western third, and Santo Domingo on the east.

Georges Biassou was born in 1741 in Saint-Domingue, Hispaniola. Hispaniola is an island which previously consisted of Saint-Domingue on the western third, and Santo Domingo on the east. Saint-Domingue is now recognised as the Republic of Haiti, and Santo Domingo as the Dominican Republic. The island lies in the Greater Antilles, a group of islands in the Caribbean Sea and part of the West Indies. Saint-Domingue was initially claimed by Spain, which later ceded the colony to France. France controlled Saint-Domingue from 1659 to 1804, and it became the most lucrative colony in the French colonial empire, as well as throughout the Caribbean.

Saint-Domingue was known as the "Pearl of the Antilles" for its resources, subsequent profitability and beauty. The economy hinged on slave plantations and their production of export crops. Enslaved Africans grew sugar in the northern plains around Cap Français, and coffee in the mountainous terrain. Biassou and his family laboured on a sugar plantation. By the 1780s, Saint-Domingue produced 40% of all sugar and 60% of all coffee in Europe, profiting the French government and further reinforcing its dominance. To maintain this economy, from 1786 onwards, approximately 40,000 slaves were annually imported into Saint-Domingue from Africa. The Saint-Domingue colony was regarded as one of the harshest, considering the high levels of violence and mortality. The plantation owners were notoriously brutal, often using whips for the punishment of their slaves, producing an unprecedented standard of violence.

=== Social structure ===
Saint-Domingue's population was stratified with a rigid caste system. The population was divided into three groups. White colonists, or 'les blancs' were of the highest rank. This group was subdivided into government officials and plantation owners, referred to as 'grandes blancs', and a lower class of whites, referred to as 'petits blancs', who were usually shopkeepers, artisans and labourers. Free persons of colour, or gens de couleur libres, were mulattoes who were decedents of white fathers and black mothers. They were relatively educated and were usually administrators on plantations, or in the army. Some even owned their own plantations and slaves. This stratum also included 'affranchis', who had been free for generations, owned property and enjoyed considerable rights. They were, however, excluded from positions in office and some occupations. Members of this stratum often identified more so with the whites, however still faced distinct social differentiation. African-born slaves, such as Biassou, ranked the lowest. In 1789, Saint-Domingue housed 500,000 slaves and 32,000 whites. This colonial stratification pattern laid the foundation of Haiti's present day class system.

=== Social conflict ===
White colonists and black slaves continually participated in violent conflict, many of which involved "maroons". Paul Fregosi, in his book Dreams of Empire: Napoleon and the First World war 1792-1815, emphases that each of the three social classes in Saint-Domingue despised one another.

In May 1791, the French government granted citizenship to wealthier emancipated slaves, often referred to as "affranchis". This caused uproar among the small European population of Saint-Domingue, who refused to treat them as equal. This, as well as generations of inequality and brutality, caused Biassou and other African slaves to become enraged.

July 1791 saw physical fights between Europeans and African slaves, and in August of the same year, a slave rebellion rose. Biassou attended the Vodou ceremony at Bois-Caiman where Vodou priest Dutty Boukman declared that Georges Biassou, Jean-François Papillon and Jeannot Bullet would lead the insurrection. Jean-François executed Jeannot early in the uprising due to his excessive violence and cruelty, particularly that he commanded a rebel camp in which he tortured and executed white prisoners.

== Haitian Revolution ==
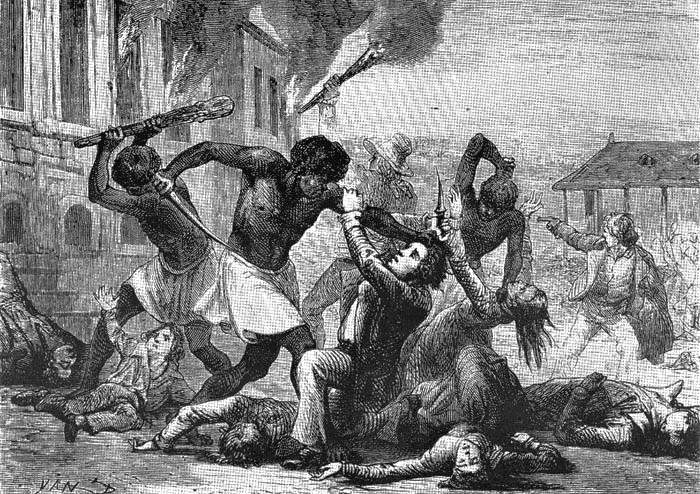
The Haitian Revolution - An illustration of the enslaved murdering white slave owners.

The Haitian Revolution was a series of conflicts which began on 22 August 1791 and ended on 1 January 1804. It involved Haitian slaves, "affranchis", "mulattoes", colonists, French royalist troops, French revolutionary forces, and the British and Spanish armies. The revolution was initially an insurrection against French imperial authority; however, it later became a battle of racial inequity, and then of slavery in general.

Thomas Madiou's Historie d'Haïti (English: History of Haiti) emphasises that within the first months of fighting, Biassou and Papillon became the most important insurgent leaders. Biassou commanded approximately 40,000 slaves to burn plantations and murder the "great whites". Biassou and Papillon proposed peace negotiations with France, offering to cease the revolt in exchange for emancipation. France was preoccupied, being at war with several monarchies and kingdoms, and hence dismissed this proposal. Concurrently, Biassou and Papillon developed informal contacts with Spain, which controlled Santo Domingo.

In 1793, France declared war on Spain, a war which eventually manifested in Hispaniola. Spain granted freedom to the revolutionaries in exchange for their assistance in battling France in Santo Domingo. A military organisation called the Black Auxiliaries of Charles IV was formed for the rebel leaders. Members included Georges Biassou, Jean-François Papillon, Toussaint Louverture and other rebels. The Black Auxiliaries were provided with weapons, supplies, and salaries. Biassou ultimately received Spanish citizenship, gold medals, and letters of recognition and confidence from the Spanish Government.

== Slave emancipation in Saint-Domingue ==
In 1792, abolitionist Léger Félicité Sonthonax was sent to Saint-Domingue from France to maintain order. He was titled the de facto ruler of Saint Domingue from September 1792 to 1795. Sonthonax also offered freedom to slaves who joined his army. In September and October 1793, slaves were emancipated throughout Saint-Domingue. Some insurgents, including Toussaint Louverture, withdrew from the Black Auxiliaries to return to Saint-Domingue and support the French.

=== Loyalty to Spain ===
Biassou and François remained loyal to Spain, despite that it meant they were to fight against their former ally, Louverture. Biassou and François both continued defending Spain until the war ended. Spain was grateful for this loyalty, however, as the war concluded, the Spanish government no longer knew what to do with its Haitian "wolves". The revolutionists were armed, skilled and former members of an army.

On February 4, 1794, all slaves were emancipated throughout all French colonies. This was enforced under an Act, and was ratified by the French National Convention. With the Treaty of Basel in 1795, Spain ceded Santo Domingo to France. Spain subsequently disbanded the Black Auxiliaries, meaning that its members, including Biassou, were to leave Hispaniola.

== St. Augustine ==
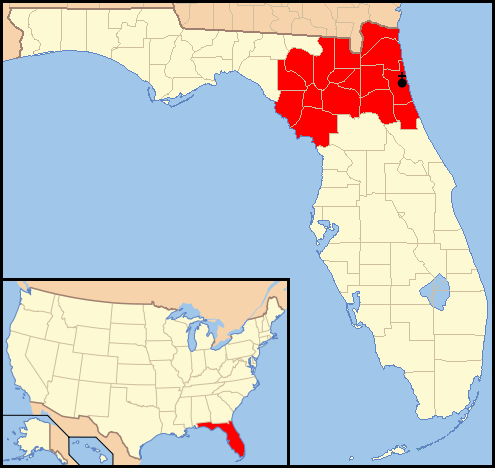
The diocese of St. Augustine, Florida.

In 1795, the Black Auxiliaries left Santo Domingo and headed to Cuba. However, Cuban officials feared that their presence would provoke slave movements in Cuba. Thus, the Black Auxiliaries were prohibited from entering. Instead, they sailed to St. Augustine, the capital of East Florida, which was also under Spanish control. St. Augustine had already enforced racial equality laws in 1792, thus providing refuge for emancipated slaves, and even former planters.

Upon Biassou's arrival, St. Augustine's governor, Juan Nepomuceno de Quesada y Barnuevo, provided two nights worth of dinner for him and his Haitian followers, who he considered family. Biassou changed his name to "Jorge" and was hereafter a free Spanish general. He was appointed leader of the Black militia of St. Augustine, which he commanded from Fort Matanzas.

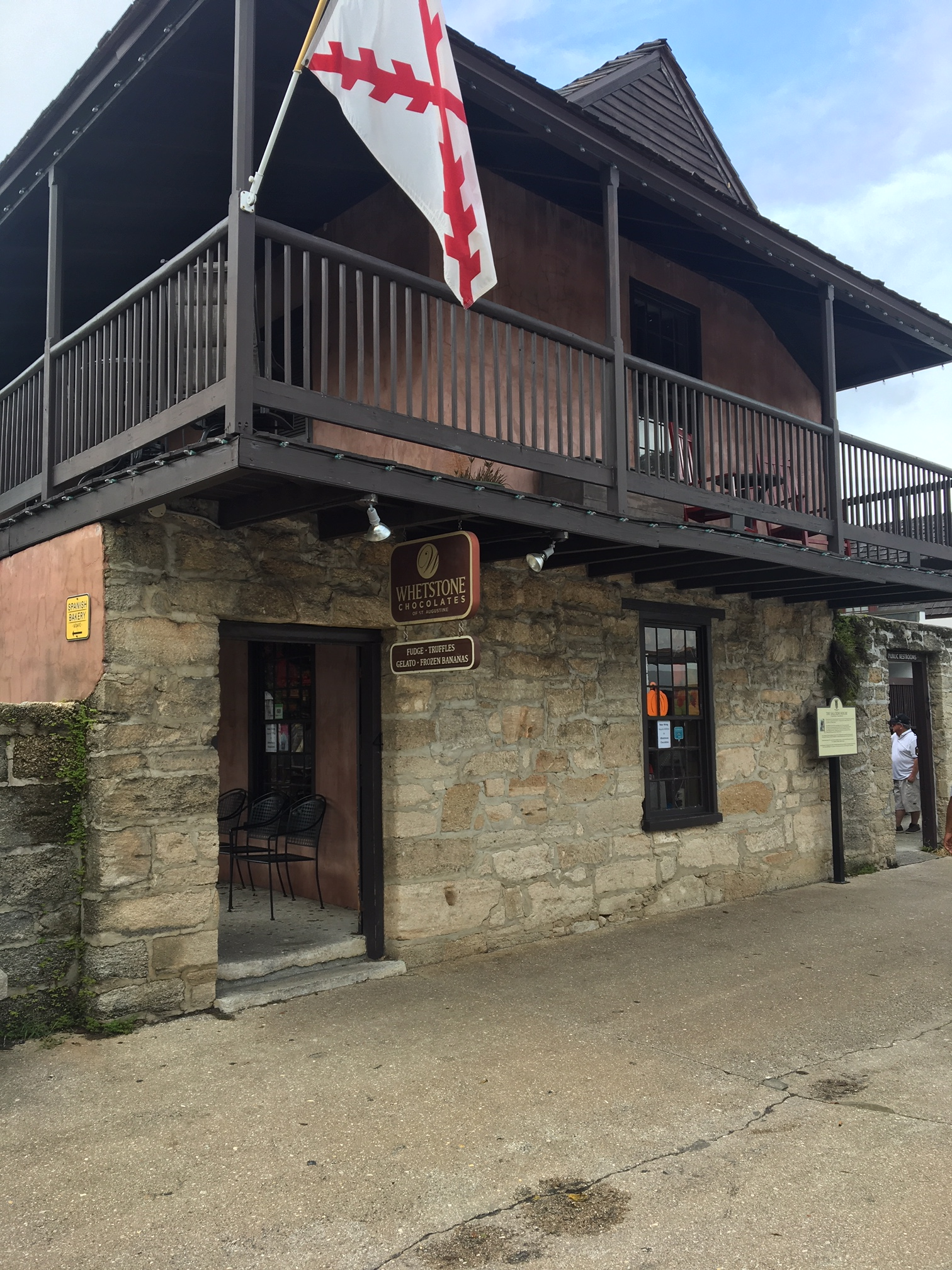
Salcedo House, St. Augustine. Pictured in 2018.

Although Biassou was largely perceived as a hero, the violence he caused in his pursuit of freedom was no secret. Considering this, colonists and administrators in Florida feared Biassou, worrying that he might encourage a slave revolt in Florida too. They were especially weary as there had been two slave uprising conspiracies in Pointe Coupée, Louisiana, which is relatively proximal to Florida. Despite this, Governor Quesada made an effort to maintain Biassou's image as a loyal soldier, rather than a rebel. Biassou wore gold-trimmed clothing and carried both a silver sabre and an ivory dagger.

=== Constitution of 1801 ===
Whilst Biassou settled in St. Augustine, Napoleon Bonaparte developed a new French constitution for all its colonies. Toussaint Louverture propagated the constitution on 7 July 1801, and established himself as governor of Hispaniola. Article 3 of the constitution states, "There cannot exist slaves, servitude is therein forever abolished. All men are born, live and die free and French."

=== Final years ===
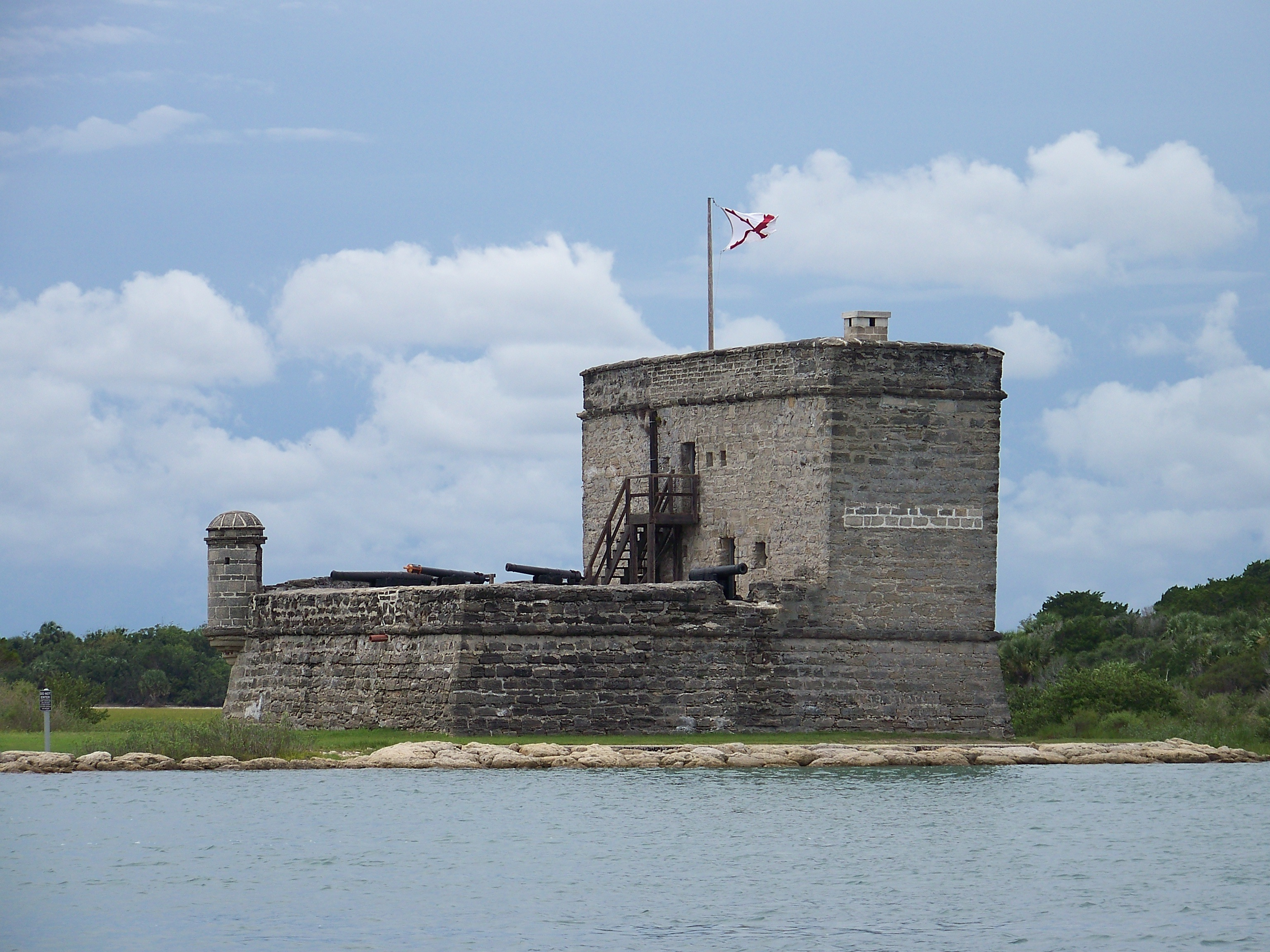
Fort Matanzas, St. Augustine. Pictured in 2012.

Biassou lived in the Salcedo House in St. Augustine. He bought a plantation, farmed by slaves of his own. He continued to serve Spain in his final years, defending Florida against attacks of the Seminole Indians. He had achieved 10 years of freedom before he died at age 60 on 14 July 1801, during a drunken brawl. He was honoured with a Catholic Mass and was buried at the Tolomato Cemetery. The exact location of his gravesite is unknown, as most grave markers were made of wood and have long since disappeared.

== Legacy ==
Biassou was commemorated as a Spanish officer and an honourable veteran, and was recognised with a Guard of Honour at his Funeral. On 1 January 1804, the island of Hispaniola was declared an independent state, divided into the Republic of Haiti and the Dominican Republic. Haiti is the only nation that has emerged from a successful slave rebellion in modern history. Haiti's independence exposed an interdependence between slave emancipation and the construction of a sovereign state, giving rise to issues such as the definition of citizenship and difficulties in laying political foundations.

Biassou's impact surpassed the domestic threshold and influenced world politics permanently. The Haitian revolution dictated the structure of international relations in the forthcoming 19th century with its defeat of the French colonial empire, and subsequent impact on Spain and England, who emerged weakened from the conflict and remained cautious for years to come.

In August 2009, the Haitian Ambassador to the United States, Raymond Joseph, visited St. Augustine to raise awareness for Haitian-American heritage. He visited Biassou's home, fort and cemetery, and placed a wreath in front of the chapel in Tolomato Cemetery in honour of Biassou. In 1798, Biassou also appeared as a fictional character in Jean-Baptiste Picquenard's novel, 'Adonis, ou le bon nègre, anecdote coloniale' (English: Adonis, or the good negro, colonial anecdote), in which he is depicted as a "cruel and bloodthirsty leader".

=== Witness accounts ===
A witness account titled The revolution of Saint-Domingue, containing everything that occurred in the French colony from the start of the revolution until the author's departure for France on 8 September 1792 was written by an anonymous author, who is only identified by the fact that he is a white male. He details his experiences of being a white prisoner, being held captive on the first night of the uprising, August 22, 1791. This account provides a vivid first-person perceptive.

Joseph Gros was one of Jeannot Bullet's white prisoners at his rebel camp. Gros also published an account, in which he states that Jeannot ordered for one prisoner to be tortured and executed every 24 hours, in order to "prolong his enjoyment". Bullet would be tried and executed for this by Biassou and Jean-François Papillon.

=== Contemporary scholarship ===
Biassou's life has been thoroughly studied by scholars and historians, such as Jane Landers, who has conducted research on Biassou and black society in Spanish Florida for decades. Her work provides most of what is known about Biassou.

Biassou is also figured as a character in Madison Smartt Bell's 1995 novel, All Souls Rising, the first book in his Haitian Revolutionary trilogy series. It attempts to present a historically accurate rendition of the Haitian Revolution. The novel illustrates vivid details that are not facts, per se, but are based on actual events. The book also graphically depicts the witness account of Joseph Gros. It was nominated for the 1996 PEN/Faulkner Award and a finalist for the 1996 US National Book Award. It also won the 1996 Anisfield-Wolf Award for best book of the year which dealt with matters of race.
