= Jeannot =

Haitian rebel slave leader in 1791

Jeannot (English: /ʒɑːˈnoʊ/ zhah-NOH, French: [ʒano]), was a leader of the 1791 slave rising that began the Haitian Revolution. With Biassou and Jean François, he was prophesied by Dutty Boukman to lead the revolution, and fought with the Spanish royalists against the French Revolutionary authorities in colonial Haiti.

He launched vicious attacks on whites and mulattoes, devising gruesome methods of putting them to death. Toussaint Louverture was sickened by his attitudes and actions. (Beard, p. 55)

"Small, thin man with a forbidding manner and a veiled crafty face. He was utterly remorseless... even towards his own kind. ... He would stop at nothing to gain his own ends, he was daring, seizing quickly on chances, quick-witted and capable of total hypocrisy. He feared no one and nothing; unfortunately he found inspiration in cruelty, a sadist without the refinements that so-called civilization brings." (Parkinson, p. 40) "He hanged those he had captured by hooks stuck under their chins. He himself put out their eyes with red-hot pincers. He cut the throat of a prisoner and lapped at the blood as it flowed, encouraging those around him to join him: "Ah, my friends, how good, how sweet is the blood of the whites. Drink it deep and swear revenge against our oppressors, never peace, never surrender, I swear by God." (Parkinson, p. 43-4).

Jeannot's brutality was not limited to whites and free blacks. He also targeted blacks whom he suspected of loyalty to the white slave owners. One rebel commander named Blin, who helped some white slave owners to reach safety, for example, was brutally executed for treason by Jeannot. A man named Gros, who was among a group of white prisoners in a rebel camp under Jeannot's command, left behind a written account of the period. According to Gros, Jeannot ordered the torture and execution of one of his captives every 24 hours 'to prolong his enjoyment'. Before the execution of Gros and the other remaining prisoners, however, a higher ranking rebel leader, Jean-François, arrived in the camp. Jeannot was subsequently arrested, placed on trial, and executed on the orders of Jean-François (Dubois, p. 112, 123).
