= Cécile Fatiman =

Haitian Vodou priestess and revolutionary leader

Mambo Cécile Fatiman

Personal life
- Born: Cécil Attiman; 18th century Saint-Domingue
- Died: 19th century (aged 112) Le Cap, Haiti
- Spouse: Jean-Louis Pierrot
- Children: Marie Louise Amélia Célestine
- Known for: Inciting the Haitian Revolution

Religious life
- Religion: Haitian Vodou

Cécile Fatiman (fl. 1791–1845) was a Haitian Vodou priestess and revolutionary. Born to an enslaved African woman and a Corsican prince, she lived her early life in slavery, before being drawn to Enlightenment ideals of "liberté, égalité, fraternité" and Haitian Vodou, which shaped her desire to end the institution of slavery in Haiti. Together with Dutty Boukman, she led a Vodou ceremony at Bois Caïman and incited fellow slaves to rise up against their enslavement, in an event that marked the beginning of the Haitian Revolution. She later married fellow revolutionary leader Jean-Louis Pierrot, with whom she had a daughter. She was reported to have lived a long life, dying at the age of 112.

== Biography ==
=== Early life and family ===
Cécile Fatiman was the daughter of an enslaved African woman and a Corsican prince; Haitian historian Rodney Salnave believed her father to have been a son of King Theodore of Corsica and that Fatiman's birth name was Cécil Attiman. Other hypotheses on her origins have been provided by various historians: Aisha Khan believed her to have been a Muslim and that her surname "Fatiman" was cognate with the given name Fatima; and Aimé Césaire believed her to be Kongolese, although David Patrick Geggus questions how in this version she would have had the name "Fatiman". She is also believed to have been related to Marie-Louise Coidavid, the future Queen of Haiti.

Described as a Mulatto with green eyes, from childhood, Fatiman and her mother were bought and sold as slaves. Her two brothers disappeared after they were separated from them and sold. Fatiman eventually obtained her freedom, either before or during the 1791 slave rebellion.

=== Revolution ===
According to Aisha K. Finch, Fatiman refashioned the Enlightenment ideals of "liberté, égalité, fraternité" for the Haitian context, upholding black women's bodily integrity and property rights. She also embraced Haitian Vodou, with its invocation of the Marassa Jumeaux, which caused fear among French colonists such as Médéric Louis Élie Moreau de Saint-Méry. She saw the body itself as a form of praxis, through which knowledge could be interpreted by entering an altered state of consciousness. To Fatiman, spirit possession was a marked contrast with slavery, as it allowed those who experienced it to, for a moment, become gods.

On the night of 21–22 August 1791, Fatiman presided over a ceremony at the Bois Caïman (English: Alligator Wood) in the role of manbo, together with Dutty Boukman as oungan. Within the dense forests of Northern Haiti and in the middle of a thunderstorm, they brought together 200 enslaved people from a number of nearby plantations and called on them to revolt against slavery. That night, Fatiman was said to have been possessed by one of the Èzili, believed to have been Dantò.

Fatiman then sacrificed a black pig, in an invocation of the lwa. Garvey F. Lundy understood this to be a Petwo rite of Vodou, which was later used by Haitians that resisted the United States occupation and the Duvalier dynasty. The attendees then drank the pig's blood and swore an oath: they would band together and kill the white slavers.

Fatiman proclaimed Boukman to be the commander-in-chief of this slave rebellion, and at her direction, the attendees dropped to their knees and swore to obey his orders. Aimé Césaire's version also has her leading the chant of "eh eh bomba". This ceremony ignited the Haitian Revolution, which culminated with the establishment of the independent State of Haiti. During the revolution, Fatiman and other manbos were credited with having provided "superhuman courage" to the revolutionaries.

=== Later life ===
Following the establishment of the Kingdom of Haiti by Henri Christophe, Fatiman married Jean-Louis Pierrot, a general in the Armed Forces of Haiti, and a prince under Christophe's monarchical regime. They had a child together, Marie Louise Amélia Célestine. After the couple divorced, Pierrot married Louisa Geneviève Coidavid, the sister of Queen Marie-Louise Coidavid. In 1845, Pierrot became President of the restored Republic of Haiti, with Coidavid as his first lady. His regime lasted for only 10 months.

Fatiman lived in Le Cap for the rest of her life, through which she kept in good health; she reportedly died at the age of 112.

== Legacy ==
=== Historiography ===
Although Fatiman entered the historical record through the reports of Antoine Dalmas, a plantation doctor who observed the ceremony she performed at Bois Caïman, little archival evidence exists of Fatiman's life, which has left significant gaps in her biography. Unconventional historical methodologies have therefore been used in order to assemble her personal story. Using a dialectical method, gaps in the archival record have been filled with diaspora literacy. For example, Étienne Charlier confirmed her presence in oral history of the revolution through interviews with descendants of the revolutionaries. Her participation in the Bois Caïman ceremony was confirmed in 19th century family records, provided by her grandson Pierre Benoit Rameau, a general who led Haitian resistance to the United States occupation of Haiti.

Despite her central role in the incitement of the Haitian Revolution, Fatiman is often missing from historical narratives of the period. In celebrations of male figures such as Boukman, Henri Christophe, Jean-Jacques Dessalines and Toussaint L'Ouverture, many women in the Haitian Revolution, including Fatiman herself, are often ignored entirely. Fatiman's own role in the revolution has been excluded from accounts by some historians, such as Jean Fouchard, who relied largely on colonial documents and tended to omit women from the historical record. Seeking to downplay the role of Vodou in the revolution, Léon-François Hoffman and Franck Sylvain even contested the existence of the Vodou ceremony at Bois Caïman. But historian Carolyn Fick was able to say with certainty that the Bois Caïman meeting was historically factual and confirmed that it had a Vodou character.

=== Popular culture ===
In C. L. R. James' 1934 play Toussaint Louverture: The Story of the Only Successful Slave Revolt in History, Fatiman was rewritten as the character Celestine, a vodou priestess that presided over the Bois Caïman ceremony. She also inspired the character Tante Rose, in Isabel Allende's 2009 novel Island Beneath the Sea. Fatiman appears in the animated series Castlevania: Nocturne, which takes place during the Haitian Revolution.

== Bibliography ==
- Colbert, Isaiah (17 January 2025). "Castlevania: Nocturne Writers Talk Religion, Revolution, and Black Representation". Gizmodo. Archived from the original on 17 January 2025.
- Dayan, Joan (1998) [1995]. Haiti, History, and the Gods. University of California Press. ISBN 0520213688.
- Fick, Carolyn E. (1990). The Making of Haiti: The Saint Domingue Revolution from Below. University of Tennessee Press. ISBN 0870496670.
- Finch, Aisha K. (2020). "Cécile Fatiman and Petra Carabalí, Late Eighteenth-Century Haiti and Mid-Nineteenth-Century Cuba". In Ball, Erica L.; Seijas, Tatiana; Snyder, Terri L. (eds.). As If She Were Free: A Collective Biography of Women and Emancipation in the Americas. Cambridge University Press. pp. 293–311. ISBN 9781108493406.
- Geggus, David Patrick (2002). Haitian Revolutionary Studies. Indiana University Press. ISBN 0253109264.
- Kingsbury, Kate; Chesnut, R. Andrew (2019). "In Her Own Image: Slave Women and the Re-imagining of the Polish Black Madonna as Ezili Dantò, the Fierce Female Lwa of Haitian Vodou". International Journal of Latin American Religions. 3: 212–232. doi:10.1007/s41603-019-00071-5.
- Lundy, Garvey F. (2009). "Fatiman, Cécila". In Asante, Molefi Kete; Mazama, Ama (eds.). Encyclopedia Of African Religion. SAGE Publications. ISBN 978-1-4129-3636-1.
- Pérez, Elizabeth (2021). "Hail to the chefs: Black women's pedagogy, sacred kitchenspaces, and Afro-Diasporic religions". In Hobson, Janell (ed.). The Routledge Companion to Black Women's Cultural Histories. Routledge. doi:10.4324/9780429243578-38. ISBN 9780429243578.
- Watkins, Angela Denise (2014). Mambos, Priestesses, and Goddesses: Spiritual Healing Through Vodou in Black Women's Narratives of Haiti and New Orleans (PhD). University of Iowa. doi:10.5840/jcr20214439.
