= Bois Caïman =

1791 ceremony in which the Haitian Revolution was planned

Coordinates: 19.723°N 72.273°W

Bois Caïman (French: Bois Caïman, lit. 'Gator Wood'; Bois 'Wood', Caïman 'Gator') was the site of the first major meeting of enslaved Africans during which the first major slave insurrection of the Haitian Revolution was planned. In the woods by nearby Le Cap in the French colony of Saint-Domingue, 200 enslaved Africans met, marking the beginning for the Haitian Revolution.

== Role during the Haitian Revolution ==
Before the Bois Caïman ceremony, Vodou rituals were seen as an event of social gathering where enslaved Africans had the ability to organize. These meetings and opportunities to organize were considered harmless by white slave owners; therefore, they were permitted. It is also argued that Vodou created a more homogeneous black culture in Haiti.

On the night of August 14, 1791, representative slaves from nearby plantations gathered to participate in a secret ceremony conducted in the woods by nearby Le Cap in the French colony of Saint-Domingue. The ceremony was presided over by Dutty Boukman, a prominent enslaved African leader and Houngan, and Cécile Fatiman, a mambo. A witness described the presence of 200 enslaved Africans at the event. The ceremony served as both a religious ritual and strategic meeting as enslaved Africans met and planned a revolt against their ruling white enslavers of the colony's wealthy Northern Plain. The ceremony is considered the official beginning of the Haitian Revolution.

Participants of the Bois Caïman ceremony were inspired to revolt against their white oppressors due to their promise to the mysterious woman who appeared during the ceremony. The African woman figure had declared Boukman the “Supreme Chief” of the rebellion. In the following days, the whole Northern Plain was in flames, as the revolutionaries fought against the whites who had enslaved them. To reduce the social disorder of the rebellion, the French captured Boukman and beheaded him. The French then displayed his head on Cap's square to prove his mortality and French power.

Clouded in mystery, many accounts of the catalytic ceremony and its particular details have varied. There are no known first-hand written accounts about what took place that night. It was first documented in the white colonist Antoine Dalmas's "History of the Saint-Domingue Revolution", published in 1814.

The Haitian writer Herard Dumesle visited the region and took oral testimonies in order to write his account of the ceremony. He recorded what is thought to be the earliest version of the Bois Caïman speech made by Dutty Boukman. Translated, it reads:

…This God who made the sun, who brings us light from above, who raises the sea, and who makes the storm rumble. That God is there, do you understand? Hiding in a cloud, He watches us, he sees all that the whites do! The God of the whites pushes them to crime, but he wants us to do good deeds. But the God who is so good orders us to vengeance. He will direct our hands, and give us help. Throw away the image of the God of the whites who thirsts for our tears. Listen to the liberty that speaks in all our hearts.

This excerpt from the official "History of Haiti and the Haitian Revolution" serves as a general summary of the ceremonial events that occurred:

A man named Boukman, another houngan, organized on August 24, 1791, a meeting with the slaves in the mountains of the North. This meeting took the form of a Voodoo ceremony in the Bois Caïman in the northern mountains of the island. It was raining and the sky was raging with clouds; the slaves then started confessing their resentment of their condition. A woman started dancing languorously in the crowd, taken by the spirits of the loas. With a knife in her hand, she cut the throat of a pig and distributed the blood to all the participants of the meeting who swore to kill all the whites on the island.

Despite purported facts and embellishments that have dramatized the ceremony over the centuries, the most reoccurring anecdote is the sacrifice of a black Creole pig to Ezili Dantor by the mambo Cécile Fatiman and the pact formed through its blood. Dalmas provided the very first written account of the sacrifice:

A black pig, surrounded by the slaves believe to have magical powers, each carrying the most bizarre offering, was offered as a sacrifice to the all-powerful spirit...The religious community in which the nègres slit its throat, the greed with which they have believed to have marked themselves on the forehead with its blood, the importance that they attached to owning some of its bristles which they believed would make them invincible.

Critics offers the theory that the ceremony never occurred at all. Dr. Léon-François Hoffmann theorizes that the event simply had motivational and unitary roles to politically gather allies throughout Haiti. Where Hoffmann found the narrative to have a strong impact on shaping the motivations of those involved in the revolution, Hoffmann feels there is no factual bias for the event occurring.

The black Creole pig was a sacrifice to and a symbol of Ezili Dantor, the mother of Haiti (who resembles the scarred Dahomey Amazons or Mino, meaning 'Our Mothers' in the Fon language). It was a mixing of the traditions of the army of the Dahomey, which was the ethnicity of many of the enslaved Africans in Saint Domingue with the Taíno, who had fled to the high mountains of Haiti (Haiti meaning high mountains in Taíno) in order to escape the Spanish.

== Significance and legacy ==
The Bois Caïman ceremony has often been used as a source of inspiration to nationalists and as a symbol of resistance to oppression.

In pop culture, Bois Caïman has been referenced in music and other artistic works as a symbol of resistance and unity. In the 1970s, roots music has referred to the Bois Caïman event as a parallel to resisting the Duvalier totalitarian regime like their ancestors.

Due to the influx of American Protestants in Haiti during the 1990s, some neo-evangelical Christians recontextualized the events at Bois Caïman as a Haitian "blood pact with Satan". They were influenced by spiritual warfare theology and concerned that the Aristide government had made efforts to incorporate the Vodou sector more fully into the political process. These Evangelicals developed a reinterpretation of the official national story. In this narrative, the ancestral spirits at the Vodou cemetery were seen as demons. In their view, the engagement with demons amounted to a pact that put Haiti under the rule of Satan. While some Haitian Evangelicals subscribe to this idea, most Haitian nationalists vehemently oppose it. This belief was referenced by Christian media personality Pat Robertson in his controversial comments during the aftermath of the 2010 Haiti earthquake. Robertson declared the Haitian people "have been cursed by one thing after the other" since the 18th century after swearing "a pact to the devil". Robertson's comments were denounced.

== Sources ==
- Haitian Bicentennial Committee
- The Bois Caiman Ceremony: Fact or Myth
- The Boukman Rebellion
