= Manbo (Vodou) =

Female priest in Haitian Vodou

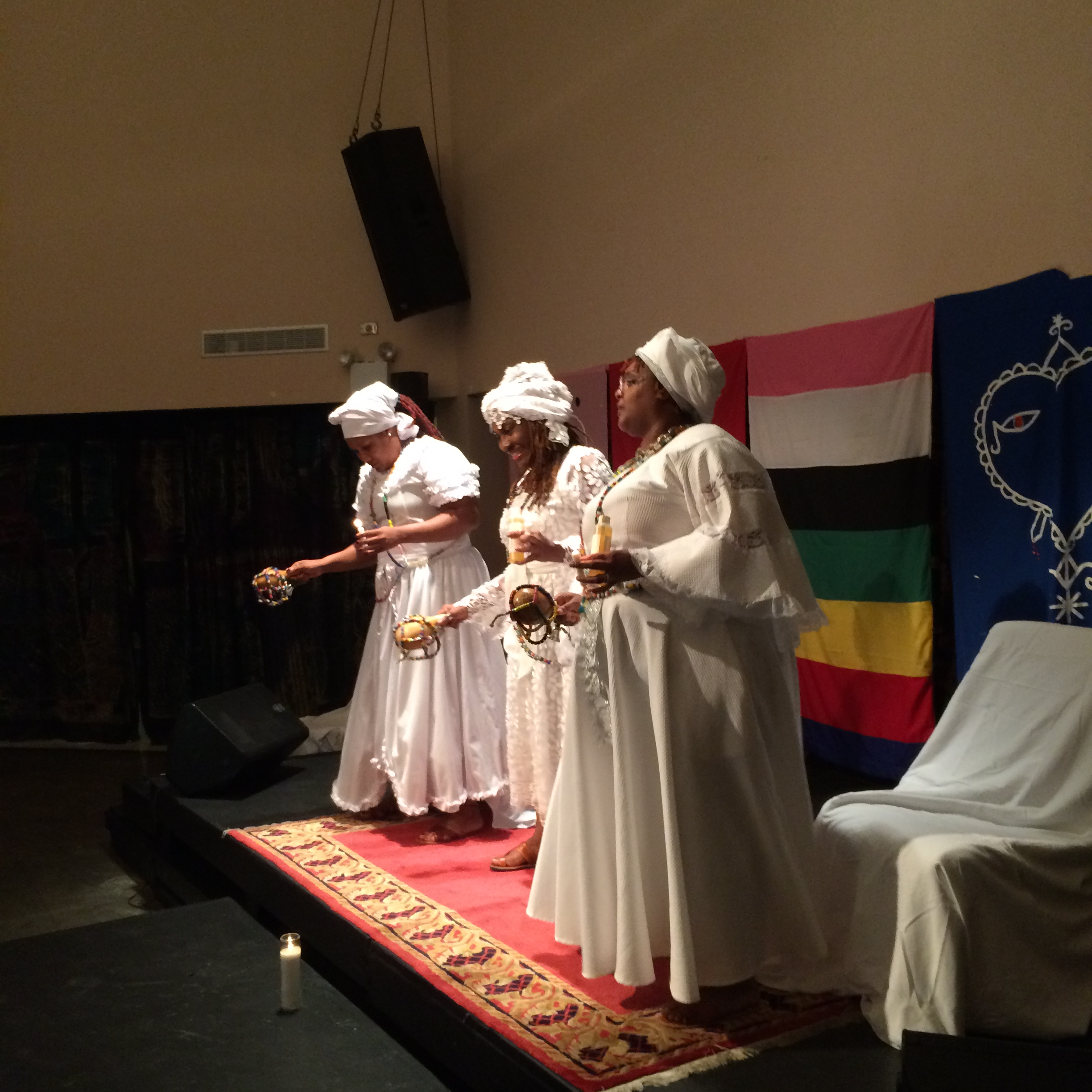
Three Haitian manbos in a Vodou swearing-in ceremony by the Konfederasyon Nasyonal Vodouyizan Ayisyen (KNVA) in Harlem, New York City.

A manbo (also written as mambo) is a priestess (as opposed to a oungan, a male priest) in the Haitian Vodou religion. Haitian Vodou's conceptions of priesthood stem from the religious traditions of enslaved people from Dahomey, in what is today Benin. For instance, the term manbo derives from the Fon word nanbo ("mother of magic"). Like their West African counterparts, Haitian manbos are female leaders in Vodou temples who perform healing work and guide others during complex rituals. This form of female leadership is prevalent in urban centers such as Port-au-Prince (the capital of Haiti). Typically, there is no hierarchy among manbos and oungans. These priestesses and priests serve as the heads of autonomous religious groups and exert their authority over the devotees or spiritual servants in their hounfo (temples).

Manbos and oungans are called into power via spirit possession or the revelations in a dream. They become qualified after completing several initiation rituals and technical training exercises where they learn the Vodou spirits by their names, attributes, and symbols. The first step in initiation is lave tèt (head washing), which is aimed at the spirits housed in an individual's head. The second step is known as kouche (to lie down), which is when the initiate enters a period of seclusion. Typically, the final step is the possession of the ason (sacred rattle), which enables the manbos or oungans to begin their work. One of the main goals of Vodou initiation ceremonies is to strengthen the manbo's konesans (knowledge), which determines priestly power.

The specific skills and knowledge gained by manbos enable them to mediate between the physical and spiritual realms. They use this information to call upon the spirits through song, dance, prayer, offerings, and/or the drawing of vèvès (spiritual symbols). During these rituals, manbos may either be possessed by a loa (also spelled lwa, Vodou spirits) themselves, or may oversee the possession of other devotees. Spirit possession plays an important role in Vodou because it establishes a connection between human beings and the Vodou deities or spirits. Although loas can "mount" whomever they choose, those outside the Vodou priesthood do not have the skills to communicate directly with the spirits or gods. This is because the human body is merely flesh, which the spirits can borrow to reveal themselves via possession. Manbos, however, can speak to and hear from the Vodou spirits. As a result, they can interpret the advice or warnings sent by a spirit to specific individuals or communities.

Cécile Fatiman is a Haitian manbo famously known for sacrificing a black pig in the August 1791 Vodou ceremony at Bois Caïman—an act that is said to have ignited the Haitian Revolution. There are also notable manbos within the United States. Marie Laveau (1801-1888), for example, gained fame in New Orleans, Louisiana, for her personal charm and Louisiana Voodoo practices. Renowned as Louisiana's "voodoo queen", Laveau's legacy is kept alive in American popular culture (e.g., the television series American Horror Story: Coven). Mama Lola is another prominent manbo and Vodou spiritual leader in the United States. She rose to fame after the publication of Karen McCarthy Brown's ethnographic account Mama Lola: A Vodou Priestess in Brooklyn. Mama Lola's success provided her with a platform to challenge Western misconceptions of Haitian Vodou and make television appearances.

== Etymology and history ==
Haitian Vodou gains its historic roots from the former West African kingdom of Dahomey, which Europeans also called the "Bight of Benin". Populated by the Fon, Ewe, and Yoruba people, this region covers roughly what is known today as Benin and western Nigeria. During the slave trade, many Fon and Ewe-speaking Dahomeyans were enslaved and used as the labor force for the sugar industry of French Saint Domingue (modern-day Haiti). As a result, Vodou has elements that can be traced back to the Fon people. For instance, the term manbo stems from the Fon term nanbo, which means "mother of magic". Like the nanbo in West African Vodun, Haitian manbos play a vital role in Vodou temples and rituals.

Contact with deities or spirits is considered dangerous. For this reason, many West African religions require male and/or female professionals (priests, priestesses, diviners, herbalists, etc.) who know the rituals, dances, songs, and objects that can be used to approach deities or spirits without upsetting them. Enslaved Africans brought these gendered notions of religious leadership with them to the New World. As a result, female religious figures are part of the religions of the African Diaspora (e.g., manbos in Haitian Vodou). The dominance of Vodou female practitioners later became prevalent in the urban contexts of Haiti and nineteenth-century New Orleans in French Louisiana.

== Vodou priesthood ==
Generally, manbos and oungans serve as the heads of autonomous Vodou religious groups—rather than clerical hierarchies—and exert their authority over the devotees or spiritual servants in their temples. They are said to have the ability to call upon deities or spirits to remove barriers between the spiritual and the earthly realms. Before they can put these skills into practice, these priests and priestesses receive a technical education wherein they learn about the different Vodou spirits and ritualistic practices. They must also cultivate a konesans (knowledge)—typically regarded as intuition, psychic power, or the "gift of eyes". Stemming from supernatural gifts, a konesans affords Vodou priests and priestesses the ability to read people and heal them. This, in turn, allows them to diagnose and treat human sufferings, which they ascribe to the living, the dead, or the spirit world.

The Vodou spirits choose manbos and oungans either through revelations in a dream or the utterances of a possessed person. These candidates for priesthood are then taken under the wing of a manbo or oungan for days, months or even years. Although anyone can receive the call from the spirits to enter the priesthood, the oungan and manbo profession is oftentimes hereditary. Nevertheless, those called to be a manbo or oungan will rarely refuse the position in fear of being severely punished by the gods.

In a humfo (Vodou temple), manbos and oungans are commonly referred to as manman (mother) and papa (father) respectively. Hounfos are highly decorated religious places of worship and contain one or more stone altars for deities or spirits. Some priests or priestesses draw large followings in their hounfo, which aid them in establishing notable reputations. Thus, with the office of the oungan or manbo comes power, prestige, and wealth. There are, however, other positions and roles meant to help a head priest or priestess. For instance, hunsi are devotees who have gone through the rite of fire, abide by the orders of the manbo and are qualified to assist with ritual activities. The hunsi are further subdivided based on particular tasks (e.g., the hungenikon (song leader) and laplace (master of ceremonies and sword holder)).

Patriarchal structures with male priesthood often prevail in rural areas of Haiti. Female leadership, on the other hand, is often seen in urban centers such as Port-au-Prince (the capital of Haiti). The autonomous nature of the Vodou priesthood enables manbos to exercise leadership entirely independent of male control. Despite providing female practitioners with greater social mobility, Vodou still mirrors aspects of misogyny in Haitian culture. For instance, oungans are more prone to undergo scrutiny for the mistreatment of female hunsi in their temples.

== Initiation rituals ==
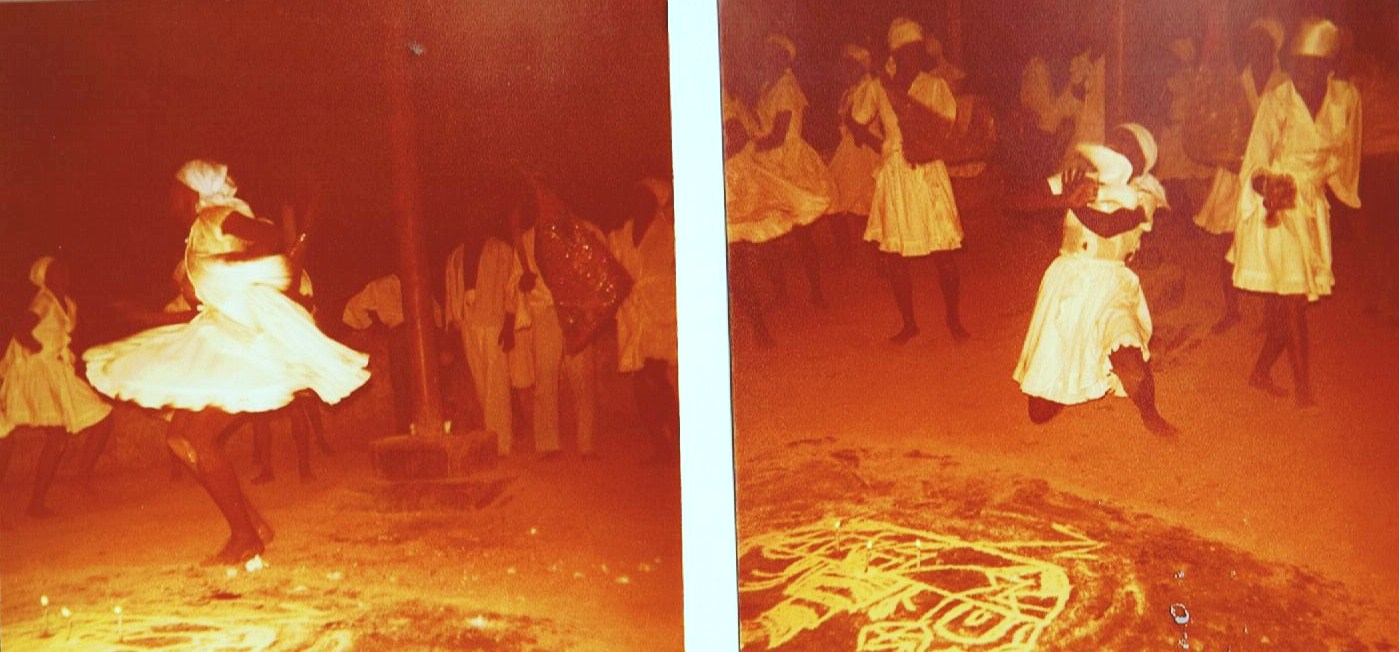
Scenes from a Vodou ritual in Haiti, depicting the bodily movement of a female Vodou practitioner.

Manbos must undergo a multi-step initiation process to enter the priesthood and establish their communication with the Vodou spirits. One of the main goals of Vodou initiation ceremonies is to strengthen the manbo's konesans. The first step in initiation is lave tèt (head washing), which is aimed at the spirits housed in an individual's head. It is believed that the head contains the gwo bonanj (big guardian angel)—a spirit that directs a person's consciousness and provides ancestral/spiritual wisdom. An agitated gwo bonanj can cause an individual to lose their insight and understanding. Head washing works to circumvent this issue by "refreshing" these restive head spirits.

Kanzo, a trial by fire, is the second step of initiation. During this rite of passage, hot materials from boiling pots are pressed into the initiate's left hand and left foot. This step is used to purify the initiate and transform their suffering into power. The kanzo ritual is important because it places the initiate under the direct care of a loa (also spelled lwa, Vodou spirits).

The next step is known as kouche (to lie down), which is when the initiate enters a period of seclusion. The future manbo is locked in the djévò (initiation room) for nine days with an ason. The ason is a beaded rattle that manbos and oungans use in Southern Haiti to give them leverage in the spirit realm. The final step of initiation is the transferred ownership of the ason to the manbo or oungan in training. Possession of the ason enables the initiates to take on their formal roles and start their healing work.

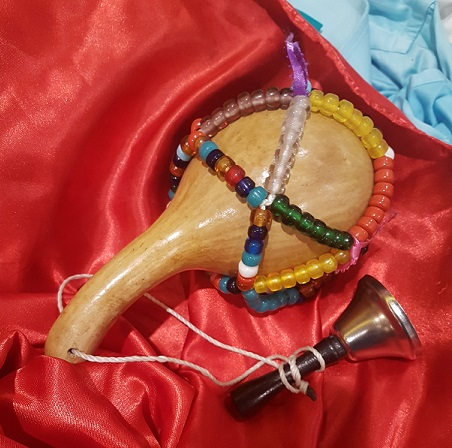
An ason, the beaded rattle used by oungans and manbos in the ason lineages.

There are different reasons as why Vodou practitioners perform rituals and ceremonies. Some believers view their relationship with the gods and spirits as a binding contract in which humans are obliged to provide the spirits rituals or ceremonies in exchange for protection. By serving and communicating with the spirits via rituals, devotees can bring about good luck, ward off evil, and heal the sick. As religious specialists, manbos know the Vodou spirits by their names, attributes, and symbols. They utilize this information during rituals to call upon the spirits and interact with them—whether it be through song, dance, prayer, offerings, or the drawing of vèvès (spiritual symbols). Theatrical aspects such as drumming, singing, and dancing are used by manbos as a means of "heating up" the process through which a person enters a state of possession or trance.

During rituals, manbos may either be possessed by a loa themselves, or may oversee the possession of other devotees. Spirit possession is one of the most important goals in Vodou rituals because it puts human beings in direct contact with the spirits. During possession, an individual's consciousness and sense of control leaves their body, which increases mental and corporeal reception of the spirits. The possessed individual becomes a vessel for the spirit to reveal its persona and cosmic knowledge. This is important because Vodou spirits can offer advice, healing, or even warnings to the individuals in a place of worship. Although loa can incarnate themselves in whomever they choose, the intimacy afforded to the devotees does not include a direct communication with the spirits or gods. This is because the human body is merely flesh, which the spirits can borrow to reveal themselves via possession. manbos, however, have the knowledge and training necessary to speak to and hear from the Vodou spirits. Since human contact with the spiritual realm can be a dangerous endeavor, manbos use their skills to supervise possessions and actively direct individuals back to consciousness.

== Notable manbos and popular culture ==
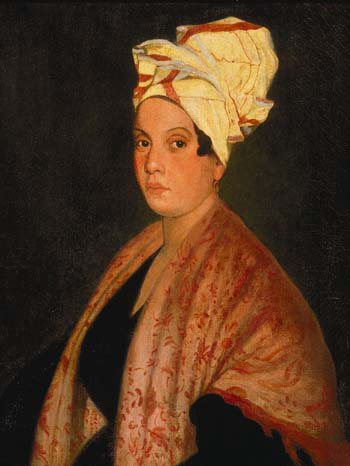
A portrait of an unknown Creole woman previously identified incorrectly as New Orleans Voodoo priestess Marie Laveau.

Cécile Fatiman is famously known for her participation in the August 1791 Vodou ceremony at Bois Caïman, which is considered to be a catalyst for the Haitian Revolution. This historical Vodou priestess inspired the first act of the uprising by sacrificing a black pig and sharing the blood with other slaves. Following the ceremony at Bois Caïman, a slave revolt began on August 21, 1791, resulting in the destruction of plantations surrounding Cap Français (modern-day Cap Haitien) and the deaths of thousands of French men, women and children.

Another notable manbo was Marie Laveau (1801–1888), a Louisiana Creole woman who became a legendary Voodoo practitioner in New Orleans. Like its Haitian counterpart, New Orleans Voodoo was brought by enslaved Africans from West Africa to French Louisiana during the slave trade. Contrary to popular belief, Haitian Vodou and Louisiana Voodoo are not the same—these African diaspora religions have their own history and identity. From its beginning, female practitioners played a dominant role in New Orleans Voodoo. Approximately eighty percent of Voodoo leaders were said to be women during Laveau's time. Laveau herself gained great fame for her personal charm and Voodoo practices. Today, she is still renowned as Louisiana's "voodoo queen". Her legacy and image as a Voodoo practitioner lives on in modern-day popular culture. For instance, a fictionalized Marie Laveau (played by actress Angela Bassett) appears in the third season of American Horror Story.

Marie Thérèse Alourdes Macena Champagne Lovinski, also known as Mama Lola (1933–2020), was a prominent manbo and Vodou spiritual leader in the United States born and raised in Haiti. She rose to public prominence after the publication of Karen McCarthy Brown's ethnographic account, Mama Lola: A Vodou Priestess in Brooklyn. In 1963, at the age of thirty years old, Mama Lola emigrated to Brooklyn, New York, in search of greater opportunities. During one of her visits back to Haiti, the warrior spirit Ogou possessed Mama Lola's mother Philomise Macena and revealed to Mama Lola that the spirits wished that she fulfill her calling into the Vodou priesthood. She underwent a series of rituals in Haiti over multiple visits to complete this high level of initiation. Brown explains that her role as a practicing manbo was one that "combines the skills of a medical doctor, a psychotherapist, a social worker, and a priest". Mama Lola conducted most of her spiritual work in Brooklyn, played an active role in her hometown through visits and material support, and performed rituals and healing work throughout the eastern United States, Canada, elsewhere in the Caribbean, and Benin. Her greater visibility after the publication of Mama Lola: A Vodou Priestess in Brooklyn and growing participation in the public sphere provided her with a platform to reshape American perceptions of Vodou, achieve greater recognition in New York's Haitian community, and attract the attention of people unfamiliar with Haiti and Vodou. One of her appearances in U.S. popular media included that as a 2007 guest on Season 2 Episode 7 ("Mama Lola Knows Best") of the reality TV show Tori & Dean: Home Sweet Hollywood.
