= VèVè Clark =

American academic (1944–2007)

VèVè Amasasa Clark (December 14, 1944 – December 1, 2007) was an author and scholar who coined the phrase "diaspora literacy". She was a professor of African American Studies at the University of California, Berkeley from 1991 until her death in 2007.

== Early life and education ==
Clark was born in Jamaica, Queens, New York City, the only child of a Caribbean-born mother, Pauline Kirton, and Alonzo Clark, from North Carolina. She considered becoming a doctor or a musician, but instead chose to study romance languages at Queens College of the City University of New York. She received her bachelor's degree in 1966. She continued her language studies at the Université de Nancy in Lorraine, France, and in 1969 returned to Queens College and received her master's degree in French.

== Career ==
During the 1970s, she worked as a teaching assistant in French and later as a lecturer in Afro-American Studies. Clark received her Ph.D in French and ethnology in 1983 from the University of California, Berkeley. While completing her Ph.D. thesis at UC Berkeley, she joined Tufts University as an assistant professor of African and Caribbean literature.

Clark returned to the University of California, Berkeley, in 1991 as an associate professor in the Department of African American Studies, where she taught popular courses on African women writers and African Diaspora literature.

As a scholar, Clark co-edited several books and also authored numerous essays on Haitian theater and African American dances, including research on dancer and anthropologist Katherine Dunham. Perhaps Clark's best known essay is "Developing Diaspora Literacy and Marasa Consciousness", in which she further articulates “diaspora literacy”, coined in her earlier writing. She used this phrase to describe a reader's ability to understand multiple levels of meanings in folk expressions, stories, and words within communities of the Black Diaspora. According to Clark, "This type of literacy is more than a purely intellectual exercise. It is a skill for both narrator and reader which demands a knowledge of historical, social, cultural and political development generated by lived and textual experience."

A cosmopolitan scholar, Clark was multilingual, speaking French, Spanish, Creole, and some Wolof. Throughout her career, Clark wrote passionately about: “African and Caribbean literatures, Afro-Caribbean folklore, African Diaspora theater, African American dance history, and critical pedagogy."

To combat the high attrition rate among Black students at UC Berkeley, Clark developed "Introduction to the University", a course many students credit with helping them navigate the university system and develop foundational skills that helped them prepare for, and succeed in, graduate school. She also helped launch the doctoral program in African American and African Diaspora Studies, one of the first such programs in the nation. She co-founded the St. Claire Drake Symposium, an annual event that enables scholars in Africana Studies to network and share their research. She also co-founded the Haitian Studies Association.

== Awards ==
The Haitian Studies Association honored Clark in 1992 during its fourth annual conference at Tufts University. She received the inaugural Social Sciences Distinguished Service Award at UC Berkeley in 1996. She also received a Guggenheim Fellowship for research on Dunham, a fellowship to study at the Université de Dakar, Senegal. She was a fellow-in-residence at Brown University through the Rockefeller Foundation.

== Legacy ==
Her concept of Diaspora literacy is viewed by many as seminal in the areas of Diasporic literature, dance, and African Studies. In 2011, the African American Studies Department at UC Berkeley launched the VèVè Clark Institute for Engaged Scholars. The program works to prepare a cadre of African Studies majors in the discipline for graduate programs, professional schools, and other postgraduate careers.

Clark never married and left no known immediate surviving family.

== Bibliography ==
- Clark, VèVè A. (Editor) & Johnson, Sara E. (Editor) (2006). Kaiso!: Writings by and about Katherine Dunham (Studies in Dance History). Madison, WI: University of Wisconsin Press. ISBN 978-0299212742
- Clark, VèVè (Editor) & Garner, Shirely Nelson (Editor) & Higonnet, Margaret (Editor) (1996) Anti-feminism in the Academy. Paperback.

New York, NY: Routledge. ISBN 978-0415910712

- Clark, VèVè A. (Editor) & Joeres, Ruth-Ellen Boetcher (Editor) & Sprengnether, Madelon (Editor) (1993). Revising the Word and the World: Essays in Feminist Literary Criticism. Paperback. Chicago, IL: University of Chicago Press. ISBN 978-0226400648
- Clarke, VèVè (Author) & Hodson, Millicent (Author) & Neiman, Catrina (Author) (1984) The Legend of Maya Deren, Vol 1 Part 1: Signatures (1917–1942). Paperback. New York, NY: Anthology Film Archives. ISBN 978-0911689150
