= Patrick Bellegarde-Smith =

Haitian historian

Patrick Bellegarde-Smith is a professor emeritus of Africology at the University of Wisconsin–Milwaukee. Bellegarde-Smith is an associate editor of the Journal of Haitian Studies and former president of the Haitian Studies Association and the Congress of Santa Barbara (KOSANBA), a scholarly association for the study of Vodou and other African-derived religions.

== Education ==
He earned his PhD in international relations from American University and he holds degrees in comparative politics and history.

== Family ==
Bellegarde-Smith is the grandson of the Haitian diplomat Dantès Bellegarde. Bellegarde-Smith is an houngan, or Vodou priest.

== Books ==
- In the Shadow of Powers: Dantès Bellegarde in Haitian Social Thought (1985)
- Haiti: The Breached Citadel (1990) (Second Edition 2004)
- Fragments of Bone: Neo-African Religions in a New World (Editor) (2005)
- Haitian Vodou: Spirit, Myth, and Reality (Co-editor with Claudine Michel) (2006)
- Invisible Powers: Vodou and Development in Haiti (Co-editor with Claudine Michel) (2006)
