= Diaspora literacy =

Literary theory of cultural understanding within the African diaspora

Diaspora literacy is a phrase coined by literary scholar Vévé Clark in her work "Developing Diaspora Literacy and Marasa Consciousness" (Spillers:1991, 40–60). It is the ability to understand and/or interpret the multi-layered meanings of stories, words, and other folk sayings within any given community of the African diaspora. These meanings supersede those of "...Western or westernized signification" (42), meaning that they go beyond literal or typical literary interpretation into an area of folk understanding that could only be recognized by the eye skilled in such an understanding. Readers rely solely upon a knowledge and lived experience of social, historical, and cultural climates of the various cultures of the African diaspora as a foundation for interpretation.

== Theoretical foundations of diaspora literacy ==
Diaspora literacy is based upon several different theoretical concepts. The first concept is that of African diaspora, which is "...the phenomenon and history..." of the displacement of African-descended peoples in the New World colonies of the Atlantic. The second concept is a trio of socio-political movements (The New Negro/Harlem Renaissance; Indigenismo; and Negritude) of the 1920s and 1930s (1991, 40). In these movements, the displaced and colonized peoples of the Afro-Atlantic world came to embrace an awareness and appreciation of the political, cultural, and creative self as something unique in itself and thus not required to conform to European aesthetics. The third and final concept is that of "signifyin(g)". Signifying is a literary concept developed by scholar Henry Louis Gates Jr. in his work The Signifying Monkey (Gates, 1988). Essentially the author takes a well-known story or idea and revises it, embellishing it with the language and imbuing it with cultural meanings and signs related to his or her particular Afro-descended culture or within that specific cultures generational cultures. If one were to trace and compare the line of repetitions and reversals, one would then see the creation of a Diasporic literary canon, imbued with a Diasporic language that only a literacy of the intricacies of the cultures could interpret.

== History of the term diaspora literacy ==
At the late 1980s the African Literature Association Conference by Clark. She presented it in a paper delivered on Maryse Condé's Heremakhonon (1991, 58–59). It was later revised in "Developing Diaspora Literacy: Allusion in Maryse Condé's Hérémakhonon" (Davies: 1989, 315–331) in 1989, and in "Developing Diaspora Literacy and Marasa Consciousness" in 1991. Since then, several literature and education scholars have adopted the concept. The most recent adaptation appeared in Joyce E. King’s 2006 "'If Justice is Our Objective': Diaspora Literacy, Heritage Knowledge, and the Praxis of Critical Studyin' for Human Freedom" (Ball: 2006, 337–360).
