= Oungan =

Male priest in Haitian Vodou

Haitian Vodou Priest Oungan
- Leader in Haitian Vodou
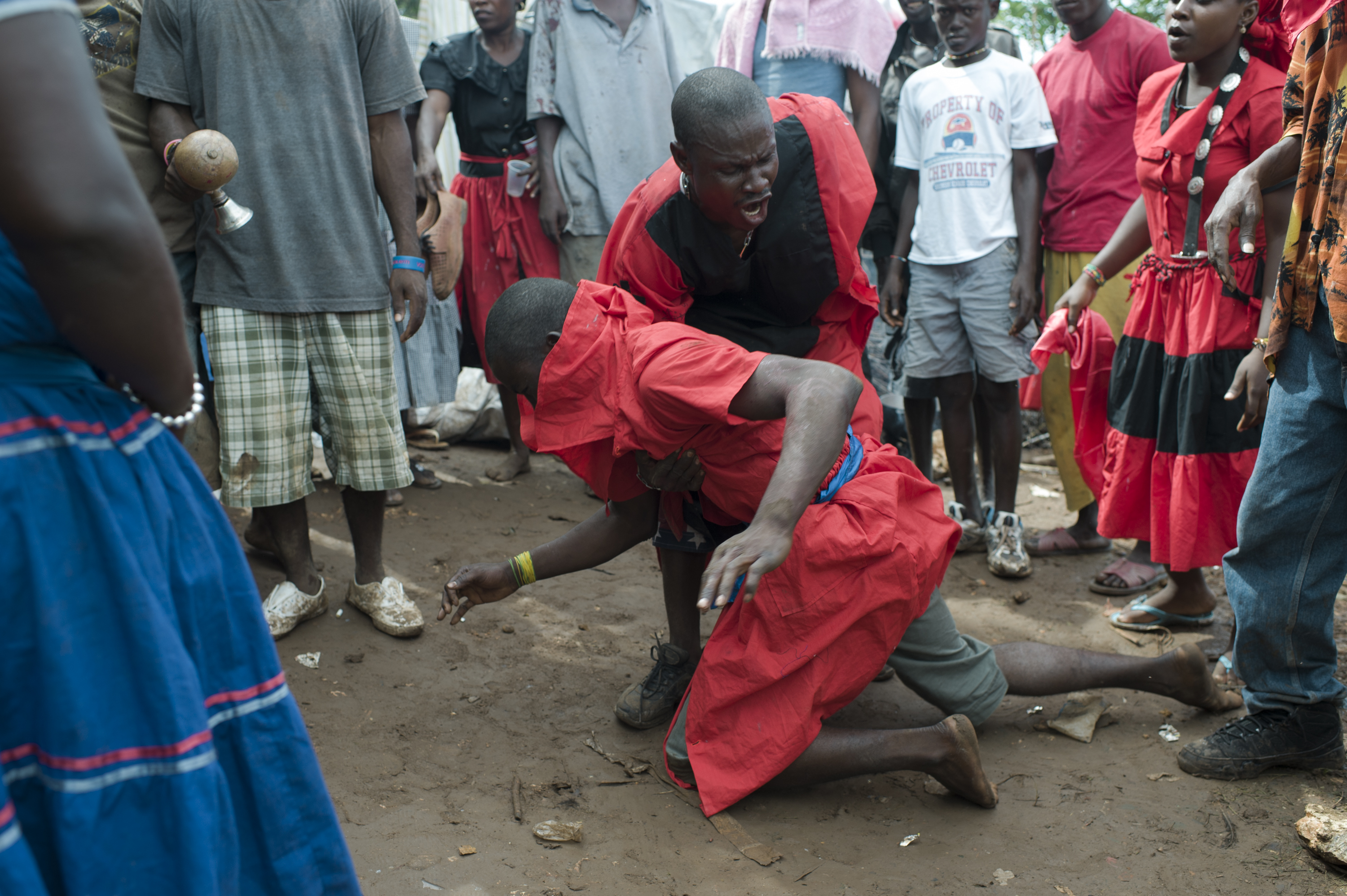
- Oungan ceremony ritual
- Location: Haiti
- Religious origins: Dahomey (present day Benin Republic)
- Parent tribe: Fon
- Language: English, French, Fon, Creole
- Religion: Haitian Vodou

Oungan (also written as houngan, pronounced [ũɡã]) is the term for a male priest in Haitian Vodou (a female priest is known as a mambo). The term is derived from Gbe languages (Fon, Ewe, Adja, Phla, Gen, Maxi and Gun). The word hounnongan means chief priest. Hounnongan or oungans are also known as makandals.

Haitian Vodou is an African diasporic religion, which blends traditional Vodun from the Kingdom of Dahomey with Roman Catholicism. In similarity to their West African heritage, oungans are leaders within the community who run temples (ounfò) to respect and serve lwa (also written as loa) alongside the Grand Maître (grandmaster or creator). Lwa are like spirits, encompassing a collection of Yoruba, Fon, Kongo, etc., spirits and Roman Catholic saints, as well as the Taíno spirits that were already there. Lwa manifest themselves in people during Vodou ceremonies through spirit possession. Each lwa has a distinct dance rhythm, song, sacrificial victuals, and clothing. Lwa choose oungans whilst they dream, where they are instructed by the gods of the Vodun to be their servants in the mortal world. It is the oungan's role to preserve rituals and songs, maintaining and developing the relationship between the spirits and the community as a whole. oungans are entrusted with leading the service of all of the spirits of their lineage, performing rituals for the community - death and marriage ceremonies; healing rituals; initiations for new priests (tesses); creating potions and casting spells; and dream interpretations. Sometimes they may also be bokor (sorcerers). The Duvalier dictatorship has some oungans (Vodou priests) and other Vodou practitioners were members of the secret police, the Tonton Macoutes, which promotes the image of Papa Doc as a practitioner of Vodou to identify spiritual forces with loyalty to him, until his son Baby Doc was overthrown and fled to France in 1986.

Dutty Boukman was a oungan known for sparking the Haitian Slave Revolt of 1791, working together with Cécile Fatiman to inspire and organise the slaves for the revolution. Other notable oungans include artist Clotaire Bazile, professor Patrick Bellegarde-Smith, and Don Pedro venerator of the Petro lwa.

== History ==
Haitian Vodou originates from the Kingdom of Dahomey which makes up a part of modern-day Benin and western Nigeria. During the slave trade, thousands of people from Dahomey, largely Fon and Ewe, were enslaved and transported across the Atlantic to islands in the Caribbean. During the French Colonial Period, the economy of Saint-Domingue (modern-day Haiti) was based on slave labour working on sugar plantations. These West African natives brought the Vodun culture and religion from their homeland to Haiti. Vodun alongside the European-imposed Roman Catholicism fused to create what we know as Haitian Vodou. Therefore, there are many elements of Haitian Vodou that can be traced back to Dahomey origins.

Besides Vodun and Christianity, Haitian Vodou also incorporated elements from Islam and Celtic sailors' mythology which came to influence Haitian Vodou on the slave boats and in ports. This blend of traditions gives oungans a reputation of being "cosmopolitan" in their manner. Oungans are responsible for keeping the vitality of Haitian Vodou alive and adapting it to contemporary needs. Author Ian Thomson stated that a "voodoo priest is usually an astute businessman," proving that both the oungan and the Haitian Vodou religion are flexible and able to adapt to their changing environments to survive.

== Etymology ==
In Gbe languages (spoken in Nigeria, Benin, Togo and Ghana), the term Vodun is synonymous with the prefix hun-, which lends itself to the root of the name oungan amongst other terminologies such as hounsi and hounfort. The ending -gan, also originates from Dahomey, meaning "chief of spirits", or in other words, "chief priest". The suffix ‘Gan or ga ‘denotes big or importance. ‘Si or Shi’ denotes a female, eg hounsi means a female priest or adherent.

== Vodou priesthood ==
Oungans can be chosen in three ways – through a dream-like experience in which a lwa informs that they are chosen as their servants, having visions, or through degradation and transference rituals after an important oungan's death. Each oungan has authority in their own temple, however, there is no official hierarchy within Haitian Vodou.

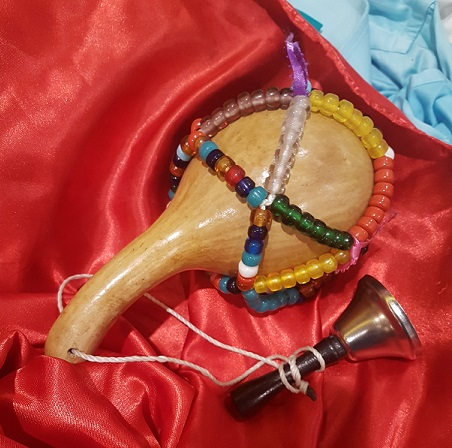
An asson, the sacred rattle of oungans and manbos. Made of a calabash gourd, it is covered with beads or snake vertebrae. A small bell is attached.

To become a oungan, one must first undergo initiation. First, a period of isolation and seclusion (typical of an African initiation) known as Kouche Kanzo must take place. Then Lave Tèt (“the washing of the head”) takes place, which is a ceremony where one's hair is washed seven times with a mixture made of plants to spiritually cleanse in order to better receive the lwa. Then, various rituals and sacrifices are made. This is often a lengthy and expensive process, as numerous items have to be purchased such as the presentation of Iwa's favourite food and drinks, and special handmade ceremonial clothes.

Upon a visit to Papa Loko (the patron of the manbos and oungans), an asson (sacred rattle) is given to the oungan as the mark of their priesthood. Oungans also receive a spiritual name from Papa Loko which is used as identification amongst other oungans and manbos.

== Rituals and ceremonies ==
Due to the large Catholic population in Haiti, many Haitians are both practicing Catholics and of the Vodou religion. Therefore, Vodou ceremonies are not permitted to take place during major Christian holidays such as Christmas. Some features of Catholicism make up part of Haitian Vodou such as Bible readings, prayer recitations, and candle usage.

The oungan has full control and a central role in ceremonies each oungan or manbo having an original take on the style of ritual performed. They serve as the middlemen between followers of Vodou and lwa. Customary colours for a oungan are red, black, and white.

Oungans may have students or assistants called badji-cans.

=== Consecration ===
Consecration is a way of dedicating to the sacred and is performed in Haitian Vodou by signing a cross with equal arm length over an item, person, or in the space which should be consecrated. A oungan typically performs this and may use a piece of ginger leaf or another sprig dipped in water to make the blessing. The oungan will first align their bowl of fleur ginen (a mixture of cornmeal and herbs dedicated to a particular vèvè) with the cosmos in which they stand centred. Then, the vire (a ritualised set of turns and dips to orient the body) is performed, whilst holding a candle and cup of water in the hands. After this is complete, each of the four directions is saluted. After this, the oungan places the water cup on the ground and touches the earth with the back of his hand, saying, "we come from the earth and to it we will return." Finally, a different vire is performed and the oungan with his ason beckons the audience to sit. When everyone is seated, songs for each lwa and vèvè are sung repeatedly throughout the night.

=== Death rituals ===
After a death, family members may visit a oungan to find out who was responsible for the decease.

Desounen is a death ritual and the first of a yearlong remembrance to be performed after the death of a Vodou initiate. The oungan places pieces of the corpse, such as nails or hair, in the deceased's govi. lwa with whom the deceased had a special connection (often family lwa), are called upon and asked to possess the body one final time. Then sacrifices are made to the lwa and blood is dripped onto the corpse. Lwa are asked to permanently leave the body and find peace in a sacred necklace worn by the deceased and now kept in a govi. This officially releases the gwo bonnanj (sacred life force) from the corpse, letting the gwo bonnanj free to find a new life.

A year and a day after the death, it is necessary to remove the gwobonaj again to ensure the safety and health of the relatives of the deceased. This ceremony is called retirer d'en bas de l'eau ("to remove from underneath the water"): the dead, having been deprived of material form and having gone to rest in the waters of the abyss, are ritually called up from “under the water.” This is the final binding of the family lwa to the govi, achieved by the oungan through songs, dances, and prayers to prominent lwa.

=== Lwa veneration ===
To summon each lwa, a specific vèvè must be traced. The oungan writes these out in his personal notebook, with each lwa having unique formulae with specific diagrams and instructions. These instructions include specific drum rhythms, dance movements, and songs. The specific combination of multi-sensory media invokes the lwa to leave the vilokan (abode of the lwa) and possess the oungan during the ceremony. One or multiple lwas can be summoned as necessary for the occasion.

=== Ville-aux-Camps ===
The home of lwa is said to be an island below the sea in the mythological city of Ville-aux-Camps. Few living persons have entered the city, however, contact with the city is more common and can be achieved through the oungan. The oungan first invokes Legba (lwa of the crossroads), who allows further communication with the divine world, acting as an interpreter and protector for lwa. Legba is called upon through rhythmic dance and song alongside a vèvè drawing.

=== Spirit possession ===
Spirit possession is said to usually occur at ceremonies, wherein a few participants may become momentarily possessed by lwa, who are invoked by the oungan. The possessed may gain the characteristics of the chosen lwa and be able to perform unusual feats such as touching a hot iron without it leaving scald marks. Possession may also occur outside of a Vodou ceremony, but only in times of emotional stress.

=== Pilgrimage to Saut-d'Eau ===
A pilgrimage to the village of Saut-d'Eau, in central Haiti, takes place every annum by followers of Haitian Vodou. On July 16, thousands gather at the waterfalls just outside the village to pay respects to the Virgin Mary and Ezili Freda Dahomey. Pilgrims bathe in the waters to ready themselves for spirit possession and healing. Oungans make tiny temples in jungle clearings nearby the waterfall, where they dance with pilgrims holding blue and red ribbons, tying them around trees to rid themselves of ill health.

== Notable oungans ==
Anti-slavery advocate, Dutty Boukman, was born in Senegambia (modern-day Senegal and The Gambia) and was brought to Jamaica during the slave trade. From there, he eventually ended up in Haiti, where he would be a missionary in starting the Haitian Revolution of 1791. Boukman was an oungan and therefore held significant influence over the slave population, making it possible to spark a slave revolt. Boukman was also known as "Zambo" to his followers. On August 14, 1791, Boukman alongside Cécile Fatiman (a manbo), went to the woodland of Bois-Caïman in the Northern part of Haiti. Here, a Vodou ceremony took place. Legend obscures the details of the ceremony. As a diasporic religion, orality plays a large part in the history of Haitian Vodou, therefore there are many disagreements between historians as to the exact events which took place. The only written records were by the French occupation, therefore have questionable credibility. The largely accepted story is that Fatiman is believed to have contacted the West African deities involving animal sacrifice and an oath. Boukman is thought to have delivered a passionate speech calling the enslaved Africans to venerate their own original Supreme Being and to oppose the "false" Christian God. Boukman's speech concluded with "Route lalibete nan tout ké nou!" ("Listen to the voice of liberty which speaks in the hearts of all of us!"). The speech had not only religious purposes but also sparked a desire for liberty and freedom amongst the slaves.

Another notable oungan is artist Clotaire Bazile. He started his creative career making vèvè (sacred images drawn on the floor by scattering powders), but, all oungans undertake this ritual, so Bazile was not officially considered an artist at this time. In 1973, lwa, in Bazile's dreams, instructed him to make flags for his temple in Port-au-Prince. In 1980 Bazile opened a workshop where family members and friends can contribute to his work. His designs are distinctive geometric forms and drawn from dream memories before being transferred on cloth. The process is similar to procedures undertaken by imams and marabouts to create divination or amulet. In a 1993 interview in Brookline, Massachusetts, Bazile described the process of being chosen by lwa to undertake his artwork, “Since the Iwa chose me, I was obliged to do what they wanted. It’s an overwhelming experience to be pursued by the Iwa. There are two possibilities: either you do what they want or you die.” The flags made by Bazile have symbols that represent each group of Iwa, therefore having the power of the Iwa in them. The flags are baptised for ritual use to activate this power. Bazile also makes Paquet Congo (dressed bottles) which signal to the Petro Iwa.

Patrick Bellegarde-Smith is another notable oungan who is a professor emeritus of Africology at University of Wisconsin-Milwaukee.

Oungan Don Pedro (or Don Petwo) lived in the late 18th century and was an active participant in the struggle for Haiti's independence in 1804. Pedro was gifted with clairvoyance and created a fast-paced dance to respect the Petro lwa, which are named after him.
