= Ason (disambiguation) =

Ason (朝臣) was a prestigious hereditary noble title in Japan, used mainly between Asuka and Heian periods.

Ason, ASON and orthographic variants may also refer to:

== Israeli culture ==
- Ason Hanun-dalet, the 1977 Israeli CH-53 crash that killed 54
- Zihuy Korbanot Ason (ZAKA), a disaster victim relief and identification organisation

== Places ==
=== Philippines ===
- Ason, a barangay in Garchitorena, Camarines Sur, Philippines
- Bal-ason, a barangay in Gingoog, Philippines

=== Spain ===
- Asón, Cantabria, a town in Arredondo, Cantabria, Spain
- Asón (river), Catalonia, Spain
- Asón-Agüera, the valley of the Asón River, Cantabria, Spain
- Collados del Asón Natural Park, Cantabria, Spain

=== Other places ===
- Ason, two settlements in Myanmar
- Asan, Kathmandu, a ceremonial, market and residential square in Kathmandu, Nepal
- Åsön, former name of the island of Södermalm in Stockholm, Sweden

== Physical sciences and technology ==
- Automatically switched optical network (nowadays Automatic switched-transport network)
- asON, antisense oligonucleotide

== People ==
- Ason (fl. about 1845), a Chinese martial artists, teacher(s) of Kokan Oyadomari
- Ason, Ason Jones and Ason Unique, aliases of the US rapper Ol' Dirty Bastard (1968–2004)
- Ason Kidd, nickname of US basketballer Jason Kidd (born 1973)

== Characters ==
- A character in the Philippine sitcom Home Along Da Riles
- A character in the Philippine-Malaysian soap opera Muli

== Other ==
- Ason, a ritual rattle wielded by the highest level of initiation manbo (priestesses) and oungan (priests) in Haitian Vodou ceremonies
- "Ason Jones", song by US rapper Raekwon on Only Built 4 Cuban Linx... Pt. II
- Ason, Luming at Teresing, a book in Philippine Children's Television Foundation's Karapatan Ng Bata series
- Inmobiliaria Asón SA, a Spanish real estate company involved with the Torre Picasso
- Naviera Ason SA, a Spanish shipping company; see MV Ranga
