= Slavery in Haiti =

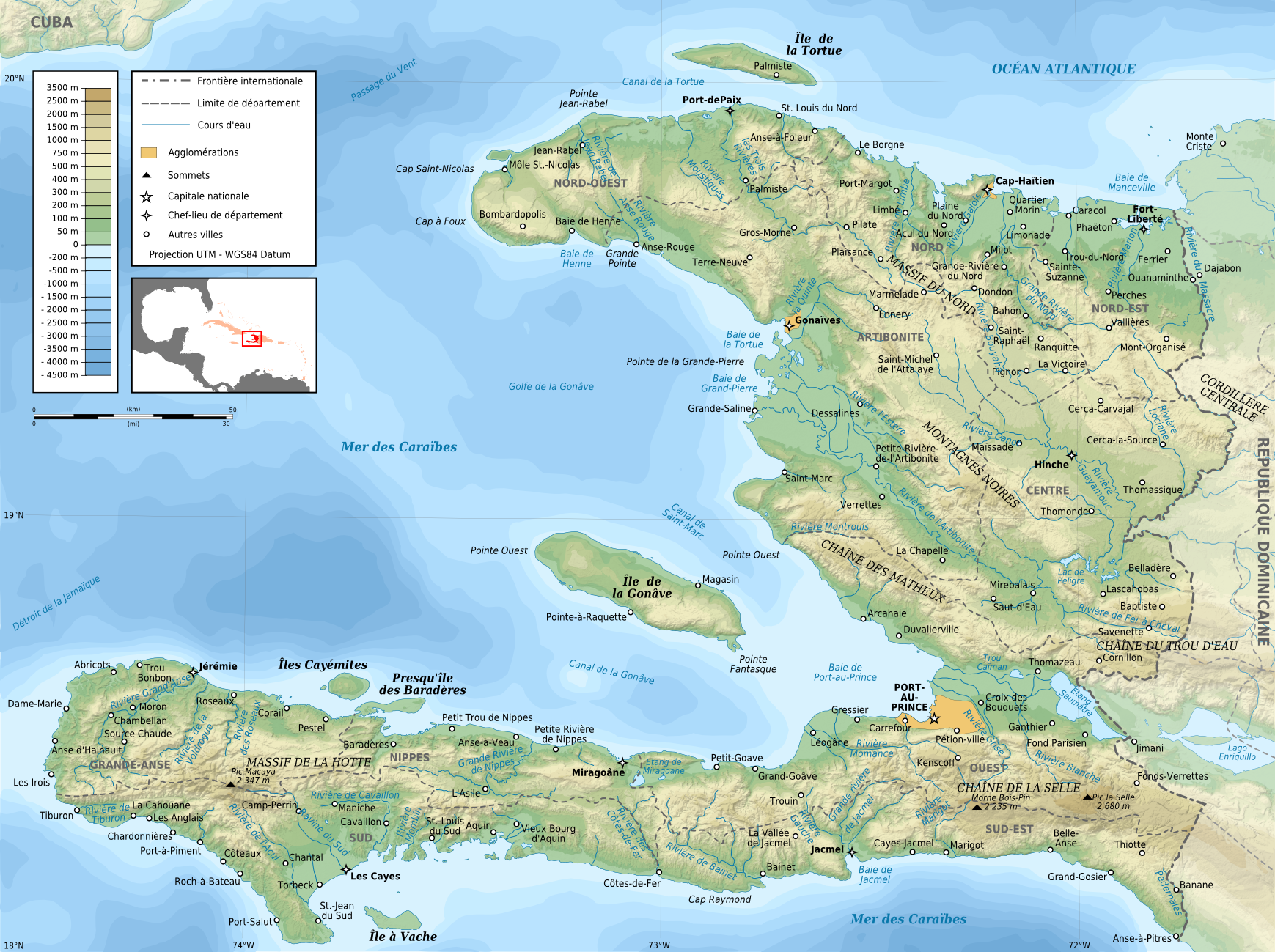
Haiti today

Slavery in Haiti (French: L'Esclavage en Haïti; Haitian Creole: Esklavaj an Ayiti) began at an unknown time with slavery being practiced by the native populations when the Spanish first arrived on the island in 1492. The Spanish engaged in forced labor of the Indigenous peoples until that community was decimated by disease. To replace the diminished native labor, enslaved Africans began being imported in earnest during the 16th century. By the early 17th century, Saint-Domingue (modern day Haiti) was a slave society with the majority of the population enslaved.

In response to the conditions of slavery, the ideals of the French Revolution, and the disproportionate ratio of enslaved to free people, Haiti was the site of a slave revolt that became the Haitian Revolution. Slavery was abolished during the revolution but afterwards forced labor was brought back by some leaders, believing a plantation-style economy was the only way for Haiti to succeed.

Unpaid labor is still widely practiced in Haiti. As many as half a million children are unpaid domestic servants called restavek, who routinely suffer physical and sexual abuse. Additionally, human trafficking, including child trafficking and sex trafficking, are significant problems in Haiti, in particular impacting Haitians migrating to the Dominican Republic. Many of these issues have been exasperated by natural disasters and instability.

Haiti has the second-highest incidence of slavery in the world, behind only Mauritania. The U.S. State Department's Office to Monitor and Combat Trafficking in Persons has placed the country in the "Tier 2 Watchlist" since 2017.

== History ==
=== Spanish Hispaniola (1492–1625) ===
The Taino natives living on the island that would come to be called Hispaniola welcomed Christopher Columbus and his crew when they landed on the island in October 1492. In the Pre-Columbian era, other Caribbean tribes would attack the island to kidnap people into slavery. The Spanish colonists institutionalized slavery on the island and turned it into a major business.

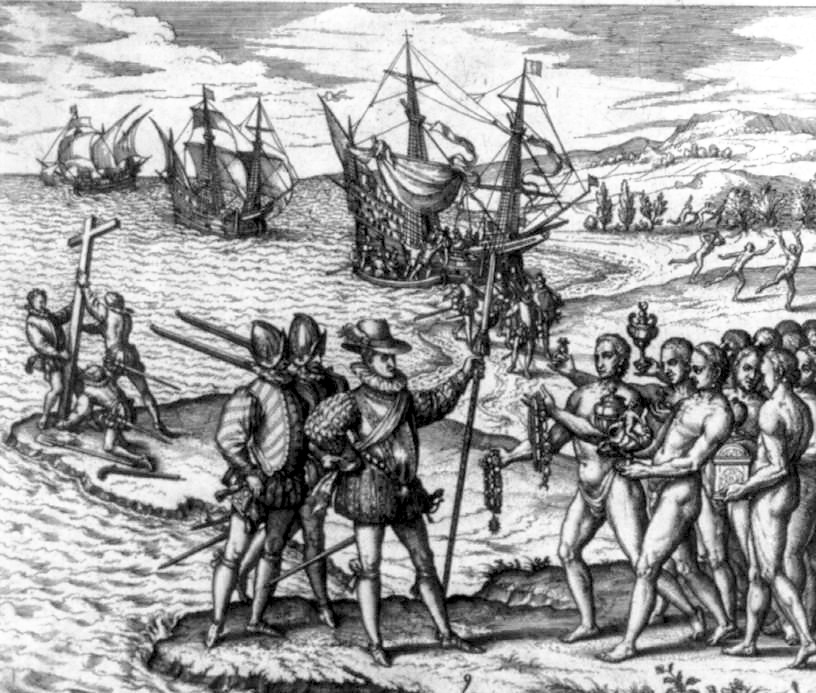
The natives of the island of Hispaniola initially approached Columbus and his soldiers with friendliness and generosity.

Over time, the Spanish set up plantations dependent on slave labor that grew sugar and other crops. In addition natives were forced to mine gold and copper, which took a heavy toll in life and health.

In response to the brutality, some the natives fought back and escaped into remote parts of the island's mountains and formed communities in hiding as "maroons". The Spanish responded to the native resistance with severe reprisals, for example destroying crops to starve the natives. In 1495, Spaniards sent 500 captured natives back to Spain as slaves, but 200 did not survive the voyage, and the others died shortly afterwards. In the late 1490s they planned to send 4,000 slaves back to Spain each year, but this expectation failed to take into account the rapid decline the native population would soon suffer and was never achieved.

It is not known how many Taino people were on the island prior to Columbus's arrival – estimates range from several thousand to eight million – but overwork slavery and in particular diseases, inadvertently introduced by the Europeans to which the natives had no resistance, quickly killed a large part of the population. Between 1492 and 1494, one third of the native population on the island had died and by 1514, 92% of the native population of the island had died.

Spanish missionary Bartolomé de las Casas spoke out against enslavement of the natives and the brutality of the Spaniards. Las Casas' campaign led to an official end of the enslavement of Tainos in 1542; however, it was replaced by the African slave trade.

The rapid rate at which the natives died left a labor void which was filled with the import of Africans. African labor was viewed as ideal since Africans and Europeans had been in contact with each other for centuries and had immunity to the same diseases.

Some newly arrived slaves from Africa and neighboring islands were able to escape and join maroon communities in the mountains. In 1519, Africans and Native Americans joined forces to start a slave rebellion that turned into a years-long uprising, which was eventually crushed by the Spanish in the 1530s.

The practice of slavery in the Spanish New World colonies would become so large-scale that imports of African slaves outnumbered Spanish immigration to the New World by the end of the 1500s.

=== Saint Domingue (1625–1789) ===
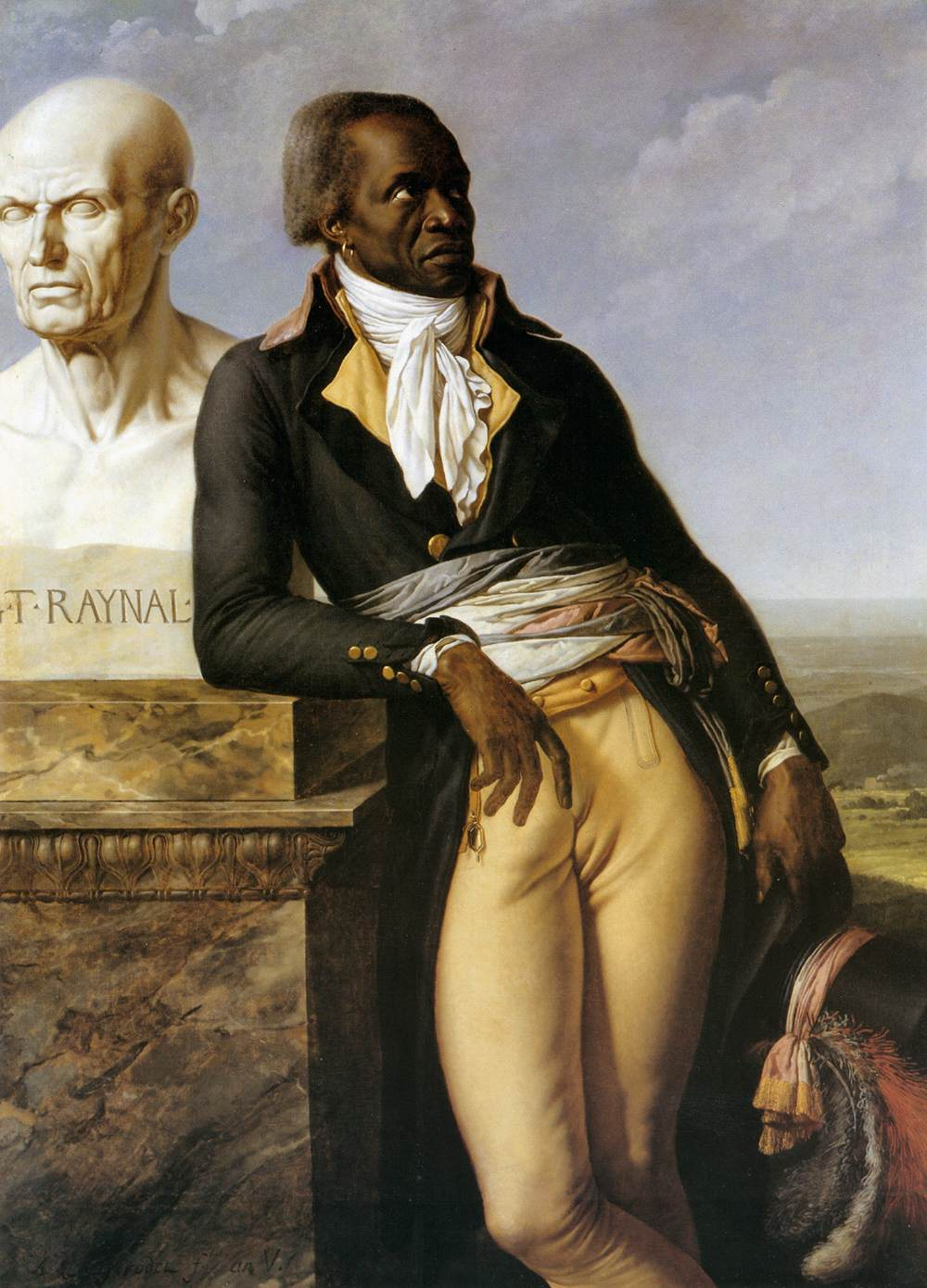
Jean-Baptiste Belley, an affranchi who became a rich planter, an elected member of the Estates General for Saint-Domingue, and later Deputy of the French National Convention

The Spanish ceded control of the western part of the island of Hispaniola to the French in the Treaty of Ryswick in 1697; France named its new colonial possession Saint-Domingue. The colony, based on the export of cash crops, particularly sugar cane, would become the richest in the world. Known as the "Pearl of the Antilles", the colony became the world's foremost producer of coffee and sugar. The French, like the Spanish, imported slaves from Africa. In 1681, there were only 2,000 slaves in Saint Domingue; by 1789, there were almost half a million.

While the French controlled Saint Domingue, they maintained a class system which covered both whites and free people of color. These classes divided up roles on the island and established a hierarchy. The highest class, known as the grands blancs (white noblemen), was composed of rich nobles, including royalty, and mainly lived in France. These individuals held most of the power and controlled much of the property on Saint-Domingue. Although their group was very small and exclusive, they were quite powerful.

Below the grands blancs (white noblemen) were the petits blancs (white commoners) and the gens de couleur libres (free people of color). These classes inhabited Saint Domingue and held a lot of local political power and control of the militia. Petits blancs shared the same societal level as gens de couleur libres.

The gens de couleur libres class was made up of affranchis (ex-slaves), free blacks, and mixed-race people, and they controlled much wealth and land in the same way as petits blancs; they held full citizenship and civil equality with other French subjects. Race was initially tied to culture and class, and some "white" St. Dominicans had non-white ancestry. Although the Creoles of color and affranchis held considerable power, they eventually became the subject of racism and a system of segregation due to the introduction of divisionist policies by the royal government, as the Bourbon regime feared the united power of the St. Dominicans.

Members of the petit blanc class began to distance themselves from gens de couleur libres and denigrate them. Influence by the Bourbon government rendered petits blancs envious of the gens de couleur libres' economical power. As on other Caribbean islands, the majority of the population of Saint-Domingue was people of color, and they far outnumbered whites on the island.

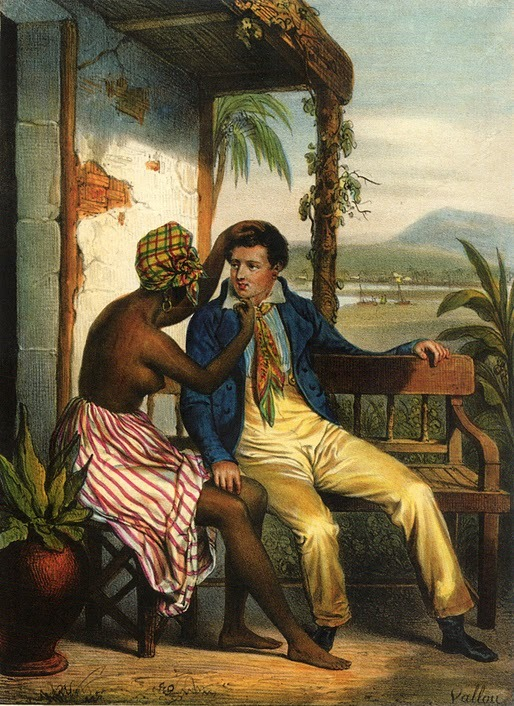
A petit blanc and an African woman. The caption reads "the petit blanc whom I love." Intermarriage between Africans and Europeans created a multiracial Creole population in Saint-Domingue.

Planters took care to treat slaves well in the beginning of their time on the plantation, and they slowly integrated slaves into the plantation's labor system. On each plantation there was a black commander who supervised the other slaves on behalf of the planter, and the planter made sure not to favor one African ethnic group over others. Most slaves who came to Saint-Domingue worked in fields or shops; younger slaves often became household servants, and old slaves were employed as surveillants. Some slaves became skilled workmen, and they received privileges such as better food, the ability to go into town, and liberté des savanes (savannah liberty), a sort of freedom with certain rules. Slaves were considered to be valuable property, and slaves were attended by doctors who gave medical care when they were sick.

There were numerous kinds of plantations in Saint-Domingue. Some planters produced indigo, cotton, and coffee; these plantations were small in scale, and usually only had 15-30 slaves, creating an intimate work environment. However, the most valuable plantations produced sugar. The average sugar plantation employed 300 slaves, and the largest sugar plantation on record employed 1400 slaves. These plantations took up only 14% of Saint-Domingue's cultivated land; comparatively, coffee was 50% of all cultivated land, indigo was 22%, and cotton only 5%. Because of the comparative investment requirement between sugar plantations and all other plantation types, there was a big economic gap between normal planters and sugar "lords."

While grands blancs owned 800 large scale sugar plantations, the petits blancs and gens de couleur (people of color) owned 11,700 small scale plantations, of which petits blancs owned 5,700 plantations, counting 3,000 indigo, 2,000 coffee, and 700 cotton; the affranchis and Creoles of color owned 6,000 plantations that mainly produced coffee of which they held an economic monopoly.

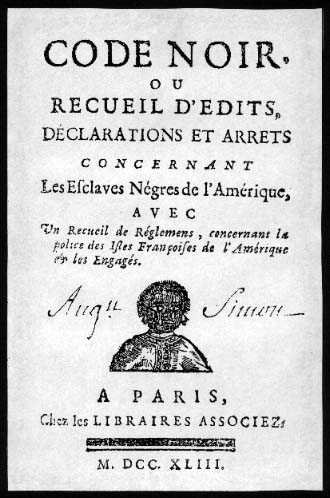
The Code Noir regulated behavior and treatment of slaves in the French colonies

Some sugar planters, bent on earning high sugar yields, worked their slaves very hard. Costs to start a sugarcane plantation were very high, often causing the proprietor of the plantation to go into deep debt. Many slaves on sugar cane plantations died within a few years; it was cheaper to import new slaves than to improve working conditions. The death rate of slaves on Saint Domingue's sugar cane plantations was higher than anywhere else in the Western hemisphere; indeed, slaves working on sugar plantations in Saint-Domingue came to have a 6-10% annual mortality rate, causing St. Dominican sugar planters to import new slaves frequently.

Over the colony's hundred-year course, about a million slaves succumbed to the conditions of slavery. Some slaves of African ethnicities who believed in metempsychosis, the belief of the soul's migration at death, committed suicide shortly after arriving on the island, as they believed that in death they could return to their home territory where they would regain the rank, wealth, relatives, and friends that they had. Some pregnant slaves living in poor conditions on sugar plantations did not survive long enough or have healthy enough pregnancies to birth live babies, but if they did, the children often died young due to malnourishment. On some sugar plantations, food was insufficient, and slaves were expected to grow and prepare it for themselves on top of their 12-hour workdays.

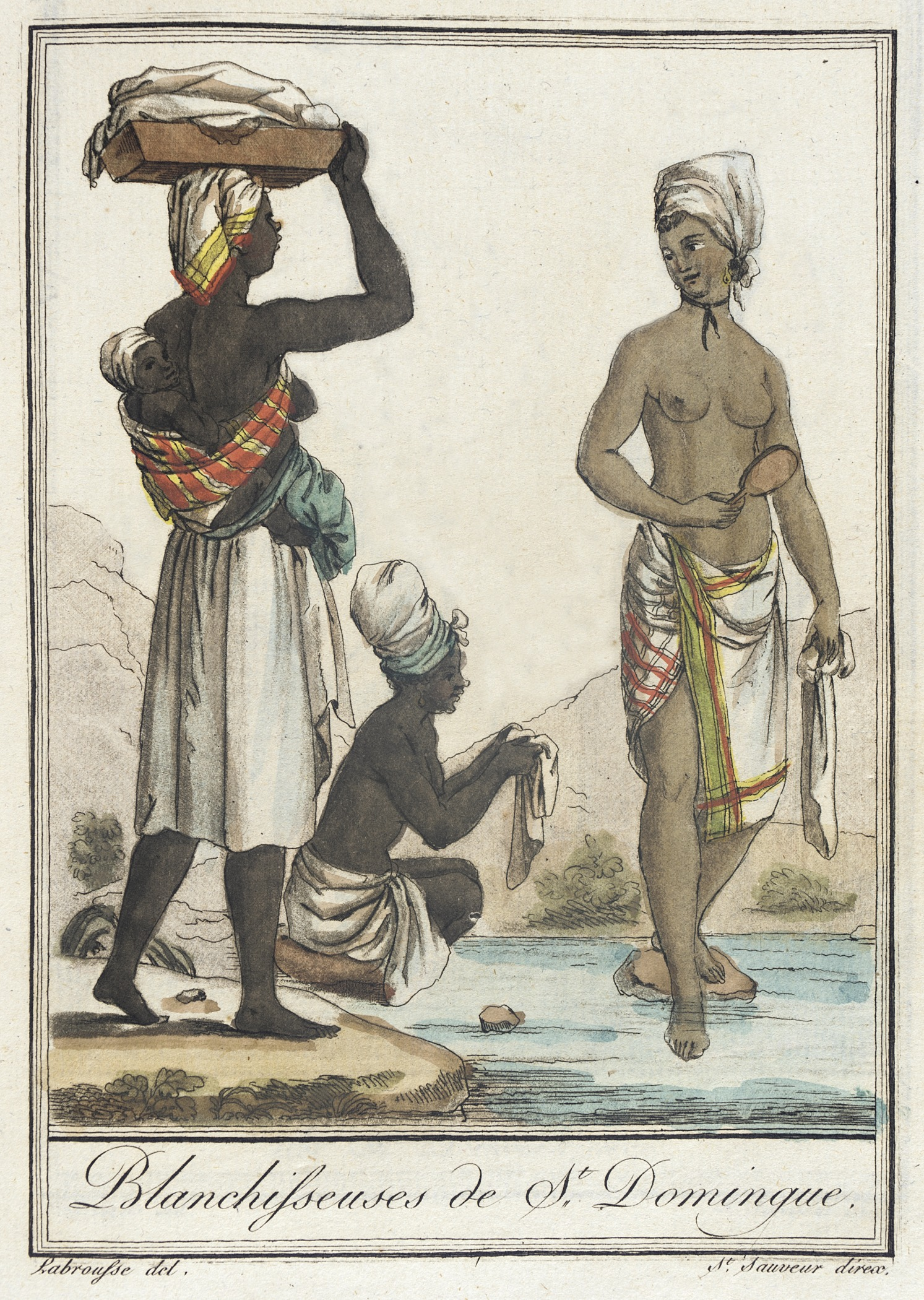
St. Dominican servant women bathing

In 1685, the French king Louis XIV decreed the Code Noir, a regulation of the treatment of slaves. Although the Code Noir was established to protect the rights of St. Dominican slaves and despite the presence of a rural police, due to Saint-Domingue's difficult terrain and the seclusion of various plantations, some slaves were abused. There are extreme cases recorded where slaves were whipped, burned, buried alive, restrained and allowed to be bitten by swarms of insects, mutilated, raped, and had limbs amputated. On some plantations, slaves caught eating the sugar cane crop would be forced to wear tin muzzles in the fields.

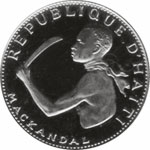
François Mackandal on a 20 gourde coin, 1968

About 48,000 slaves in Saint Domingue escaped from their plantation; slaveholders hired bounty hunters to catch these maroons. Those who were not caught and re-enslaved established communities away from settled areas. Maroons would organize raids called mawonag on plantations, stealing supplies that their communities needed to survive, such as food, tools and weapons. One famous maroon, François Mackandal, escaped into the mountains in the middle of the 18th century and went on to plan attacks on plantation owners. Mackandal was caught and burned at the stake in 1758, but his legend lived on to inspire rebellion among slaves — and fear among slaveholders.

Enslaved Africans who fled to remote mountainous areas were called marron (French) or mawon (Haitian Creole), meaning 'escaped slave'. The maroons formed close-knit communities that practised small-scale agriculture and hunting. They were known to return to plantations to free family members and friends. On a few occasions, they also joined the Taíno settlements, who had escaped the Spanish in the 17th century. In the late 17th and early 18th centuries, there were a large number of maroons living in the Bahoruco mountains. In 1702, a French expedition against them killed three maroons and captured 11, but over 30 evaded capture, and retreated further into the mountainous forests. Further expeditions were carried out against them with limited success, though they did succeed in capturing one of their leaders, Michel, in 1719. In subsequent expeditions, in 1728 and 1733, French forces captured 46 and 32 maroons respectively. No matter how many detachments were sent against these maroons, they continued to attract runaways. Expeditions in 1740, 1742, 1746, 1757 and 1761 had minor successes against these maroons, but failed to destroy their hideaways.

In 1776-7, a joint French-Spanish expedition ventured into the border regions of the Bahoruco mountains, with the intention of destroying the maroon settlements there. However, the maroons had been alerted of their coming, and had abandoned their villages and caves, retreating further into the mountainous forests where they could not be found. The detachment eventually returned, unsuccessful, and having lost many soldiers to illness and desertion. In the years that followed, the maroons attacked a number of settlements, including Fond-Parisien, for food, weapons, gunpowder and women. It was on one of these excursions that one of the maroon leaders, Kebinda, who had been born in freedom in the mountains, was captured. He later died in captivity.

In 1782, de Saint-Larry decided to offer peace terms to one of the maroon leaders, Santiago, granted them freedom in return for which they would hunt all further runaways and return them to their owners. Eventually, at the end of 1785, terms were agreed, and the more than 100 maroons under Santiago's command stopped making incursions into French colonial territory.

In addition to escaping, slaves resisted by poisoning slaveholders, their families, their livestock, and other slaves — this was a common and feared enough occurrence that in, December 1746, the French king banned poisoning in particular. Arson was another form of slave resistance.

In 1791, St. Dominican Creoles began the French Revolution in Saint-Domingue; Republican revolutionaries incited a slave rebellion aimed at overthrowing the Bourbon Regime. Their main goal was to establish Republican control of Saint-Domingue and enforce the social & political equality for St. Dominican Creoles. These St. Dominican Republicans soon lost control of the slave rebellion.

Many of the slaves who fought during the Haitian Revolution were warriors who had been captured in war and enslaved by an opposing African ethnic group. Before the beginning of the French Revolution in 1789, there were eight times as many slaves in the colony as there were whites and free people of color people combined. In 1789, the French were importing 30,000 slaves a year and there were half a million slaves in the French part of the island alone, compared to about 40-45,000 whites and 32,000 free people of color.

=== Revolutionary period (1789–1804) ===
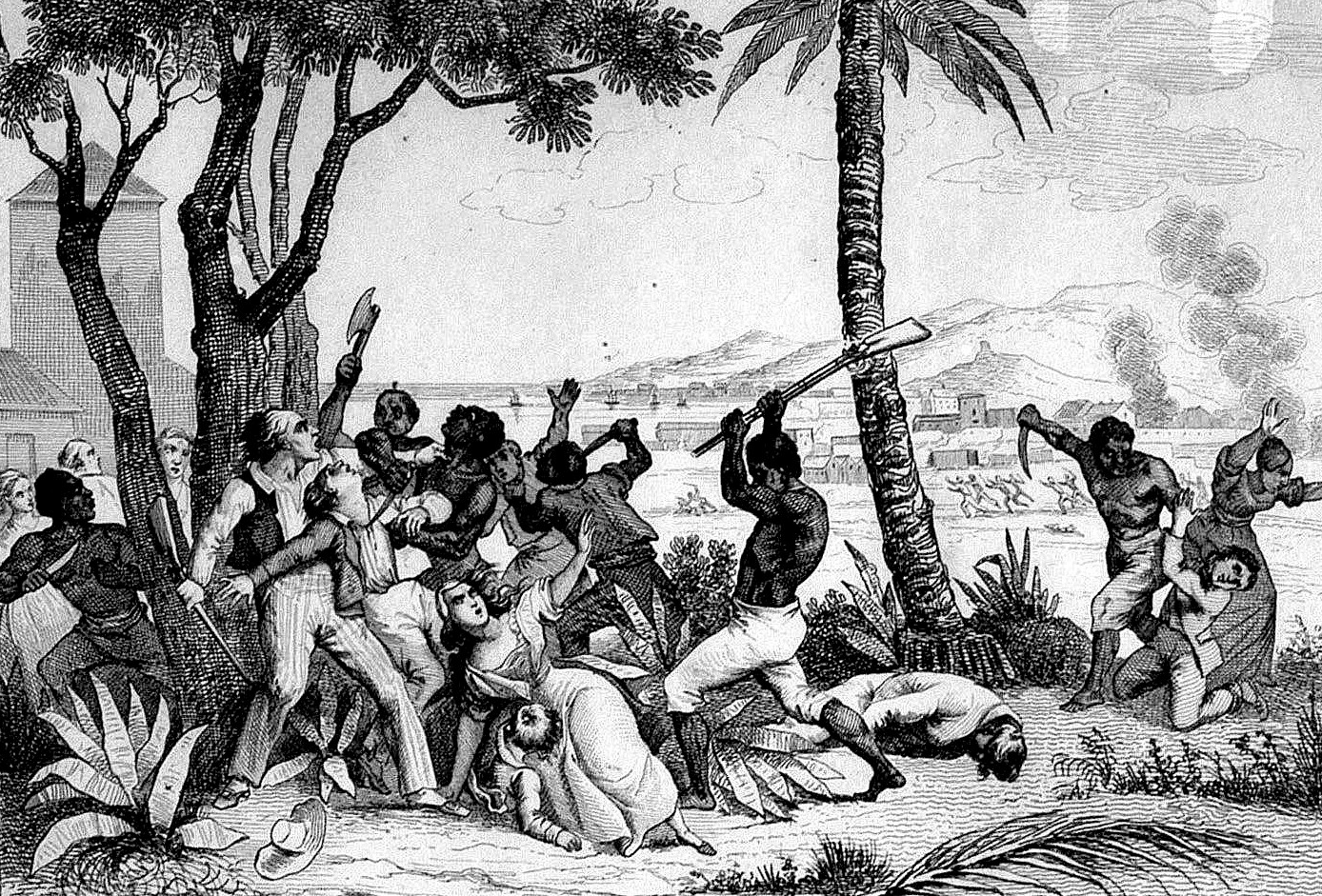
In 1791, slaves torched plantations and massacred whites.

The French Revolution in 1789 presented an opportunity for Saint-Domingue's middle class to organize a revolt, which was followed shortly thereafter by them inciting a general slave revolt. In 1791, Vincent Ogé led an uprising. However, this uprising failed and French authorities imprisoned him then eventually publicly executed him by snapping his back then beheading him. After this, Vodun priest Dutty Boukman met with other enslaved religious leaders and planned an insurrection. The insurrection began on August 21, 1791. Boukman, along with the other slaves, captured most of Plaine-du-Nord then tortured and murdered their slaveowners and their families then destroyed the plantations that they were forced to work on. By the end of the year, the slaves held control of two-thirds of the island while the majority of the slaveowners were either dead or trying to leave.

Two civil commissioners, Sonthonax and Polverel, were sent to the colony to implement the decree of April 4, 1792, which gave to free people of color and free Blacks the same rights as for the Whites. Their goal was also to maintain slavery and fight the slaves who revolted. Faced with the impossibility of suppressing the revolt, and confronted with the Spanish and the English, they were forced, in order to keep the hope of conserving Saint-Domingue to France, to give freedom to the slaves who would agree to fight alongside them, and then to extend this freedom to all the slaves of the colony. By February 1794, when the French government abolished slavery throughout its empire, all the slaves of Saint-Domingue had already been freed.

Although slavery was outlawed, Louverture, believing that the plantation economy was necessary, forced laborers back to work on the plantations using military might. By 1801, the revolt had succeeded, and Toussaint Louverture, having fetched control of the revolt and eliminated all opposition on the island, declared himself Governor-General-for-life of Saint-Domingue.

With a view toward re-establishing slavery, Napoleon Bonaparte sent his brother-in-law, Charles Leclerc, to regain control of Haiti, along with a fleet of 86 ships and 22,000 soldiers. The Haitians resisted the soldiers, but the French were more numerous and better positioned, until the rainy season brought yellow fever. As French soldiers and officers died, black Haitian soldiers who had allied themselves with the French began to defect to the other side.

=== Jean-Jacques Dessalines ===
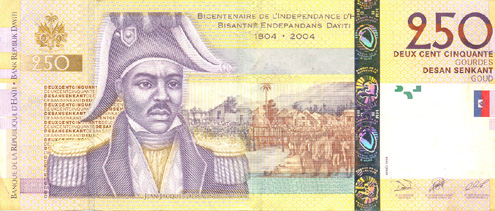
Jean-Jacques Dessalines featured on a 250-gourde banknote

In 1802, Louverture was arrested and deported to France, where he later died in prison, leaving leadership of the military to Jean-Jacques Dessalines. In 1804, the French were defeated. France officially gave up control of Haiti, making it the second independent country in the Americas (after the U.S.) and the first successful slave revolt in the world. Dessalines was the country's leader, first naming himself Governor-General-for-life, then Emperor of Haiti.

After the revolution, newly freed slaves were violently opposed to remaining on plantations, but Dessalines, like Louverture, used military might to keep them there, thinking that plantation labor was the only way to make the economy function. Most ex-slaves viewed Dessalines' rule as more of the same oppression they had known during de jure slavery. Dessalines was killed by a mob of his own officers in 1806.

=== Henri Christophe ===
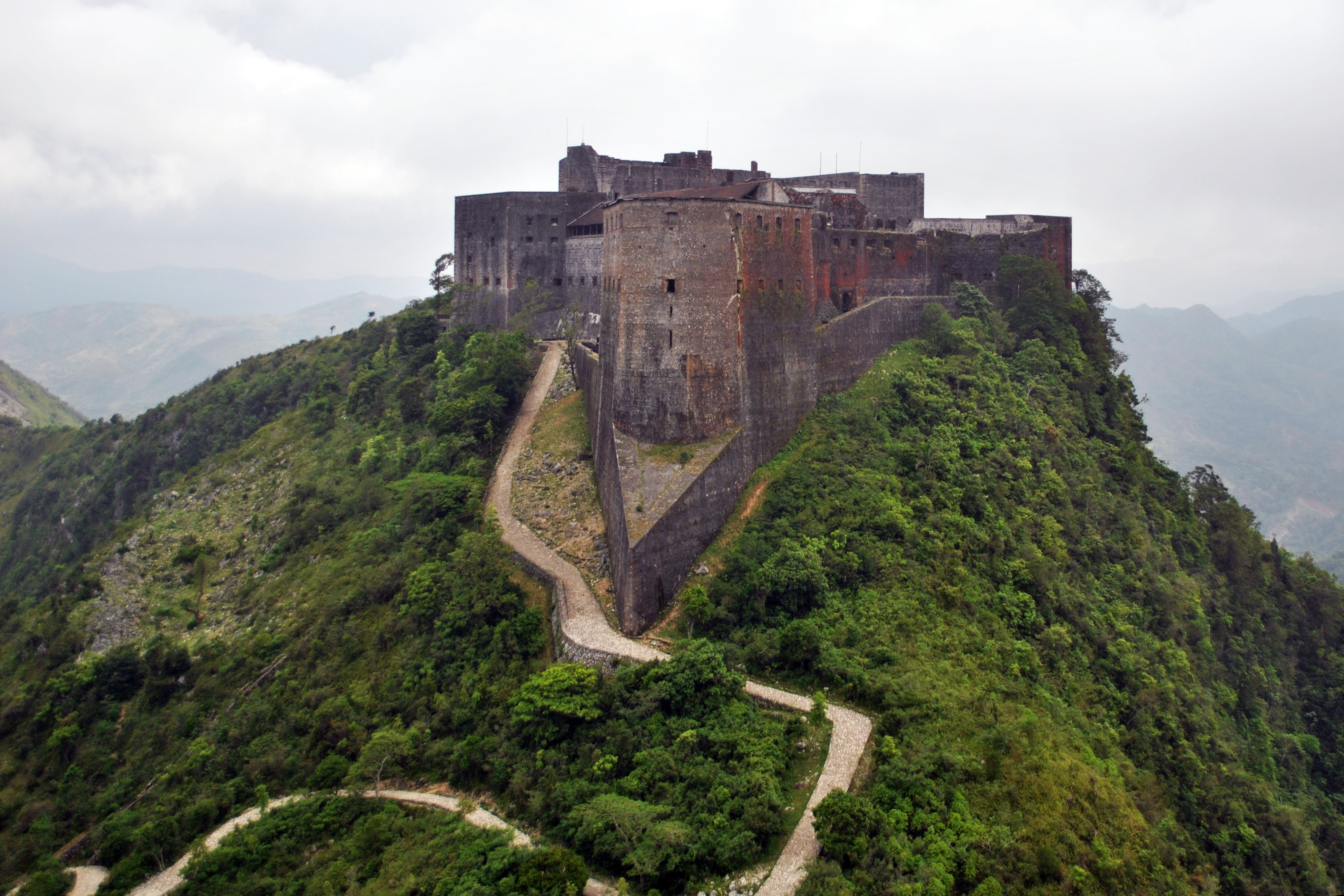
La Citadelle Laferrière in 2010

Dessalines' successor was King Henry Christophe, another general in the revolution. Christophe, fearing another French invasion, continued in Dessalines' footsteps fortifying the country. For the construction of one citadel, La Citadelle Laferrière, Christophe is thought to have forced hundreds of thousands of people into laboring on it, killing an estimated 20,000 of them.

Also like his predecessors Louverture and Dessalines, Christophe used military might to force former slaves to stay on the plantations. Plantation workers under Louverture and Christophe were not unpaid — they received one quarter of what they produced, paying the rest to plantation owners and the government. Under Christophe's rule it was also possible for black people to rent their own land or work in government, and agricultural workers on plantations could make complaints to the royal administration about working conditions. These ex-slaves might have also sometimes had a choice about what plantation they would work on — but they could not choose not to work, and they could not legally leave a plantation they were "attached" to. Many ex-slaves were probably forced to work on the same plantations they had worked on as slaves.

The population's staunch resistance to working on plantations — owned by whites or otherwise — made it too difficult to perpetuate the system, despite its profitability. Christophe and other leaders enacted policies allowing state land to be broken up and sold to citizens, and the plantation system largely gave way to one in which Haitians owned and farmed smaller lots.

=== Jean-Pierre Boyer ===
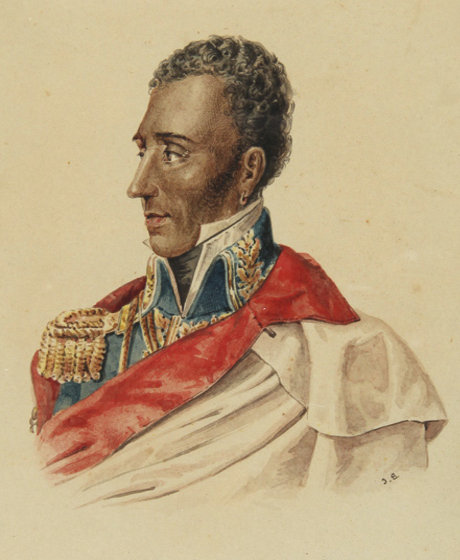
Jean-Pierre Boyer, president of Haiti from 1818 to 1843.

In 1817, a Haitian ship seized a Spanish slave ship bound for Cuba which had entered Haiti's waters, and, acting on standing government orders, brought it ashore. All 171 captive Africans were liberated and joyfully accepted into Haitian society, and President Jean-Pierre Boyer himself served as their godfather. The ship's captain, and later Cuban officials, protested to Boyer that his trade was legal, but Boyer maintained that the 1816 constitution decreed there could be no slaves in Haitian territory, and no reimbursement could be given for their value. Slave ships had also been seized and their human cargo freed under previous leaders Christophe and Alexandre Pétion, and slaves who managed to take control of ships and arrive in Haiti were given asylum. Slavers quickly learned to avoid Haiti's waters.

In 1825, France sent an armada to Haiti and threatened to blockade the country, preventing trade unless Boyer agreed to pay France 150,000,000 francs to reimburse it for losses of "property" — mostly its slaves. In exchange, France would recognize Haiti as an independent nation, which it had thus far refused to do. Boyer agreed without making the decision public beforehand, a move which met with widespread outrage in Haiti. The amount was reduced to 90,000,000 francs in 1838, equivalent to USD $19 billion in 2015. Haiti was saddled with this debt until 1947, and forced to forgo spending on humanitarian programs such as sanitation. In 1838, an estimated 30% of the country's yearly budget went to debt, and, in 1900, the amount had risen to 80%. Haiti took out loans from Germany, the U.S., and France itself to come up with this money, further increasing its debt burden and those countries' centrality in the Haitian economy.

Under pressure to produce money to pay the debt, in 1826 Boyer enacted a new set of laws called the Code Rural that restricted agricultural workers' autonomy, required them to work, and prohibited their travel without permission. It also reenacted the system of Corvée, by which police and government authorities could force residents to work temporarily without pay on roads. These laws met with widespread resistance and were difficult to enforce since the workers' access to land provided them autonomy and they were able to hide from the government.

The United States passed laws to keep Haitian merchants away from U.S. soil because slaveholders there did not want their slaves getting ideas about revolt from the Haitians. However, the two countries continued trade, with Haiti purchasing the weapons it needed, albeit at disadvantageous prices. The U.S. embargo of Haiti lasted 60 years, but Lincoln declared it unnecessary to deny the country's independence once the institution in the United States began to be ended. He encouraged newly freed slaves to emigrate there to attain a freedom he did not deem possible in the United States.

=== Unfree labor during US occupation ===
In July 1915, after political unrest and the mob murder of Haiti's president Vilbrun Guillaume Sam, the United States Marine Corps invaded Haiti. Prior to the occupation peasants had staged uprisings to resist moves by US investors to appropriate their land and convert the style of agriculture in the area from subsistence back to a plantation-like system—the idea of going back to anything like the plantation system faced fierce resistance. Haitians had been afraid that U.S. investors were trying to convert the economy back into a plantation-based one, since U.S. businesses had been amassing land and evicting rural peasants from their family land. Rural Haitians formed armies that roamed around the countryside, stealing from farmers and raping women. The motivation of the US occupation of Haiti was partly to protect investments and to prevent European countries from gaining too much power in the area. One stated justification for the occupation had been ending the practice of enslaving children as domestic servants in Haiti; however, the United States also then reinstituted the practice of forced labor under the corvée system.

As had occurred under the regimes of Dessalines and Christophe, unfree labor was again employed in a public works program, this time ordered by the U.S. Admiral William Banks Caperton. In 1916, the U.S. occupiers employed the corvée system of forced labor allowed by Haiti's 1864 Code Rural until 1918. Since the Haitian resistance fighters, or Cacos, hid out in remote, mountainous areas and waged guerrilla-style warfare against the Marines, the military needed roads built to find and fight them. To build the roads, laborers were forcibly taken from their homes, bound together with rope into chain gangs and sometimes beaten and abused, or even killed if they resisted. Peasants were told they would be paid for their labor and given food, working near their homes — but sometimes the promised food and wages were meager or altogether absent. Corvée was highly unpopular; Haitians widely believed that whites had returned to Haiti to force them back into slavery. The brutality of the forced labor system strengthened the Cacos; many Haitians escaped to the mountains to join them, and many more lent their help and support. Reports of the abuses led the commander of the Marines to order an end to the practice in 1918; however, it continued illegally in the north until it was discovered — no one faced punishment for the infraction. With corvée no longer available, the U.S. turned to prison labor, with men sometimes being arrested for this purpose when there were too few laborers available in prison. The occupation lasted until 1934.

== Modern day ==
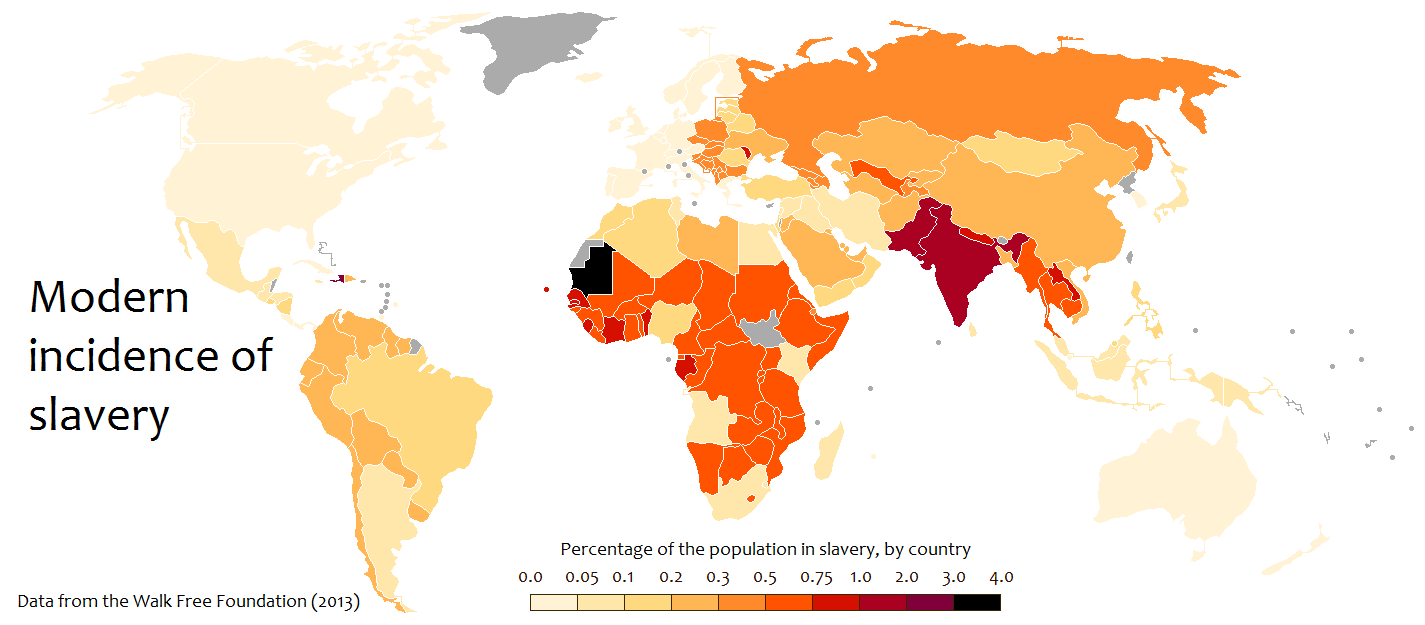
Haiti has the second-highest incidence of slavery in the world, behind only Mauritania. (Estimates from the Walk Free Foundation.)

Even though slavery has been prohibited for more than a century, many criminal organizations have practiced human trafficking and slave trade.

Slavery is still widespread in Haiti today. According to the 2014 Global Slavery Index, Haiti has an estimated 237,700 enslaved persons making it the country with the second-highest prevalence of slavery in the world, behind only Mauritania.

Haiti has more human trafficking than any other Central or South American country. According to the United States Department of State 2013 Trafficking in Persons Report, "Haiti is a major source, passage, and destination country for men, women, and children subjected to forced labor and sex slavery."

Haitians are trafficked out of Haiti and into the neighboring Dominican Republic, as well as to other countries such as Ecuador, Bolivia, Argentina, Brazil, and North American countries as well. Haiti is also a transit country for victims of trafficking en route to the United States. After the 2010 Haiti earthquake, human trafficking has drastically increased. While trafficking often implies moving, particularly smuggling people across borders, it only requires "the use of force, fraud, or coercion to exploit a person for profit," and it is understood to be a form of slavery.

For this reason both houses of Haitian Parliament, the Senate (upper house) and the Chamber of Deputies (lower house) are making significant efforts to the elimination of slavery and human trafficking.

=== Children ===
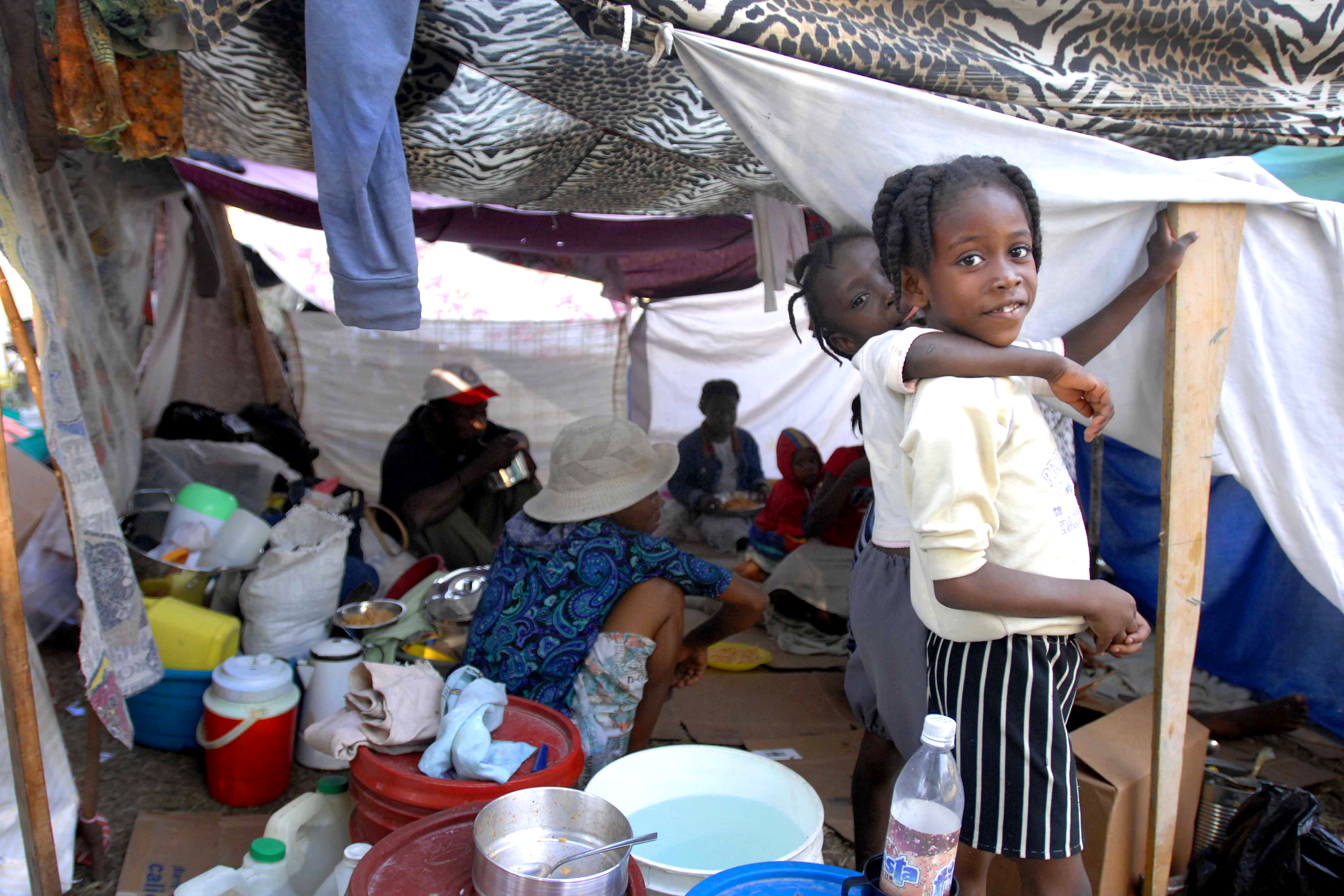
Internally displaced women and girls living in refugee camps after the 2010 earthquake are at particularly high risk for enslavement.

Child trafficking is a substantial part of the human trafficking crisis in Haiti. One major form of child trafficking and child slavery, affecting an estimated 300,000 Haitian children, is called the restavek system, in which children are forced to work as domestic servants.

The restavek system accounts for the lion's share of human trafficking in Haiti. Families send the children into other households, exchanging their labor for upbringing. Impoverished rural parents hope for education and a better life for their children in the city, sending them to wealthier (or at least less poor) households. Increasingly, children enter domestic servitude when a parent dies. Paid middlemen may act as recruiters, fetching the children for the host families. Unlike slaves in the traditional sense, restaveks are not bought or sold or owned, could run away or return to their families, and are typically released from servitude when they become adults; however, the restavek system is commonly understood to be a form of slavery.

Some restaveks do receive proper nutrition and education, but they are in the minority. Restaveks' labor includes hauling water and wood, grocery shopping, laundry, house cleaning, and childcare. Restaveks work long hours (commonly 10 to 14 a day) under harsh conditions, are frequently denied schooling, and are at severe risk of malnutrition and verbal, physical, and sexual abuse. Beatings are a daily occurrence for most restaveks, and most of the girls are sexually abused, which puts them at an elevated risk for HIV infection. Those who are thrown out or run away from their host homes become street children, vulnerable to exploitation including forced prostitution. Those who return to their families may be unwelcome as an added economic burden or shamed and stigmatized for having been a restavek. The trauma of abuse and the deprivation of free time and normal childhood experiences can stunt a child's development and have long-lasting effects.

The term restavek comes from the French "to live with", rester avec. The practice has been around since the end of the revolution but became common in the 20th century as a way for rural people to cope with poverty. The number of restaveks increased after the 2010 earthquake, when many children became orphans or were separated from their families. The U.S. Department of State estimated in 2013 that between 150,000 and 500,000 children were in domestic servitude, accounting for most of Haiti's human trafficking. About 19% of Haitian children ages 5 to 17 live away from their parents, and about 8.2% are considered domestic workers. In one survey, restaveks were present in 5.3% of households by their heads' own admission. In one study, 16% of Haitian children surveyed admitted to being restaveks. It is estimated that an additional 3,000 Haitian children are domestic servants in the Dominican Republic.

Children are also trafficked out of Haiti by organizations claiming to be adoption agencies, into countries including the U.S. – but some are actually kidnapped from their families. This practice was particularly widespread in the chaos following the 2010 earthquake. While women migrants were vulnerable during this time, the situation of children was underscored because of the phenomenon of irregular adoptions (one facet of human trafficking) of supposed "orphans" through the Dominican Republic. International outcry arose when on January 29, 2010, ten members of the American New Life Children's Refuge were arrested trying to take 33 Haitian children out of the country to an orphanage—but the children were not orphans. Traffickers pretending to be workers from legitimate charitable organizations have been known to trick refugee families, convincing them that their children would be taken to safety and cared for. In some cases, traffickers run "orphanages" or "care facilities" for children that are difficult to distinguish from legitimate organizations. Children may be smuggled across the border by paid traffickers claiming to be their parents and subsequently forced into laboring for begging rings or as servants. Child trafficking spurred UNICEF to fund the Brigade de Protection des Mineurs, a branch of the national police that exists to monitor cases of child trafficking, to watch borders and refugee camps for such activity. Children in refugee camps are in particular danger of other kinds of trafficking as well, including sexual exploitation.

=== Sex slavery ===
Although a majority of the modern-day slavery cases in Haiti are due to the practice of the restavek system, trafficking for sexual exploitation in Haiti is a widespread and pressing issue. In recent years, Haiti has become a magnet for sex tourists. Sex slavery includes the practices of coercion, forced prostitution, and trafficking for any sexual purposes. Sheldon Zhang defines sex trafficking as "migrants [who] are transported with the intent to perform sexual services...and in which the smuggling process is enabled through the use of force, fraud, or coercion." Most victims are trafficked for prostitution, but others are used for pornography and stripping. Children tend to be trafficked within their own countries, while young women may be trafficked internally or internationally, sometimes with the consent of their husbands or other family members.

Suspicion was raised in 2007 that UN peacekeeping forces (deployed in 2004 to quell political instability) were creating an increased demand for sex trafficking after 114 UN soldiers were expelled from Haiti for using prostitutes. In its 2007 yearly report, the US State Department found an increase in sex trafficking into Haiti of women and girls to work as prostitutes for peacekeepers. It was the first mention in such a report of women being trafficked into Haiti from the Dominican Republic for sex work.

=== Contributing factors ===
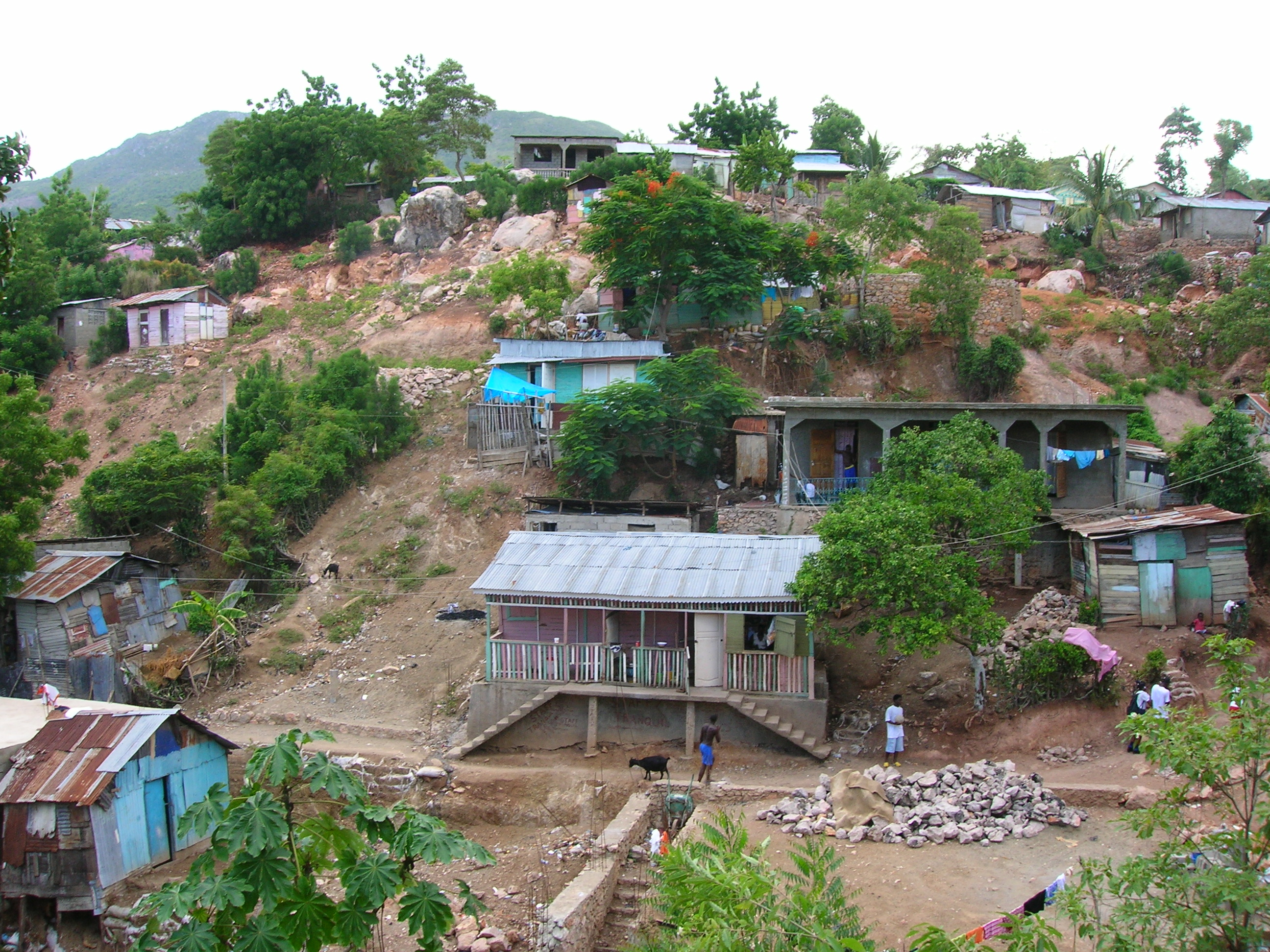
Slums in the area of Bas-Ravine, in the northern part of Cap-Haïtien

The 2013 Trafficking in Persons Report identified several individual and structural factors that contribute to the persistence of human trafficking to, through, and out of Haiti, as well as throughout Latin America and the Caribbean. The Haitians at gravest risk of victimization by human traffickers are its poorest people, particularly children. In Haiti, the poorest country in the Western hemisphere, over half the population lives on less than a dollar a day and over three quarters live on less than two dollars a day. Severe poverty, combined with a lack of social services such as education and basic healthcare, increases a child's vulnerability to modern slavery. Factors that increase a child's likelihood of becoming a restavek include illness or loss of one or both parents, lack of access to clean water, lack of educational opportunities, and having access to family in a city. In addition to poverty, individual factors that can lead to exploitation include unemployment, illiteracy, poor educational opportunities, a history of physical or sexual abuse, homelessness, and drug abuse. These individual factors "push" people toward pathways of human trafficking and modern-day slavery. Oftentimes men, women and children accept slave-like work conditions because there is little hope for improvement and they need to survive. Some cross national borders in search of positive opportunities, but instead find themselves a part of the exploited work force. Additionally, factors that make people easy targets for traffickers make enslavement more likely. One group at high risk for sexual enslavement and other types of forced labor is internally displaced persons, particularly women and children living in refugee camps, which offer little security. The estimated 10% of undocumented Haitians, whose births go unreported, are at especially high risk of enslavement.

Human trafficking along the Haitian-Dominican border persists because both sending and receiving countries have a huge economic stake in continuing the stream of undocumented migration, which directly leads to trafficking. Trafficking is a profitable business for traffickers both in Haiti and the Dominican Republic. As long as large economic and social disparities such as poverty, social exclusion, environmental crises, and political instability exist between the two countries, the trade will continue.

There are also structural factors outside of the individual that explain the persistence of modern-day slavery in Haiti. The U.S. State Department's Trafficking in Persons Report has identified the following eight structural factors that contribute to human trafficking in Latin America and the Caribbean: (1) the high demand for domestic servants, agricultural laborers, sex workers, and factory labor; (2) political, social, or economic crises, as well as natural disasters such as the January 2010 earthquake; (3) lingering machismo (chauvinistic attitudes and practices) that tends to lead to discrimination against women and girls; (4) existence of established trafficking networks with sophisticated recruitment methods; (5) public corruption, especially complicity between law enforcement and border agents with traffickers and smugglers of people; (6) restrictive immigration policies in some destination countries that have limited the opportunities for legal migration flows to occur; (7) government disinterest in the issue of human trafficking; and (8) limited economic opportunities for women. The restavek tradition is perpetuated by widespread tolerance for the practice throughout Haiti. Other contributing factors to the restavek system include poverty and lack of access to contraception, education, and employment in the countryside. Poor rural families with many children have few opportunities to feed and educate them, leaving few options other than servitude in the city.

=== Haitian–Dominican border ===
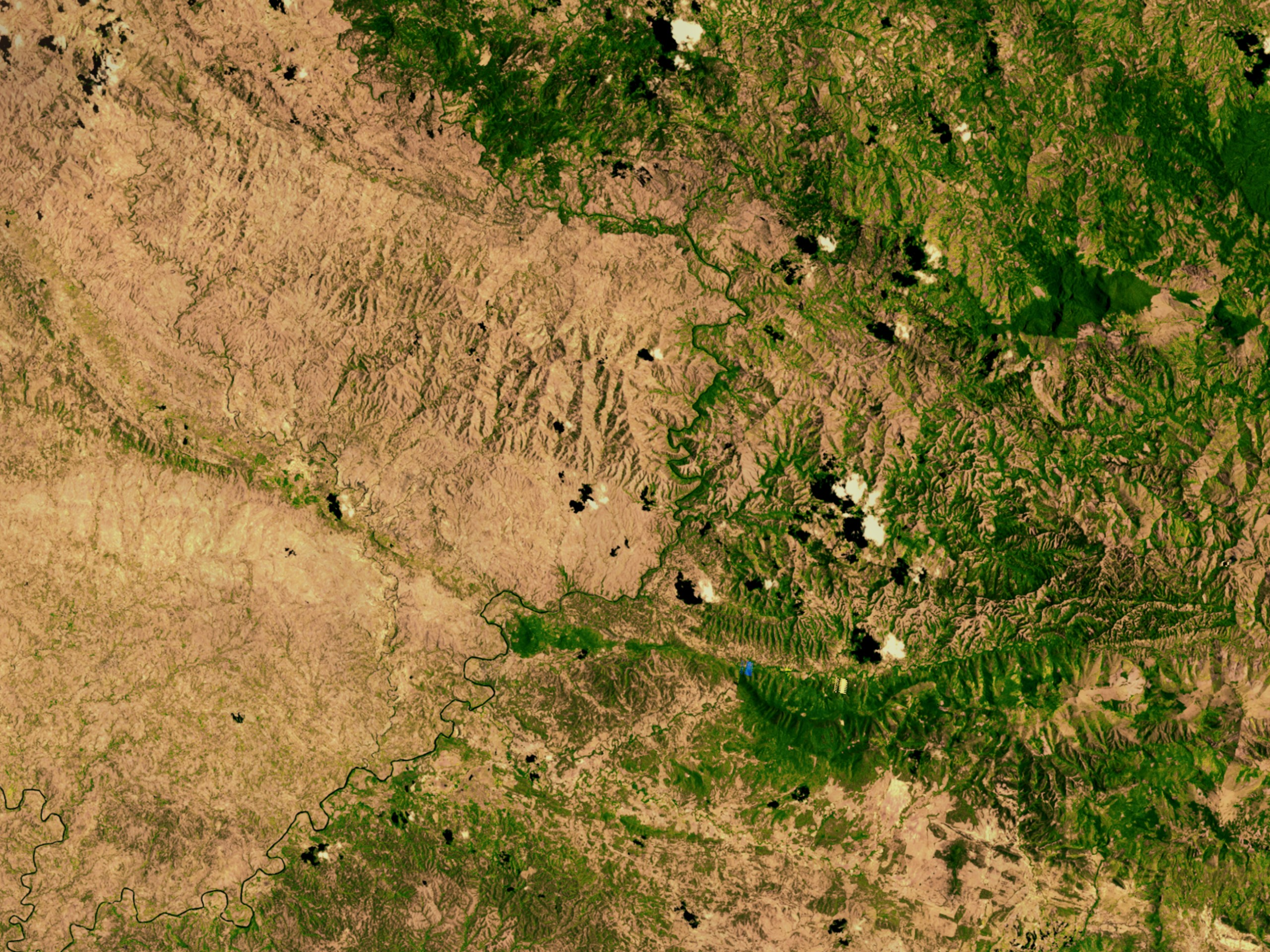
Satellite image showing the border between Haiti (left) and the Dominican Republic (right).

For decades Haitians have been crossing the Haitian-Dominican border for various reasons, including voluntary and involuntary migration, long- and short-term residence in the Dominican Republic, legal and illegal entry, smuggling, and human trafficking. Haitians move across the Haitian-Dominican border in search of opportunities and they are highly vulnerable to exploitation. In fact, the Dominican Republic has one of the worst records of human rights abuses, including human trafficking, against migrant workers in all of the Caribbean. Haitians in the Dominican Republic are widely disparaged as a migrant minority because of the countries' proximity. During the dictatorial reign of Jean-Claude Duvalier in the 1970s and 80s, he sold Haitians at bulk rates to work on sugar plantations in the Dominican Republic.

Most people who move across the border are women and girls. The migration of Haitian women to the Dominican Republic is intrinsically linked to the "feminization of migrations" which is in turn part of the "new Haitian immigration," brought about by changes in labor markets as well as by the fragile situation of women and their families in Haiti. Women migrants are particularly vulnerable to human trafficking, violence and illicit smuggling. When attempting to cross the border, Haitian women are at risk of being robbed, assaulted, raped and murdered, at the hands of smugglers, delinquents and traffickers, both Dominican and Haitian. Given this threat of violence, women turn to alternative, unofficial routes and dependence upon hired buscones (informal scouts), cousins and other distant family to accompany them across the border. These hired smugglers who have promised to help them, often through force and coercion, trick them instead into forced domestic labor in private homes in Santo Domingo, the capital of Dominican Republic. Hired buscones also sell women and children into the sex slave trade within the Dominican Republic (brothels and other venues) or into sexual slavery as an export. Often, mothers need their young children to help provide for the family, which puts the children in vulnerable positions and allows them to fall prey to predators and traffickers. The number of children smuggled into the Dominican Republic is not known, but a UNICEF estimate placed the number at 2,000 in 2009 alone. Haitian officials report that there are three main fates met by children trafficked out of Haiti: domestic work, prostitution, and organ harvesting.

Women from the Dominican Republic have also reportedly been trafficked into Haiti to be sex slaves.

=== Government action ===
HAITI	Ratified
Forced Labour Convention	Yes
Supplementary Convention on the Abolition of Slavery	Yes
International Covenant on Civil and Political Rights	Yes
Convention on the Rights of the Child	Yes
Worst Forms of Child Labour Convention	Yes
CRC Optional Protocol on the Sale of Children	Yes
UN Trafficking Protocol	No
Domestic Work Convention	No

The 2014 U.S. Trafficking in Persons Report placed Haiti on the Tier 2 Watch List. Tier 2 Watchlist placement is given to countries whose governments do not fully comply with the Trafficking Victims Protection Act's (TVPA) minimum standards, but are making significant efforts to bring themselves into compliance with those standards, and the number of victims of severe forms of trafficking is very significant or significantly increasing. Some of Haiti's efforts to combat modern-day slavery include ratifying several key conventions, including the Universal Declaration on Human Rights (UHDR), the Convention on the Rights of the Child (CRC), the International Labour Organization (ILO) Convention Concerning the Prohibition and Immediate Action for the Elimination of the Worst Forms of Child Labor, and the ILO Minimum Age Convention. In 2014 Haiti ratified the Optional Protocol on the Sale of Children. Conventions such as these, if enforced, could help to combat human trafficking. In 2000, Haiti signed the UN Protocol to Prevent, Suppress and Punish Trafficking in Persons, especially Women and Children, but has not ratified it. Haiti has not ratified the Convention on Domestic Workers.

==== Anti-restavek action ====
In accordance with these international conventions, Haitian law prohibits abuse, violence, exploitation and servitude of children of any kind that is likely to harm their safety, health, or morals. Additionally, it declares that all children have the right to an education and to be free from degrading and inhumane treatment. Enacted in 2003, Article 335 of the Haitian Labor code prohibits the employment of children under the age of 15. Furthermore, an Act passed in June 2003 specifically outlawed the placement of children into restavek service. The law states that a child in domestic service must be treated in the same manner as the biological children of the family; however it does not contain any criminal sanctions for those who violate its provisions. Despite the enactment of these laws, the practice of restavek persists and grows. Political instability and lack of resources hinder efforts to curtail trafficking in children.

==== Prosecution and protection ====
The government took steps to legally address the issue of trafficking of women and children by submitting a bill to Parliament, in response to its ratification of the Palermo Protocol which required it. In 2014 the law CL/2014-0010 was passed, criminalizing trafficking with penalties of up to 15 years of imprisonment. However, enforcement remains elusive. Impediments to combating human trafficking include widespread corruption, the lack of quick responses to cases with trafficking indicators, the slow pace of the judicial branch to resolve criminal cases, and scant funding for government agencies.

People displaced by the 2010 earthquake are at an increased risk of sex trafficking and forced labor. The international protections in place for the internally displaced, primarily the 1998 UN Office for the Coordination of Humanitarian Affairs Guiding Principles on Internal Displacement, do not apply to earthquake survivors who have crossed an international border. There is nothing protecting the externally displaced, which creates significant protection gaps for those most vulnerable to trafficking – girls and young women – who are treated as migration offenders rather than forced migrants in need of protection. No temporary protected status has been created or granted in the Dominican Republic.

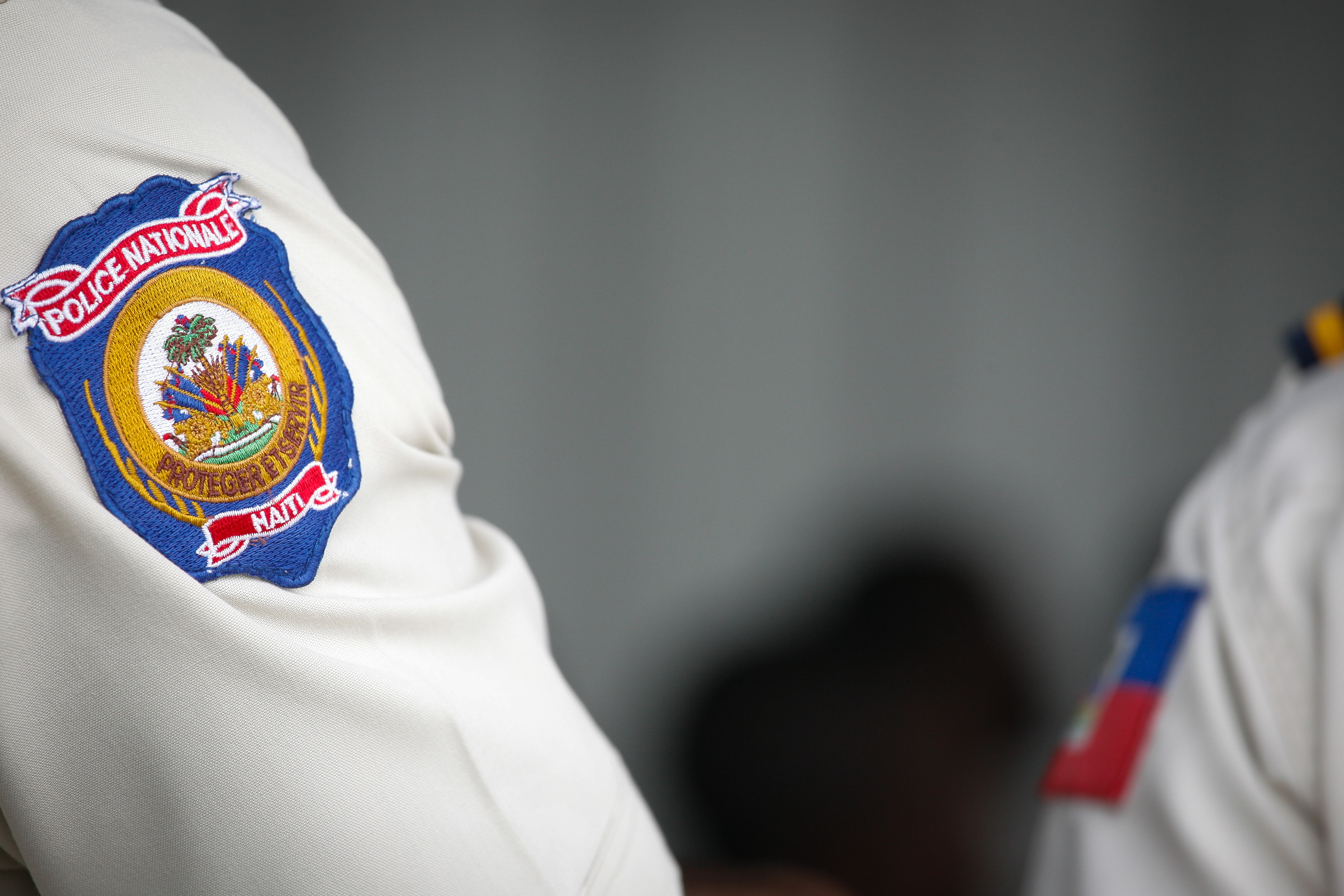
Haitian Police

Since the 2010 Haiti earthquake, international aid and domestic effort has been focused on relief and recovery, and as a result few resources have been set aside for combating modern day slavery. There are no government-run shelters to aid human trafficking victims. The government refers victims to non-governmental organizations (NGOs) for services like food and medical care. The majority of victim services are provided by Haitian NGOs such as Foyer l'Escale, Centre d'Action pour le Developpement and Organisation des Jeunes Filles en Action that provide accommodation, educational and psycho-social services to victims. Additionally, the IOM has been cooperating with local NGOs and the Haitian Ministry of Social Affairs, the Institute for Social Welfare and Research or the Brigade for the Protection of Minors of the Haitian national police, to tackle human trafficking.

==== Prevention ====
The government has made efforts to prevent and reduce human trafficking. In June 2012, the IBESR (Institut du BienEtre Social et de Recherches) launched a human trafficking hotline and conducted a campaign to raise public awareness about child labor, child trafficking, and child sexual abuse. The government made a hotline to report cases of abuse of restaveks. In December 2012, the government created a national commission for the Elimination of the Worst Forms of Child Labor, which involved launching a public awareness campaign on child labor, and highlighting a national day against restavek abuse. In early 2013, the government created an inter-ministerial working group on human trafficking, chaired by the Judicial Affairs Director of the Foreign Affairs ministry, to coordinate all anti-trafficking executive branch initiatives.

== Reparations for slavery ==
Reparations for slavery is the application of the concept of reparations to victims of slavery and/or their descendants. In Haiti this has not occurred, but instead, Haiti paid for more than 120 years to France in order to obtain a "formal recognition" of freedom by France.

=== Haitian independence debt ===
In July 1825, Charles X of France, during a period of restoration of the French monarchy, sent a fleet to Haiti. The fleet carried French diplomats who demanded 150 million franc indemnity to be paid by Haiti in claims over property – including Haitian slaves – that was lost through the Haitian Revolution in return for diplomatic recognition; Haiti accepted the claim, known today as Haiti indemnity controversy. The payment was later reduced to 90 million francs in 1838, comparable to well over US$34 billion as of 2024.

President Jean-Pierre Boyer agreed to a treaty by which France formally recognized the independence of the nation in exchange for a payment of 150 million francs. By an order of 17 April 1826, the King of France renounced his rights of sovereignty and formally recognized the independence of Haiti. The enforced payments to France hampered Haiti's economic growth for centuries, and due to the sheer size of the sum asked from the nation, Haiti was forced to borrow heavily from Western banks at extremely high interest rates to repay the debt. Although the amount of the reparations was reduced to 90 million in 1838, by 1900 80% of Haiti's government spending was debt repayment and the country did not finish repaying it until 1947. The New York Times reported the payments cost Haiti much of its development potential, removing about $21 to $115 billion of growth from Haiti (about one to eight times the nation's total economy) over two centuries, according to calculations conducted by 15 prominent economists.

=== Reparations for slavery in Haiti ===
In 2004, the Haitian government demanded that France repay Haiti for the millions of dollars (tens of billions in today's money) paid between 1825 and 1947 as compensation for the property loss of French slaveholders and landowners as a result of the slaves' freedom.

== See also ==
- Human rights in Haiti
- Women's rights in Haiti
- Dominican Republic–Haiti relations

== Bibliography ==
- Abbott, E. (2011). Haiti: A Shattered Nation. Penguin Books. ISBN 978-1-4683-0160-1 – via Google Books.
- Abbot, E. (2010). Sugar: A Bittersweet History. Penguin Books. ISBN 978-1-59020-772-7 – via Google Books.
- Accilien, Cécile; Adams, Jessica; Méléance, Elmide (2006). Revolutionary Freedoms: A History of Survival, Strength and Imagination in Haiti. Educa Vision Inc. ISBN 978-1-58432-293-1 – via Google Books.
- Adamson, E.M. (2007). MUDHA: History of Haitian and Dominican-Haitian Women's Organizing in the Dominican Republic. ISBN 978-0-549-13413-8 – via Google Books.
- Blackburn, R. (1998). The Making of New World Slavery: From the Baroque to the Modern,1492–1800. Verso Books. p. 459. ISBN 978-1-85984-195-2 – via Google Books.
- Chrisp, P. (2006). DK Discoveries: Christopher Columbus. Penguin Books. ISBN 978-0-7566-8616-1 – via Google Books.
- Dubois, L. (2012). Haiti: The Aftershocks of History. New York, NY: Metropolitan Books.
- Ferguson, J. (1988). Papa Doc, Baby Doc: Haiti and the Duvaliers. John Wiley & Sons, Limited. ISBN 978-0-631-16579-8 – via Google Books.
- Ferrer, A. (2014). Freedom's Mirror: Cuba and Haiti in the Age of Revolution. Cambridge University Press. ISBN 978-1-316-14799-3 – via Google Books.
- Loewen, J.W. (2008). Lies My Teacher Told Me: Everything Your American History Textbook Got Wrong. The New Press. ISBN 978-1-59558-326-0 – via Google Books.
- Meltzer, M. (1971). Slavery: A World History. Da Capo Press. ISBN 978-0-306-80536-3 – via Google Books.
- Nicholls, D. (1996). From Dessalines to Duvalier: Race, Colour, and National Independence in Haiti. Rutgers University Press. p. 54. ISBN 978-0-8135-2240-1.
- Palmiotto, M.J. (2014). Combating Human Trafficking: A Multidisciplinary Approach. CRC Press. ISBN 978-1-4822-4039-9 – via Google Books.
- Reinhardt, C.A. (2008). Claims to Memory: Beyond Slavery and Emancipation in the French Caribbean. Berghahn Books. ISBN 978-1-84545-412-8 – via Google Books.
- Renda, M.A. (2001). Taking Haiti: Military Occupation and the Culture of U.S. Imperialism, 1915-1940. University of North Carolina Press. ISBN 978-0-8078-6218-6 – via Google Books.
- Rodriguez, J.P. (1997). The Historical Encyclopedia of World Slavery. 1. A - K. ABC-CLIO. ISBN 978-0-87436-885-7 – via Google Books.
- Rodriguez, J.P. (2007). Encyclopedia of Slave Resistance and Rebellion. Greenwood Publishing Group. ISBN 978-0-313-33272-2 – via Google Books.
- Skinner, E.B. (2008). A Crime So Monstrous: Face-to-Face with Modern-Day Slavery. Simon & Schuster. ISBN 978-0-7432-9007-4 – via Google Books.
- Sommerfelt, T.; Pederson, J. (2011). "Child labor in Haiti". In Hindman, H.D. (ed.). The World of Child Labor: An Historical and Regional Survey. M.E. Sharpe. ISBN 978-0-7656-2647-9 – via Google Books.
