= List of cities in Haiti =

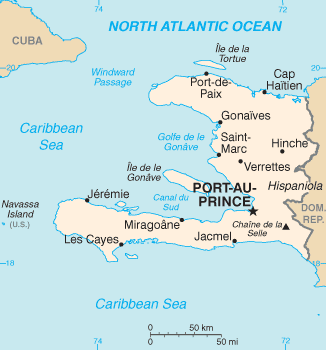
Map of Haiti

This article shows a list of cities in Haiti.

== List ==
Rank	City	2015 Estimate	2009 Estimate	2003 Census	Arrondissement	Department
1	Port-au-Prince	977,790	875,978	733,840	Port-Au-Prince	Ouest
2	Carrefour	501,768	430,250	366,137	Port-Au-Prince	Ouest
3	Delmas	395,260	359,451	307,933	Port-Au-Prince	Ouest
4	Pétion-Ville	327,923	271,175	200,725	Port-Au-Prince	Ouest
5	Gonaïves	278,584	228,725	158,979	Gonaives	Artibonite
6	Cite Soleil	265,072	241,055		Port-Au-Prince	Ouest
7	Cap-Haïtien	170,994	155,505	129,742	Cap-Haitien	Nord
8	Saint-Marc	149,653	122,747	85,329	Saint-Marc	Artibonite
9	Croix-des-Bouquets	139,728	84,812	23,435	Croix-des-Bouquets	Ouest
10	Petit-Goâve	123,805	76,243	24,992	Leogane	Ouest
11	Léogane	122,650	78,477	22,779	Leogane	Ouest
12	Port-de-Paix	121,220	99,580	70,742	Port-De-Paix	Nord-Ouest
13	Tabarre	108,877	99,011		Port-Au-Prince	Ouest
14	Petite Anse	98,042	89,155	74,316	Cap-Haitien	Nord
15	Les Cayes	86,780	71,236	55,276	Les Cayes	Sud
16	Ouanaminthe	70,905	58,250	43,774	Ouanaminthe	Nord-Est
17	Cabaret	59,956	36,120	11,304	Arcahaie	Ouest
18	Saintard	55,073	32,906	10,768	Arcahaie	Ouest
19	Limbé	54,170	39,756	24,346	Limbe	Nord
20	Anse à Galets	49,050	39,783	13,662	Gonave	Ouest
21	Jacmel	48,248	39,643	29,834	Jacmel	Sud-Est
22	Grand-Goâve	42,482	19,874	6,529	Leogane	Ouest
23	Petite Rivière de l'Artibonite	42,436	35,007	24,336	Dessalines	Artibonite
24	Jérémie	42,388	34,788	30,591	Jeremie	Grand'Anse
25	Hinche	37,370	30,595	23,262	Hinche	Centre
26	Gros Morne	37,139	30,511	21,207	Gros Morne	Artibonite
27	Saint-Michel-de-l'Attalaye	37,007	30,412	21,458	Marmelade	Artibonite
28	Saint-Louis-du-Nord	36,602	30,037	21,339	Saint-Louis-Du-Nord	Nord-Ouest
29	Desdunes	33,222	27,293	18,970	Dessalines	Artibonite
30	Dessalines	31,915	26,219	18,224	Dessalines	Artibonite
31	Trou du Nord	26,542	21,805	16,386	Trou du Nord	Nord-Est
32	Vialet	25,261	15,554	5,096	Leogane	Ouest
33	Arcahaie	24,600	14,702	4,815	Arcahaie	Ouest
34	Kenscoff	23,231	13,415	4,665	Port-Au-Prince	Ouest
35	L'Estère	22,847	18,770	13,046	Gonaives	Artibonite
36	Fort-Liberté	22,416	18,417	13,848	Fort-Liberte	Nord-Est
37	Gressier	21,800	13,043	3,886	Port-Au-Prince	Ouest
38	Fonds Parisien	21,419	12,532	4,449	Croix-des-Bouquets	Ouest
39	Croix des Missions	21,406	19,466	16,438	Port-Au-Prince	Ouest
40	Thomassin	20,798	17,195	11,736	Port-Au-Prince	Ouest
41	Limonade	20,281	14,886	9,117	Cap-Haitien	Nord
42	Plaisance	19,997	14,677	8,986	Plaisance	Nord
43	Fonds-Verrettes	19,902	10,345	3,399	Croix-des-Bouquets	Ouest
44	Mirebalais	18,942	15,562	11,831	Mirebalais	Centre
45	Liancourt	18,574	15,211	10,578	Saint-Marc	Artibonite
46	Thomazeau	17,811	10,370	3,572	Croix-des-Bouquets	Ouest
47	Grande Rivière du Nord	17,672	12,969	7,941	Grande Riviere du Nord	Nord
48	Saint-Raphaël	17,550	12,879	7,887	Saint-Raphael	Nord
49	Verrettes	17,038	14,015	9,749	Saint-Marc	Artibonite
50	Pignon	16,001	11,744	7,190	Saint-Raphael	Nord
51	Terrier Rouge	15,248	12,226	9,195	Trou du Nord	Nord-Est
52	Port Margot	14,528	10,659	6,525	Borgne	Nord
53	Thomassique	14,057	11,548	8,780	Cerca La Source	Centre
54	Anse Rouge	14,052	11,645	8,055	Gros Morne	Artibonite
55	Anse d'Hainault	14,030	11,527	10,142	Anse d'Hainault	Grand'Anse
56	Maïssade	13,634	11,234	8,542	Hinche	Centre
57	Miragoane	13,557	10,947	9,634	Miragoane	Nippes
58	Belladères	13,099	10,718	8,148	Lascahobas	Centre
59	Ganthier	12,677	7,416	2,338	Croix-des-Bouquets	Ouest
60	Dondon	11,659	8,557	5,240	Saint-Raphael	Nord
61	Desarmes	11,544	9,514	6,600	Saint-Marc	Artibonite
62	Jean Rabel	11,298	9,204	6,541	Mole Saint-Nicolas	Nord-Ouest
63	Thomonde	11,236	9,231	7,018	Hinche	Centre
64	Dame Marie	11,154	9,163	8,061	Anse d'Hainault	Grand'Anse
65	Plaine du Nord	11,145	8,180	5,006	Acul du Nord	Nord
66	Acul du Nord	10,853	7,967	4,880	Acul du Nord	Nord
67	Lascahobas	10,401	8,545	6,497	Lascahobas	Centre
68	Trouin	10,277	6,567	1,898	Leogane	Ouest
69	Anse à Pitre	9,791	8,044	6,057	Belle Anse	Sud-Est
70	Les Anglais	9,483	7,791	5,954	Chardonnieres	Sud
71	Marmelade	9,379	7,705	5,355	Marmelade	Artibonite
72	Grand Bassin	9,207	7,865	5,903	Trou du Nord	Nord-Est
73	Aquin	9,192	7,707	5,889	Aquin	Sud
74	Ferrier	8,972	7,371	5,539	Fort-Liberte	Nord-Est
75	Bas Limbé	8,912	6,541	4,005	Limbe	Nord
76	Montrouis	8,630	7,287	5,053	Saint-Marc	Artibonite
77	Milot	8,619	6,325	3,874	Acul du Nord	Nord
78	Port-à-Piment	8,438	6,932	5,297	Coteaux	Sud
79	Borgne	8,028	5,892	3,608	Borgne	Nord
80	Pilate	7,899	5,795	3,549	Plaisance	Nord
81	Cerca La Source	7,733	6,353	4,830	Cerca La Source	Centre
82	Tiburon	7,424	6,066	4,637	Chardonnieres	Sud
83	Marigot	7,355	6,043	4,549	Jacmel	Sud-Est
84	Anse-à-Foleur	7,055	5,796	4,117	Saint-Louis-Du-Nord	Nord-Ouest
85	Bassin Bleu	7,002	5,752	4,087	Port-De-Paix	Nord-Ouest
86	Thiotte	6,844	5,623	4,232	Belle Anse	Sud-Est
87	Perches	6,729	5,528	4,155	Fort-Liberte	Nord-Est
88	La Chapelle	6,419	5,273	3,665	Saint-Marc	Artibonite
89	Pointe à Raquette	6,301	3,820	1,193	Gonave	Ouest
90	Beaumont	6,017	4,943	4,349	Corail	Grand'Anse
91	Cerca Carvajal	5,633	4,628	3,518	Hinche	Centre
92	Pestel	5,603	4,603	788	Corail	Grand'Anse
93	La Victoire	5,516	4,050		Saint-Raphael	Nord
94	Ennery	5,486	4,507	3,132	Gonaives	Artibonite
95	Chardonnières	5,443	4,311	3,295	Chardonnieres	Sud
96	Saut d'Eau	5,268	4,328	3,290	Mirebalais	Centre
97	Ranquitte	4,955	3,637	2,227	Saint-Raphael	Nord
98	Grande Saline	4,946	4,063	2,824	Dessalines	Artibonite
99	Camp-Perrin	4,925	4,046	3,092	Les Cayes	Sud
100	Savane à Roche	4,868	3,855	2,676	Dessalines	Artibonite
101	Fonds des Nègres	4,857	3,990	3,512	Miragoane	Nippes
102	Savanette	4,843	3,979	3,025	Lascahobas	Centre
103	Mont-Organisé	4,785	3,931	2,954	Ouanaminthe	Nord-Est
104	Quartier Morin	4,766	3,500	2,142	Cap-Haitien	Nord
105	Côteaux	4,729	3,856	2,949	Coteaux	Sud
106	Carice	4,711	3,870	2,909	Vallieres	Nord-Est
107	Les Irois	4,696	3,870	3,435	Anse d'Hainault	Grand'Anse
108	Chambellan	4,675	3,841	3,380	Jeremie	Grand'Anse
109	Belle Anse	4,508	3,704	2,788	Belle Anse	Sud-Est
110	Corail	4,489	3,688	3,245	Corail	Grand'Anse
111	Chantal	4,331	3,558	2,719	Les Cayes	Sud
112	Anse-à-Veau	4,301	3,457	2,233	Anse-a-Veau	Nippes
113	Petit Trou de Nippes	4,189	3,430	3,016	Anse-a-Veau	Nippes
114	Môle Saint Nicolas	4,149	3,408	2,421	Mole Saint-Nicolas	Nord-Ouest
115	Vieux Bourg d'Aquin	4,083	3,162	2,418	Aquin	Sud
116	Camp Coq	4,077	2,991	1,830	Limbe	Nord
117	Bainet	4,026	3,308	2,490	Bainet	Sud-Est
118	Cayes-Jacmel	3,957	3,251	2,447	Jacmel	Sud-Est
119	Petit Bourg de Port-Margot	3,824	2,807	1,723	Borgne	Nord
120	Garcasse	3,755	3,073	2,674	Anse d'Hainault	Grand'Anse
121	Petit Bourg de Borgne	3,669	2,694	1,648	Borgne	Nord
122	Robillard	3,666	2,691	1,649	Acul du Nord	Nord
123	Roche-à-Bâteau	3,502	2,877	2,199	Coteaux	Sud
124	Bois Laurence	3,480	2,104	2,149	Belle Anse	Sud-Est
125	Banane	3,480	2,860	1,579	Vallieres	Nord-Est
126	Bombardopolis	3,468	2,849	2,024	Mole Saint-Nicolas	Nord-Ouest
127	Moron	3,437	2,816	2,461	Jeremie	Grand'Anse
128	Saint-Louis-du-Sud	3,325	2,732	2,157	Aquin	Sud
129	Plaisance du Sud	3,321	2,728		Anse-a-Veau	Nippes
130	Saint-Michel	3,296	2,899	2,549	Miragoane	Nippes
131	Marfranc	3,278	2,811	2,486	Jeremie	Grand'Anse
132	Caracol	3,274	2,690	2,021	Trou du Nord	Nord-Est
133	Grand Boucan	3,039	2,498	1,784	Baraderes	Nippes
134	Bayeux	3,028	2,222	1,360	Borgne	Nord
135	Arnaud	2,879	2,366		Anse-a-Veau	Nippes
136	Bahon	2,841	2,085	1,277	Grande Riviere du Nord	Nord
137	Randel	2,829	2,485	1,899	Chardonnieres	Sud
138	Chansolme	2,812	2,310	1,641	Port-De-Paix	Nord-Ouest
139	Baptiste	2,783	2,330	1,772	Lascahobas	Centre
140	Baie de Henne	2,658	2,183	1,551	Mole Saint-Nicolas	Nord-Ouest
141	Bonneau	2,627	2,198	1,560	Saint-Louis-Du-Nord	Nord-Ouest
142	Grand Ravine	2,614	2,110		Anse-a-Veau	Nippes
143	Torbeck	2,584	2,034	1,555	Les Cayes	Sud
144	Vallières	2,576	2,037	1,531	Vallieres	Nord-Est
145	Duffailly	2,568	2,093	1,590	Mirebalais	Centre
146	Fond Tortue	2,526	2,124		Baraderes	Nippes
147	Petite Rivière de Bayonnais	2,496	2,190	1,522	Gonaives	Artibonite
148	Acul Samedi	2,491	1,660	1,244	Fort-Liberte	Nord-Est
149	Cornillon	2,487	1,498	472	Croix-des-Bouquets	Ouest
150	Côtes de Fer	2,447	2,011	1,513	Bainet	Sud-Est
151	La Tortue	2,390	1,963	1,395	Port-De-Paix	Nord-Ouest
152	Port-Salut	2,326	1,911	1,460	Port-Sault	Sud
153	Mombin Crochu	2,317	2,659	2,000	Vallieres	Nord-Est
154	Cavaillon	2,274	1,868	1,476	Aquin	Sud
155	Baradères	2,189	1,750	1,538	Baraderes	Nippes
156	Damassin	2,163	1,806	1,378	Coteaux	Sud
157	Petite Rivière de Nippes	2,119	1,778	2,276	Miragoane	Nippes
158	Roseaux	2,117	1,739	1,530	Corail	Grand'Anse
159	Carrefour des Pères	2,112	1,550	948	Acul du Nord	Nord
160	Ile a Vache	2,066	1,698		Les Cayes	Sud
161	Derac	2,022	2,046	1,533	Fort-Liberte	Nord-Est
162	Charlier	2,011	1,615		Miragoane	Nippes
163	Bord de Mer de Jean Rabe	1,966	1,692	1,199	Mole Saint-Nicolas	Nord-Ouest
164	Cahouane	1,955	1,639	1,251	Chardonnieres	Sud
165	Arniquet	1,907	1,567	1,197	Port-Sault	Sud
166	Sainte-Suzanne	1,882	1,488	1,218	Les Cayes	Sud
167	Ducis	1,882	1,595	1,119	Trou du Nord	Nord-Est
168	Camp Louise	1,866	1,369	837	Acul du Nord	Nord
169	Bodarie	1,782	1,465	1,104	Belle Anse	Sud-Est
170	Bonbon	1,726	1,418	1,248	Jeremie	Grand'Anse
171	Baconnois	1,643	1,408		Anse-a-Veau	Nippes
172	L'Asile	1,631	1,356	1,194	Anse-a-Veau	Nippes
173	Terre Neuve	1,586	1,303	906	Gros Morne	Artibonite
174	Bord de Mer de Limonade	1,524	1,118	682	Cap-Haitien	Nord
175	Grosse Roche	1,520	1,328	998	Vallieres	Nord-Est
176	Changeux	1,501	1,264		Anse-a-Veau	Nippes
177	Louverture	1,420	1,133	861	Hinche	Centre
178	Sources Chaudes	1,396	1,046	812	Gros Morne	Artibonite
179	Lieve	1,368	1,173		Anse-a-Veau	Nippes
180	Abricots	1,353	1,112	978	Jeremie	Grand'Anse
181	Eaux Basses	1,318	1,082		Baraderes	Nippes
182	Capotille	1,302	1,069	804	Ouanaminthe	Nord-Est
183	Los Palis	1,265	1,145	869	Hinche	Centre
184	La Vallée	1,264	1,039	782	Jacmel	Sud-Est
185	Laborde	1,262	1,095		Les Cayes	Sud
186	Paillant	1,241	1,019	431	Miragoane	Nippes
187	Boucan Carré	1,236	1,033	786	Mirebalais	Centre
188	Saint-Jean-du-Sud	1,143	939	718	Port-Sault	Sud
189	Léon	1,131	847	752	Jeremie	Grand'Anse
190	Maniche	1,087	893	682	Les Cayes	Sud
191	Morisseau	994	770		Anse-a-Veau	Nippes
192	Grand Gosier	923	758	569	Belle Anse	Sud-Est
193	Bouzi	870	715		Miragoane	Nippes
194	Seguin	821	674	506	Jacmel	Sud-Est
195	Ferme Leblanc	780	681	521	Les Cayes	Sud
196	Saut de Baril	747	632		Anse-a-Veau	Nippes
197	La Soufrière	681	499	304	Acul du Nord	Nord
198	Fond des Blancs	572	507	386	Aquin	Sud
199	Marmont	570	459		Marmelade	Artibonite
200	Marbial	566	465	349	Jacmel	Sud-Est
201	Dupity	547	507	380	Trou du Nord	Nord-Est
202	Mapou	442	363	273	Belle Anse	Sud-Est
203	Lesson	406	335	296	Anse d'Hainault	Grand'Anse
204	Guichard	321	255	181	Saint-Louis-Du-Nord	Nord-Ouest
205	Sources Chaudes	233	199	192	Jeremie	Grand'Anse

== See also ==
- Departments of Haiti
- Arrondissements of Haiti
- List of communes of Haiti
- Communal section
- List of cities in the Caribbean
