= Marie Kingué =

Haitian healer and diviner

Marie Kingué, also known by the slave name Marie Catherine, was a Haitian healer and diviner. She was of Kongolese provenance and was born between 1746 and 1750. After being transported to Saint-Domingue as a slave, she adopted the name "Kingué" to display her ancestry. In 1784 and 1785, while working on a plantation in Port-Margot, Kingué gained prominence for nursing supposed evil spells, providing herbal remedies, and selling protective talismans. Many slaveowners trusted her to divinate poisoners in their workshops, and they often killed the slaves she accused.

In 1785, Kingué moved to Plaisance to live with a militia commander. With more freedom, she began traveling to clients all across the northern part of the island—Africans at first, then multiple white colonists and free people of color. Kingué attempted to silence her detractors. Still, she eventually lost support from white colonists, a few of whom sent complaints regarding her deadly activities to the attorney general of Cap-Français. He ordered her arrest that September, and her life afterwards is unknown.

== Early life and enslavement ==
According to court documents, Marie Kingué was of Kongolese provenance and was born between 1746 and 1750. The researcher Crystal Nicole Eddins suggests that her pseudonym "Kingué" traces her to Kinguélé, the capital city of the kingdom of Kakongo. Kingué had two or three Kongolese marks on her cheek, and her face bore scars. She was eventually transported to the French colony of Saint-Domingue, present-day Haiti, as part of the Atlantic slave trade. This likely occurred through the Malemba port, nearly 40 miles from Kinguélé, and through a process of judicial enslavement. Eddins posits that Kingué may have escaped once. A December 1774 issue of Le Cap profiled a wanted woman named "Keingue" who had fled with an African man named "Moisna". He was likewise a slave and had tattoos of a Maltese cross and his homeland.

For many years until 1785, Kingué worked as a slave in Port-Margot on the plantation of a white man, Caillon Belhumeur, and an unnamed woman, likely a free woman of color. Kingué cohabited with Polidor, a Kongolese man and lieutenant. Her European slave name was "Marie Catherine", though she used the African surname "Kingué" to renounce the practice and display her ancestry. As well, she insisted she was a free woman. Eddins and the historian Karol K. Weaver consider these acts a reclamation of identity from white authorities like Belhumeur.

== Healing and divination ==
In 1784 and 1785, Kingué practiced healing, herbalism, divination, and midwifery. In a time when the religion was outlawed, she may have also acted as a vaudoux queen. The terms kaperlata (Note: A feared and reckless health professional hired by lower-class white people and free black people, sometimes for spiritual illnesses.) and hospitalière were variously used to describe her. Court documents assert that Kingué could heal many illnesses, kill, and resuscitate. She specialized in nursing supposed evil spells and gave herbal remedies to lower-class white people, people of color, and slaves. Though it was also outlawed to manufacture them, Kingué gained prominence as far as Limbé and Plaisance for selling talismans. They cost 10 to 12 gourdes and reportedly carried spiritual powers against illnesses. She held gatherings where she performed witchcraft on the talismans, then distributed them, often while a male sorcerer sang and led dances.

By 1784, slaveowners trusted Kingué to divinate poisoners in their workshops. Belhumeur was one of her clients. Neighbours claimed he overworked a few of his slaves to death, though he did not accept this conclusion and asked Kingué to determine whether the workers were poisoned and, if so, the culprit. After performing a ritual, she surmised that his home held a conspiracy, and without holding a trial, he tortured and killed the slaves whom Kingué accused. Her service of discovering poisoners in workshops was so high in demand that she and Polidor, now her assistant, began initiating students. In another instance, Kingué invited Belhumeur to the hut of a sick pregnant woman she was assisting. The woman reportedly gave birth to a dead snake under her care, which left Belhumeur awestruck. This incident fueled Africans to revere Kingué as a god, or at least associate her with Mbumba, a divine Kongolese snake spirit. Some Africans committed theft to pay for her services.

In 1785, Belhumeur brought Kingué to Plaisance, a mountainous coffee parish south of Port-Margot, to visit the home of Antoine Chailleau, a militia commander who believed his slaves had poisoned him. Kingué affirmed this but thought his sickness was far from fatal. According to Nicolas François de Neufchâteau, the attorney general of Cap-Français, she then removed the poison by drawing a toad from his head and another from his side. He reportedly felt better and let her stay on the plantation to find the perpetrators. Chailleau burned and whipped to death or sold overseas the seven or eight slaves Kingué accused. She eventually moved into his home, likely with Belhumeur's consent, after claiming she had overlooked a few slaves.

Kingué began exercising the lifestyle of a free woman while paying a monthly fee to Belhumeur. Her following grew, as did the variety of people requesting her divinations or healings—Africans at first, then multiple white colonists and free people of color. The trance states she manifested, in which she adopted the voice of a man or a weak woman, were popular, and Chailleau took her to various plantations across the northern part of the island, often in Limbé. One complaint states, "she has acquired a renown that extends across the entire North Province" and continues, "she knows all the secrets of all the plantations." Kingué never had enough talismans in stock, which the complaint said all of Plaisance wore with pride. Another complaint worried about the fanaticism surrounding Kingué, such that "the greatest disorder would arise in the work gangs." In one case, she assembled one hundred men from a work gang and prompted them to revolt against their owner.

== Detractors and arrest ==
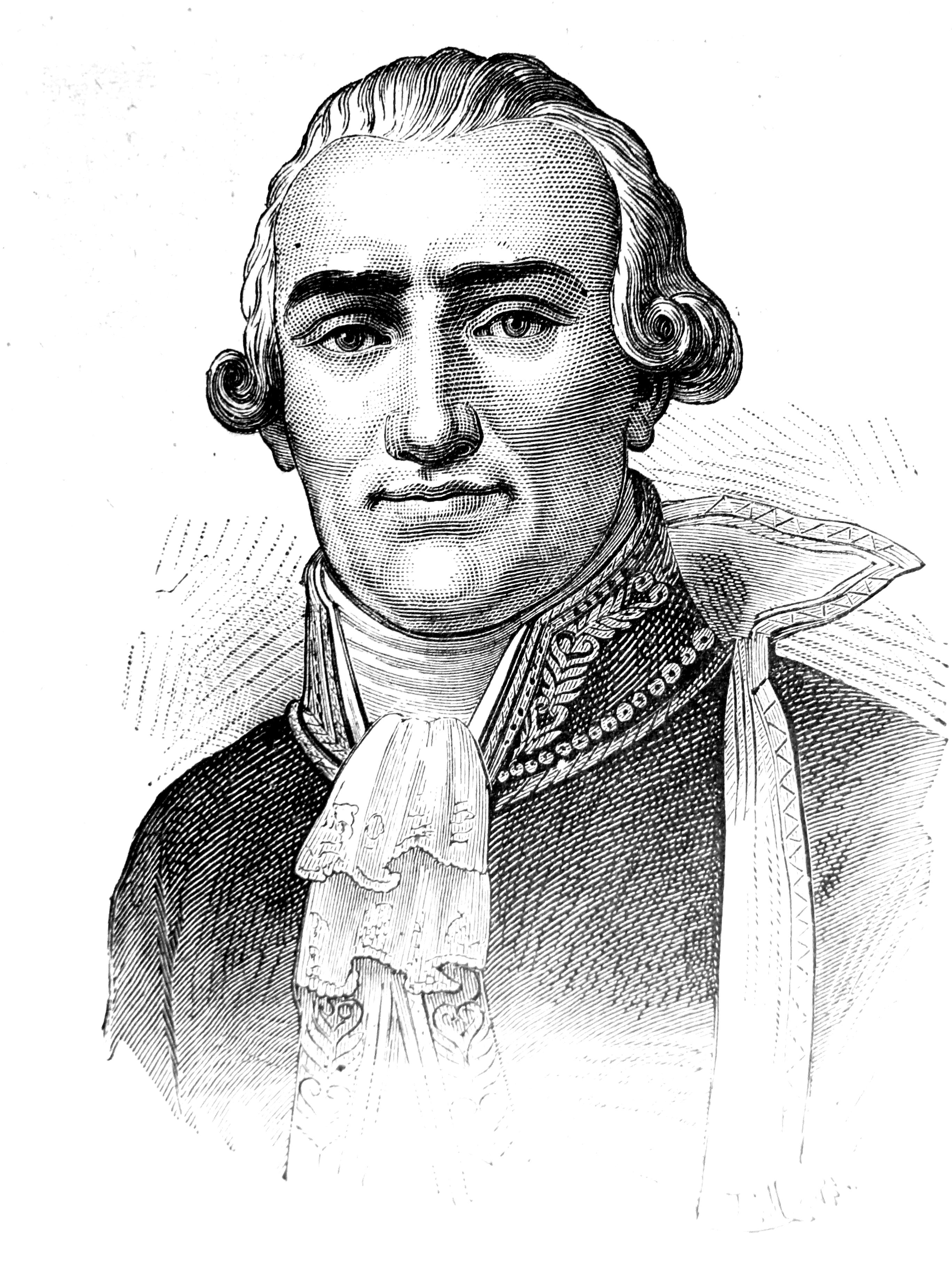
Kingué is documented in the papers of Neufchâteau deposited in the Archives Nationales.

Kingué occasionally silenced her detractors. While performing rituals on a plantation in Pilate, three of her former initiates planned to incriminate her, but she threatened them into silence. On Chailleau's plantation, in front of a group of white people, she threatened a prominent surgeon who had doubted that poisonings were the main cause of deaths. The manager of a plantation in Pilate, where Polidor worked, supported Kingué at first but eventually tried to detain her. She bit him and escaped, and out of fear, the slaves who were present did not impede.

Some white colonists became irritated by her political influence, audacity, and wealth. On September 3, 1785, a slaveowner with only the signature "M." denounced her in a letter to Neufchâteau. Two weeks later, a notary named LeMay did the same. The two branded Kingué a hussy and a charlatan, and her devotees "weak-minded imbeciles". They also feared their neighbours might ostracize them if their opinions were known. Certain plantation managers in Plaisance wrote to Neufchâteau about complaints they had expressed to Belhumeur. When a mutilated slave who had escaped him met with a Cap-Français judge, he was summoned to court for being complicit in Kingué's activities. Belhumeur promised to reprimand her, but the managers complained that instead, he continued to pay for her services. They believed the maréchaussée and certain white soldiers were too loyal to her and requested she be seized by a special brigade. Jean Baptiste Suarez d'Almeida, a royal prosecutor in Cap-Français, agreed with this sentiment in a report he wrote. He thought she had victimized both black and white people with absurd superstitions.

In late September, Neufchâteau wrote a final report ordering Kingué and Polidor's arrest, summarizing the case, and listing victims likely to testify. While she was wanted for arrest, Kingué hid in Chailleau's home. The transcript of her trial describes her with contempt. It introduces her as a "négresse, or rather [a] monster", and asserts that she is not a free woman but "in fact a slave and a vagabond". The outcome of the trial, whether she was brought to the courthouse, and her life afterwards are unknown.
