= Fond La Grange =

- Village
- Location in Haiti
- Coordinates: 19°49′0″N 72°15′0″W
- Country: Haiti
- Department: Nord
- Arrondissement: Limbé
- Time zone: UTC-5 (UTC)

Fond La Grange (French pronunciation: [fɔ̃ la ɡʁɑ̃ʒ]) is a village near Borgne, Haiti. A hospital is located there. The hospital is run by the Alyans Sante Borgne, a partnership between the non-governmental organization H.O.P.E. (Haiti Outreach Pwoje Espwa, based in Rochester New York) and the Haitian government's ministry of public health (MSPP).
