= Capotille =

Capotille Kapotiy
- Commune
- Location in Haiti
- Coordinates: 19°27′0″N 71°42′0″W
- Country: Haiti
- Department: Nord-Est
- Arrondissement: Ouanaminthe
- Elevation: 112 m (367 ft)

Population (7 August 2003)
  - Total: 15,086
- Time zone: UTC-05:00 (EST)
  - Summer (DST): UTC-04:00 (EDT)

Capotille (French pronunciation: [kapɔtij]; Haitian Creole: Kapotiy) is a commune in the Ouanaminthe Arrondissement, in the Nord-Est department of Haiti. It has 15,086 inhabitants and is adjacent to the Dominican Republic–Haiti border.

== Communal Sections ==
The commune consists of two communal sections, namely:

- Capotille, urban and rural, contains the town of Capotille
- Lamine, rural
