= Borgne =

Borgne Obòy
- Commune
- Location in Haiti
- Coordinates: 19°51′0″N 72°32′0″W
- Country: Haiti
- Department: Nord
- Arrondissement: Borgne
- Elevation: 12 m (39 ft)

Population (7 August 2003)
  - Total: 46,886
- Time zone: UTC-05:00 (EST)
  - Summer (DST): UTC-04:00 (EDT)

Borgne (French pronunciation: [bɔʁɲ]; Haitian Creole: Obòy) is a commune in the Borgne Arrondissement, in Nord department of Haiti. The economy there is based on agriculture and fishery. Other nearby places include Port-Margot, Robin, and Fond La Grange. Since 2011, Borgne has been a "sister city" with Honeoye Falls, New York, United States.

== Communal Sections ==
The commune consists of seven communal sections, namely:

- Margot, rural
- Boucan Michel, rural
- Petit Bourg de Borgne, urban (Petit Bourg de Borgne neighborhood) and rural
- Trou d'Enfer, rural
- Champagne, rural
- Molas, rural
- Côte de Fer et Fond Lagrange, urban (town of Borgne) and rural
