= Labadee =

Private resort in Nord, Haiti

Labadie Labadee
- Village
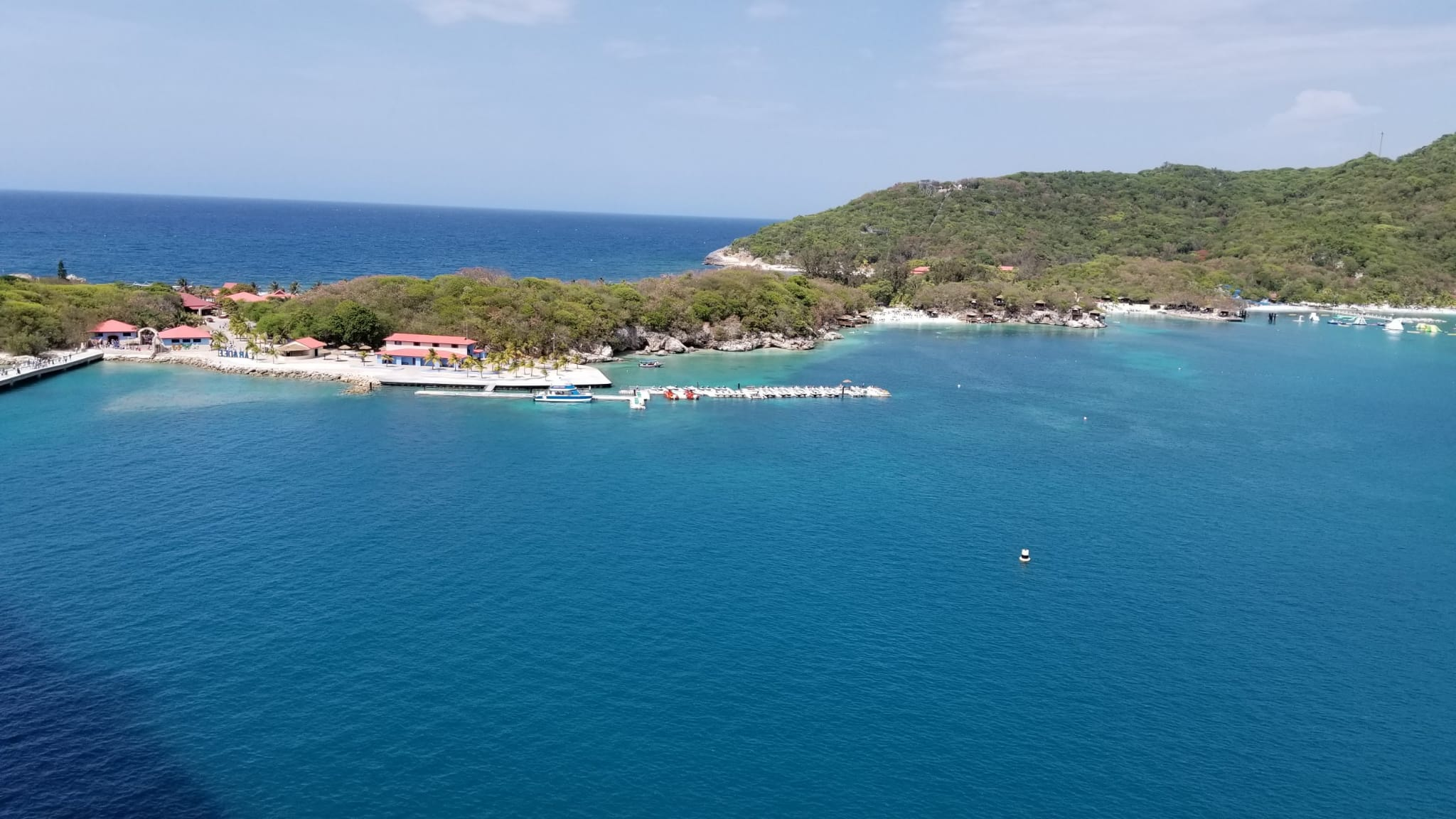

- The nation of Haiti, showing Labadie
- Coordinates: 19°47′11″N 72°14′44″W
- Country: Haiti
- Department: Nord
- Arrondissement: Cap-Haïtien
- Time zone: UTC-05:00 (EST)
  - Summer (DST): UTC-04:00 (EDT)

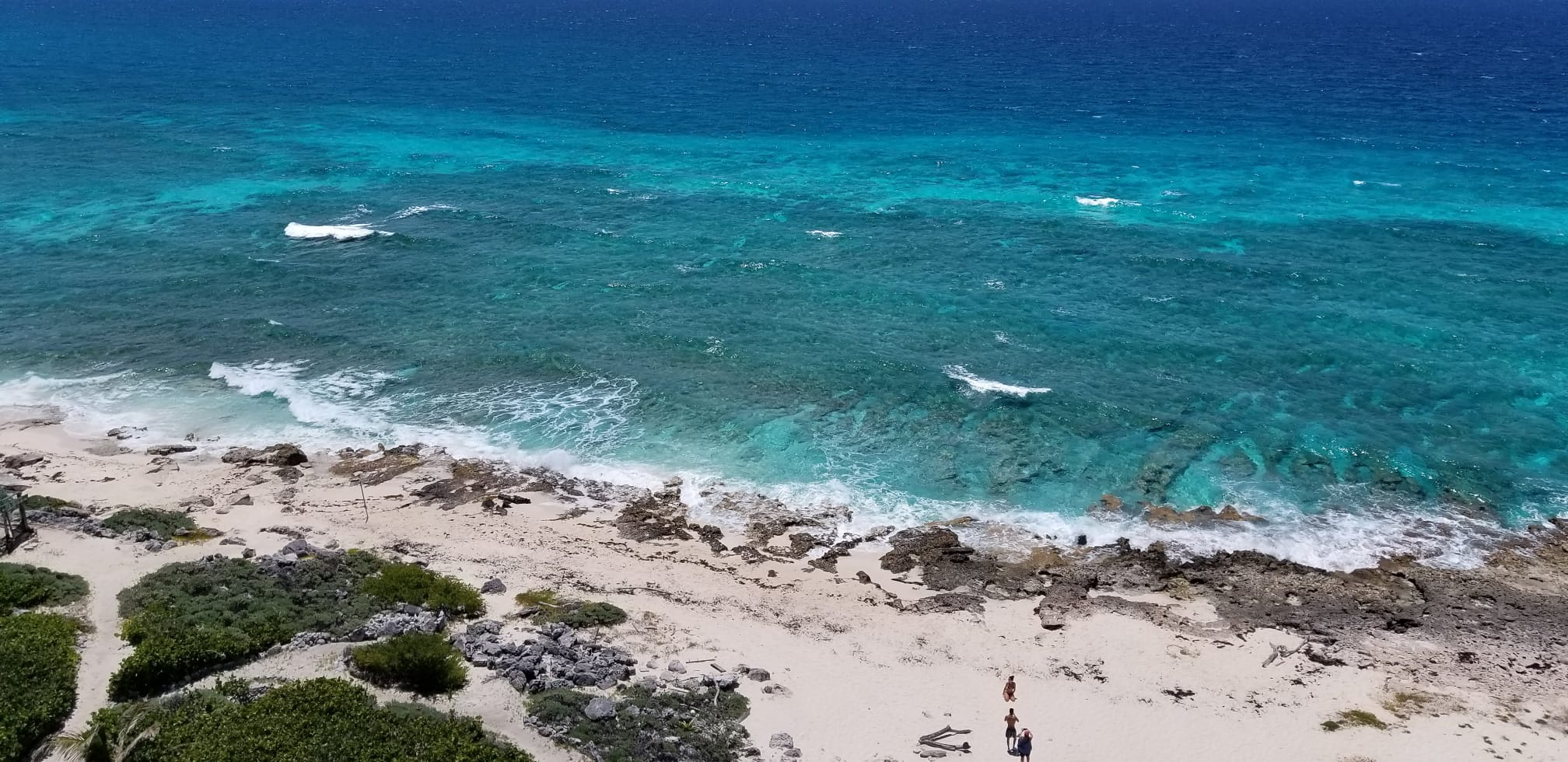
Beach in Labadee, Haiti

Labadee (French: Labadie) is a private resort located on the northern coast of Haiti within the arrondissement of Cap-Haïtien in the Nord department. In 1985 the government of Haiti under the leadership of the dictator Jean-Claude "Baby Doc" Duvalier leased the area to Royal Caribbean Group, for the exclusive use of passengers of its three cruise lines: Royal Caribbean International, Celebrity Cruises, and Azamara Club Cruises. The lease was later extended to 2050. The resort is completely tourist-oriented and is guarded by a private security force. The site is doubly fenced off from the surrounding area; passengers cannot leave the property and locals cannot enter. Food available to tourists is brought from the cruise ships. A controlled group of Haitian merchants are given sole rights to sell merchandise and establish their businesses in the resort. Although sometimes described as an island in advertisements, it is actually a peninsula contiguous with the island of Hispaniola. The cruise ship moors to the pier at Labadee are capable of servicing the Oasis class ships, which was completed in late 2009. The commercial airport that is closest to Labadee is Cap-Haïtien International Airport.

Attractions include a Haitian flea market, beaches, watersports, a water-oriented playground, an alpine coaster, and the largest zip-line over water.

== Etymology ==
The location is named after Marquis de La Badie, a Frenchman who first settled the area in the 17th century. The peninsula and a village were named Labadie. The cruise company spells the name "Labadee" to make it easier for American English-speakers to pronounce.

== History ==
In the 18th century, the bay was known as Port François, with the peninsula (Point Labadie) known as Point de Port François. It was not to be confused with Cap Français, then the name of today's Cap-Haitien, on the other side of the Labadie Forest.

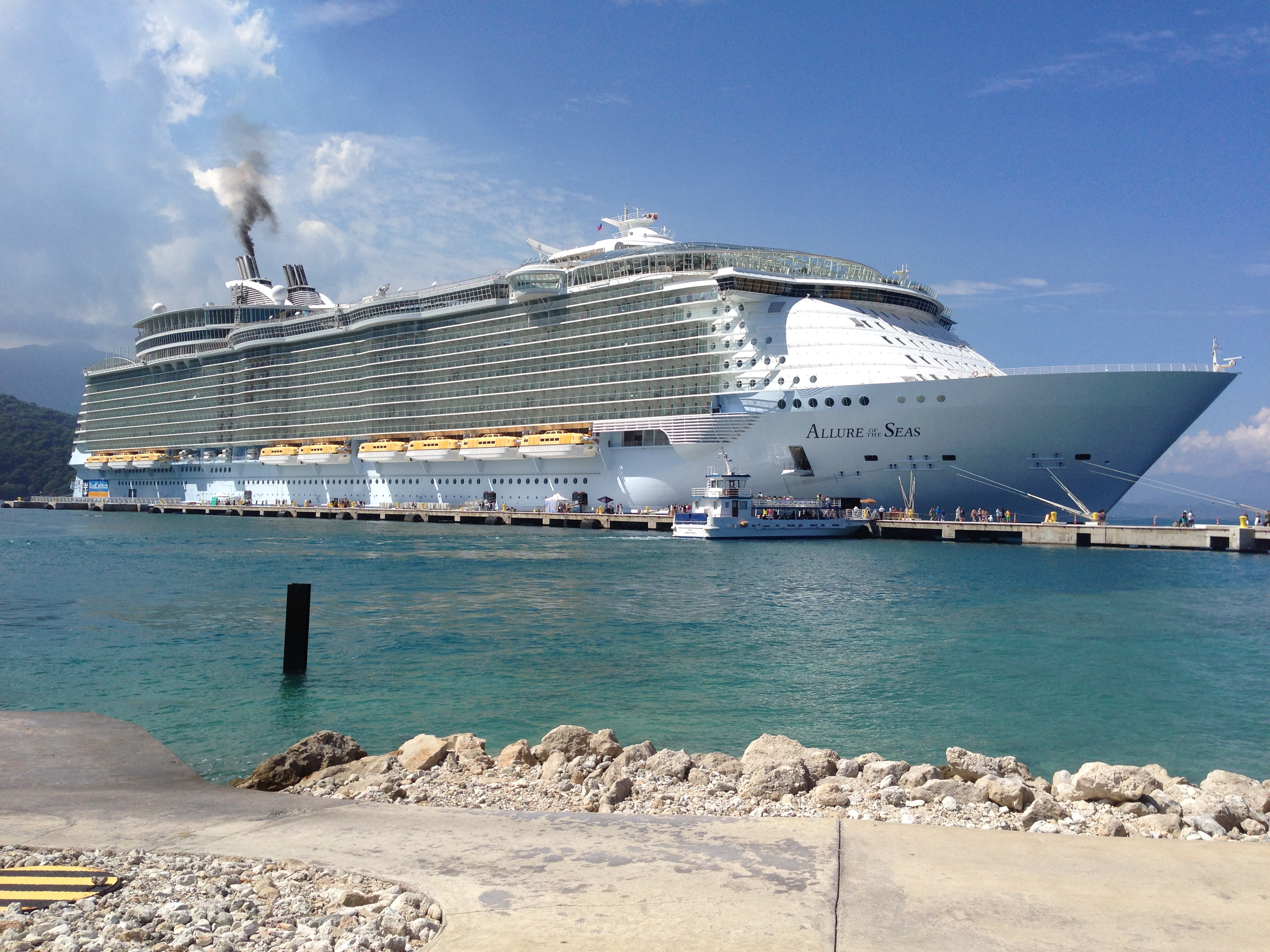
The Allure of the Seas docked in Labadee

Labadee is a 260-acre private resort that was leased to Royal Caribbean Cruises in 1986. In the 1990s, it was variously reported that many cruise ship guests who disembarked at the location were unaware that they were in Haiti - at least in part because the cruise company seemed to have a policy of referring only to Hispaniola, not that they were in Haiti. The area's separation from the rest of Haiti has also been criticized as presenting an "island fantasy" excluding Haitians and their culture with little benefit in return, despite the visitor fee that the Haitian government receives.

In November 2001, a crew member from the cruise line Royal Caribbean was attacked on Labadee in an apparent robbery. The assailants were arrested by Haitian police.

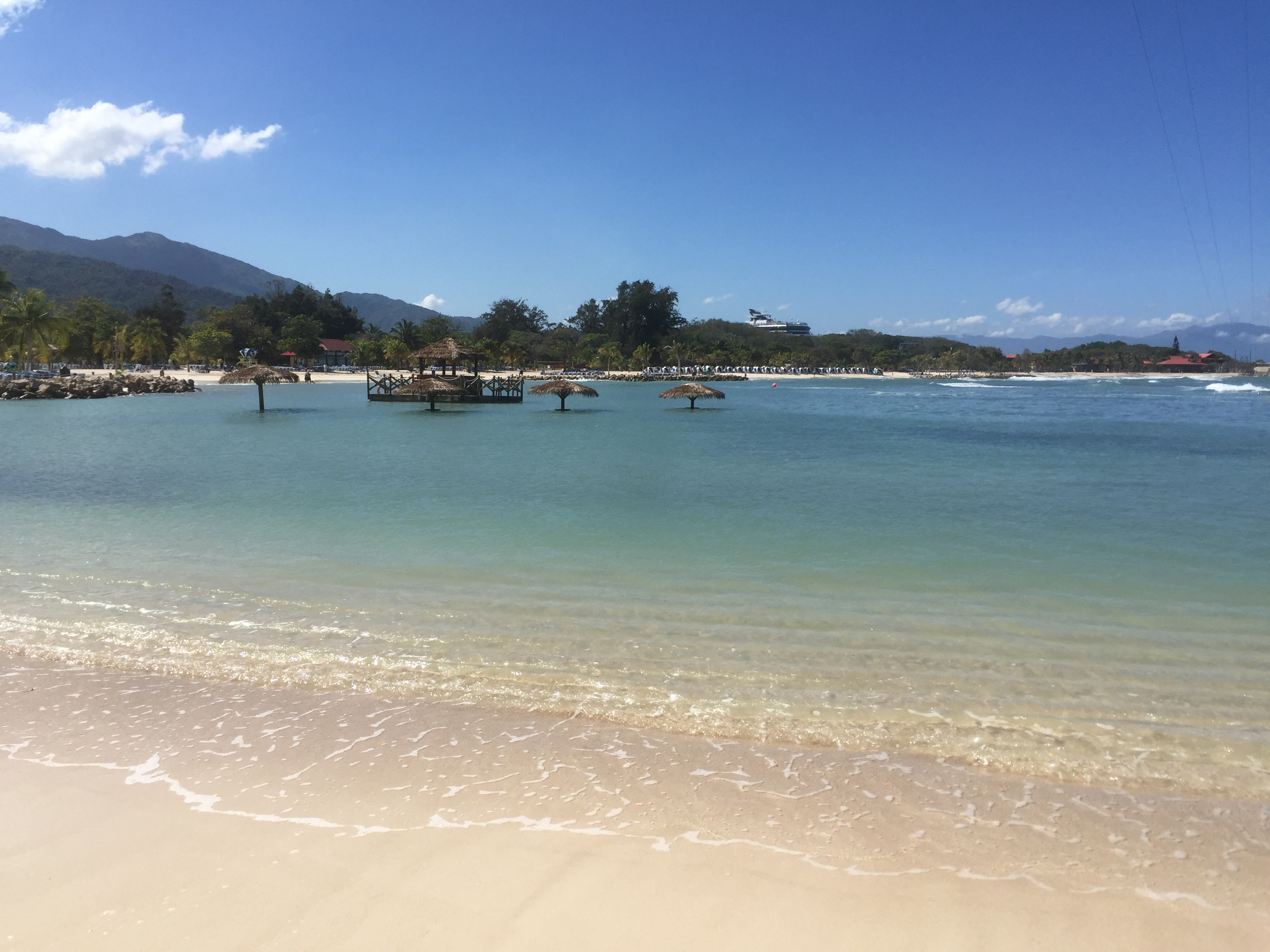
Beach in Labadee (Jan 2019)

In February 2004, during the 2004 Haitian coup d'état, Royal Caribbean temporarily suspended use of the stop due to the political unrest in the country.

In 2009, Royal Caribbean made US$55 million in improvements to the facilities, including upgrading port facilities to allow the docking of their largest cruise ships.

In January 2010, just after the 2010 Haiti earthquake, Royal Caribbean announced its intention to continue cruise stopovers at the port and use cruise ships to ferry relief supplies and personnel. In addition, it would donate US$1 million to fund relief efforts in Haiti.

In January 2016, Haitians in boats protesting against the Haitian government blocked the port. Royal Caribbean's Freedom of the Seas cancelled their port stop on January 19 as a result.

On March 14, 2024, Royal Caribbean suspended cruise calls to Labadee due to widespread gang violence and political upheaval in Haiti. The company resumed port calls in October.

In September 2025, Royal Caribbean suspended cruise calls to Labadee indefinitely due to widespread violence and travel advisories in Haiti.
