= Ferrier, Haiti =

Ferrier Ferye
- Commune
- Location in Haiti
- Coordinates: 19°37′0″N 71°47′0″W
- Country: Haiti
- Department: Nord-Est
- Arrondissement: Fort-Liberté

Area
  - Commune: 70 km^{2} (27 sq mi)
  - Urban: 1.08 km^{2} (0.42 sq mi)
  - Rural: 68.92 km^{2} (26.61 sq mi)
- Elevation: 8 m (26 ft)

Population (2015)
  - Commune: 14,642
  - Density: 210/km^{2} (540/sq mi)
  - Urban: 8,972
  - Rural: 5,670
- Time zone: UTC-05:00 (EST)
  - Summer (DST): UTC-04:00 (EDT)
- Towns: 1
- Communal Sections: 1

Ferrier (French pronunciation: [fɛʁje]; Haitian Creole: Ferye) is a commune in the Fort-Liberté Arrondissement, in the Nord-Est department of Haiti. It had 14,642 inhabitants as of 2015.

== Communal Sections ==
The commune consists of one communal section, namely:

- Bas Maribahoux, urban and rural, containing the town of Ferrier
