= Perches, Haiti =

Perches Pèch
- Commune
- Location in Haiti
- Coordinates: 19°31′0″N 71°55′0″W
- Country: Haiti
- Department: Nord-Est
- Arrondissement: Fort-Liberté

Area
  - Commune: 39.64 km^{2} (15.31 sq mi)
  - Urban: 1.89 km^{2} (0.73 sq mi)
  - Rural: 37.75 km^{2} (14.58 sq mi)
- Elevation: 99 m (325 ft)

Population (2015)
  - Commune: 11,556
  - Density: 291.5/km^{2} (755.0/sq mi)
  - Urban: 6,729
  - Rural: 4,827
- Time zone: UTC-05:00 (EST)
  - Summer (DST): UTC-04:00 (EDT)
- Towns: 1
- Communal Sections: 2

Perches (French pronunciation: [pɛʁʃ]; Haitian Creole: Pèch) is a commune in the Fort-Liberté Arrondissement, in the Nord-Est department of Haiti. It had 11,556 inhabitants as of 2015.

== Communal Sections ==
The commune consists of two communal sections, namely:

- Haut des Perches, rural
- Bas des Perches, urban and rural, containing the town of Perches
