= La Borde, Haiti =

La Borde
- Village
- Location in Haiti
- Coordinates: 18.2797454°N 73.7999941°W
- Country: Haiti
- Department: Sud
- Arrondissement: Les Cayes
- Elevation: 88 m (289 ft)

La Borde is a village in the Les Cayes commune of the Les Cayes Arrondissement, in the Sud department of Haiti.

It is named after Jean-Joseph de Laborde, a French financier and slaveholder.
