= Quartier-Morin =

Quartier-Morin Katye Moren
- Commune
- Location in Haiti
- Coordinates: 19°42′0″N 72°9′0″W
- Country: Haiti
- Department: Nord
- Arrondissement: Cap-Haïtien
- Elevation: 8 m (26 ft)

Population (7 August 2003)
  - Total: 19,241
- Time zone: UTC-05:00 (EST)
  - Summer (DST): UTC-04:00 (EDT)

Quartier-Morin (French pronunciation: [kaʁtje mɔʁɛ̃]; Haitian Creole: Katye Moren) is a commune in the Cap-Haïtien Arrondissement, in the Nord department of Haiti. It has 19,241 inhabitants. General Eugene Francois Magloire was born here in 1840 and his son The former president Paul Eugene Magloire was born here in 1907. Emerante de Pradine wrote a song to talk about how well the woman of Quartier Morin dance voodoo. The song name was Neges Katye Morin.

== Economic ==
The local economy is based on the cultivation of cocoa, tobacco, sugar cane with distilleries and the distillation of essential oil.
