= La Victoire, Haiti =

La Victoire Laviktwa
- Commune
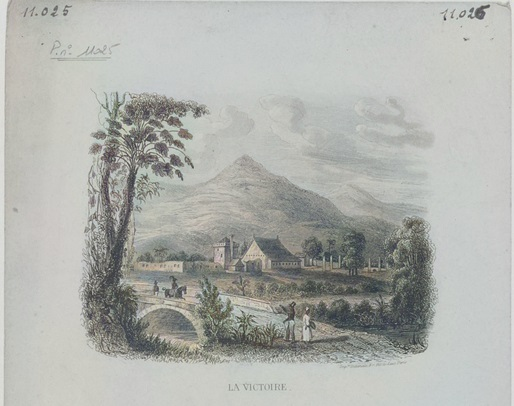
- La Victoire in 1847

- Location in Haiti
- Coordinates: 19°20′0″N 72°2′0″W
- Country: Haiti
- Department: Nord
- Arrondissement: Saint-Raphaël
- Elevation: 432 m (1,417 ft)

Population (7 August 2003)
  - Total: 6,421
- Time zone: UTC-05:00 (EST)
  - Summer (DST): UTC-04:00 (EDT)

La Victoire (French pronunciation: [la viktwaʁ]; Haitian Creole: Laviktwa) is a commune in the Saint-Raphaël Arrondissement, in the Nord department of Haiti. It has 6,421 inhabitants.
