= Trou-du-Nord =

Trou-du-Nord Twou dinò
- Commune
- Location in Haiti
- Coordinates: 19°38′0″N 72°1′0″W
- Country: Haiti
- Department: Nord-Est
- Arrondissement: Trou-du-Nord
- Elevation: 36 m (118 ft)

Population (7 August 2003)
  - Total: 37,405
- Time zone: UTC-05:00 (EST)
  - Summer (DST): UTC-04:00 (EDT)

Trou-du-Nord (French pronunciation: [tʁu dy nɔʁ]; Haitian Creole: Twou dinò) is a commune in the Trou-du-Nord Arrondissement, in the Nord-Est department of Haiti. It has a population of 37,405.

== Communal Sections ==
The commune consists of three communal sections, namely:

- Garcin, rural
- Roucou, urban and rural, containing the city of Trou-du-Nord
- Roche Plate, rural

== Notable residents ==
- Jovenel Moïse, (1968-2021), politician, President of Haiti, 2017-2021
