= List of departments of Haiti by Human Development Index =

This is a list of departments of Haiti by Human Development Index as of 2023.

Rank	Region	HDI (2023)
Medium human development
1	Ouest (include Port-au-Prince metropolitan area)	0.637
2	Nord	0.613
3	Nord-Ouest	0.587
4	Nord-Est	0.582
5	Sud	0.578
6	Sud-Est	0.569
7	Grand'Anse, Nippes	0.560
8	Artibonite	0.557
-	Haiti (average)	0.598
Low human development
9	Centre	0.538

== See also ==
- List of countries by Human Development Index
