= Caracol, Haiti =

Caracol Karakòl
- Commune
- Location in Haiti
- Coordinates: 19°41′34″N 72°1′05″W
- Country: Haiti
- Department: Nord-Est
- Arrondissement: Trou-du-Nord
- Elevation: 3 m (9.8 ft)

Population (7 August 2003)
  - Total: 6,236
- Time zone: UTC-05:00 (EST)
  - Summer (DST): UTC-04:00 (EDT)

Caracol (French pronunciation: [kaʁakɔl]; Haitian Creole: Karakòl) is a commune in the Trou-du-Nord Arrondissement, in the Nord-Est department of Haiti. It has 6,236 inhabitants.

== Caracol Industrial Park ==
=== Background ===
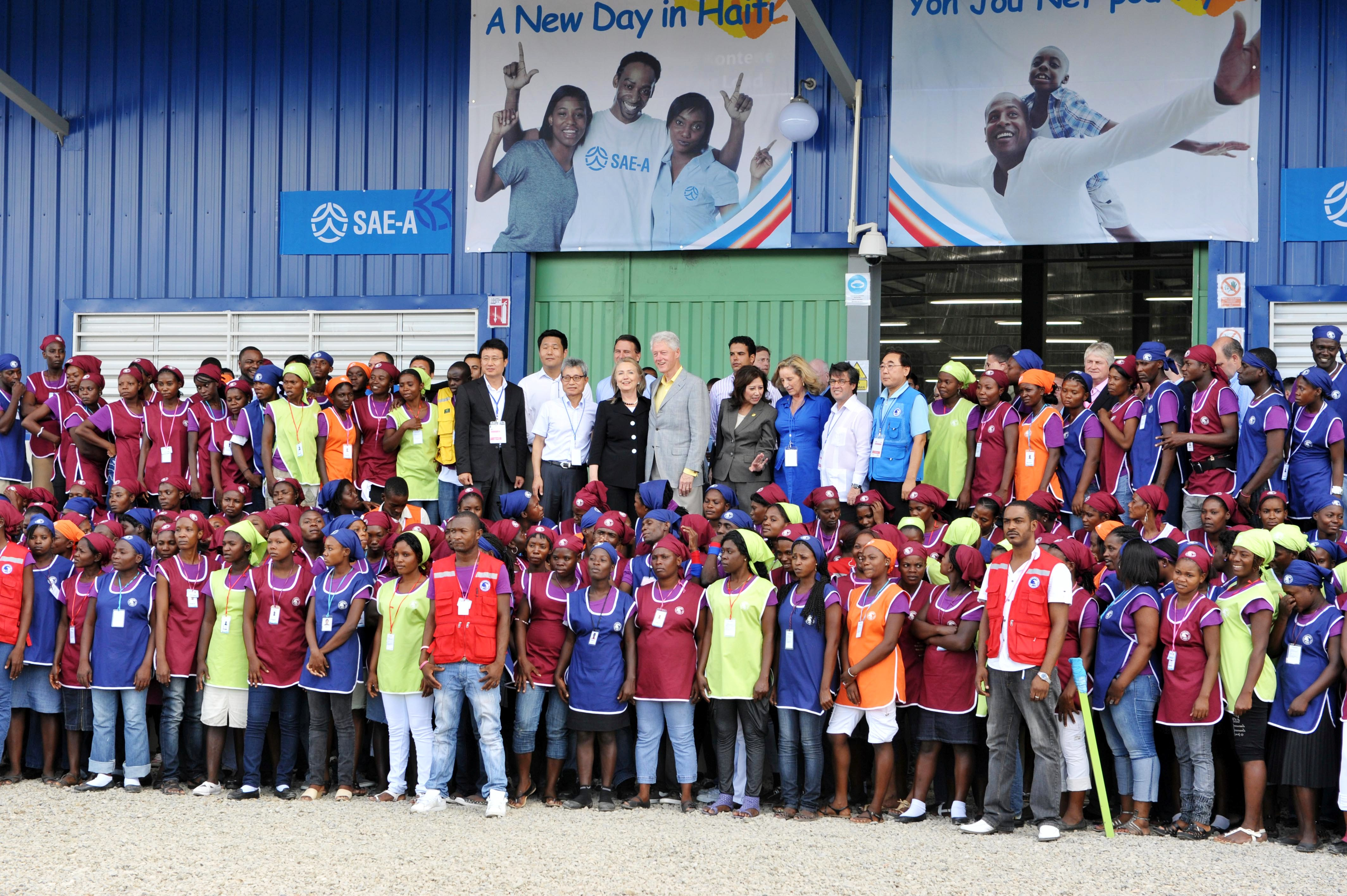
President Clinton and Secretary Clinton pose for a photo with workers at Caracol Industrial Park.

Prior to the 2010 earthquake, Bill Clinton was named special envoy to Haiti by UN Secretary-General Ban Ki-moon, whose connections with the South Korean company Sae-A Trading Co. Ltd were later put to work in the planning of the park. On May 24, 2010, the Haiti Economic Lift Program (HELP) was signed into US law, ensuring preferential tariffs for Haitian-produced garments. On October 22, 2012 Hillary Clinton gave the keynote speech as acting US Secretary of State for the opening of the industrial park.

==== Projections ====
The anchor tenant is S & H Global, S.A, a subsidiary of Sae-A Trading Co. Ltd., a global clothing manufacturer headquartered in South Korea. It began operations in the fall of 2012; a work force of 20,000 was projected for that year. The eventual workforce was projected to approach 60,000 by 2017 and ultimately 100,000 workers. This would result in an estimated tenfold expansion of population in the area to about 300,000 from its present 30,000. Social and environmental disruption was anticipated as the result of this hastily planned project.

==== Construction ====
In 2012 the Caracol Industrial Park was built on a square mile, 600 acre, 252 hectare site near Caracol over a former labor camp used by United States Marines during the United States occupation of Haiti. The facility has some of the best constructed infrastructure in Haiti. The $300 million project, which was to include a 10-megawatt power plant, road, a water-treatment plant, worker housing in neighboring communities, and development of a port in nearby Fort-Liberté, was built with hurricane relief funds, a loan from the Inter-American Development Bank, contributions by the United States government, and the Clinton Foundation. As of 2013, 1.7 of the projected 10 megawatts were being supplied by the power plant.

=== Results ===
Since its opening, factory conditions have become a source of significant criticism, particularly concerning living wages and housing. Although the minimum wage was raised over US Embassy, US AID, and US State Department opposition, garment factories across the country, including at Caracol Industrial Park, were not applying the law in late 2013.

The numbers of those employed was much smaller than estimated, with only 5,479 full-time employees in 2017, with investments for the park costing about $55,000 USD per job, thirty times 2,900% more than annual salary of each worker. In April 2019, 13,000 people were employed at the Caracol industrial Park. At this time, S&H Global decided not to expand their production capacity in Haiti as they had planned. According to Haïti Libre, beyond management and security problems, this was most likely due to a lower house vote approving a 78.5% increase in the Haitian minimum wage for workers in the sector. At the same time, the Interamerican Development Bank decided to withdraw a $31 million pledge made in 2015 for expansion of the site.

== Communal Sections ==
The commune consists of two communal sections, namely:

- Champin, urban and rural, containing the town of Caracol
- Glaudine or "Jacquesil", rural
