= Sainte-Suzanne, Haiti =

Sainte-Suzanne Sent Sizàn
- Commune
- Location in Haiti
- Coordinates: 19°35′0″N 72°5′0″W
- Country: Haiti
- Department: Nord-Est
- Arrondissement: Trou-du-Nord

Population (7 August 2003)
  - Total: 21,617
- Time zone: UTC-05:00 (EST)
  - Summer (DST): UTC-04:00 (EDT)

Sainte-Suzanne (French pronunciation: [sɛ̃t syzan]; Haitian Creole: Sent Sizàn) is a commune in the Trou-du-Nord Arrondissement, in the Nord-Est department of Haiti. It has 21,617 inhabitants.

== Communal Sections ==
The commune consists of six communal sections, namely:

- Foulon, rural
- Bois Blanc, urban and rural, containing part of the town of Sainte Suzanne
- Cotelette, rural
- Sarazin, urban and rural, containing part of the town of Sainte Suzanne
- Moka Neuf, rural
- Fond Bleu, urban and rural, containing the Quartier de Dupity
