= Acul-du-Nord =

Acul-du-Nord: Akil dinò
- Commune
- Location in Haiti
- Coordinates: 19°41′0″N 72°19′0″W
- Country: Haiti
- Department: Nord
- Arrondissement: Acul-du-Nord

Area
  - Total: 186.37 km^{2} (71.96 sq mi)
- Elevation: 20 m (66 ft)

Population (March, 2015)
  - Total: 55,908
  - Density: 300/km^{2} (780/sq mi)
- Time zone: UTC-05:00 (EST)
  - Summer (DST): UTC-04:00 (EDT)
- Communal sections: 6

Acul-du-Nord (French pronunciation: [akyl dy nɔʁ]; Haitian Creole: Akil dinò) is a commune in the Acul-du-Nord Arrondissement, in the Nord department of Haiti.

== History ==
In 2010, Acul-du-Nord mayor Patrick Julien announced that elections would be cancelled due to violence, telling Agence France-Presse that "Men armed with machetes ransacked six polling stations".

Following the 2010 Haiti earthquake, the United Nations Stabilisation Mission in Haiti (MINUSTAH) funded the construction of a new Court of Peace building in the commune.

== Communal sections ==
The commune consists of six communal sections, namely:

- Camp-Louise, urban (Camp Louise neighborhood) and rural
- Bas de l'Acul, urban (town of Acul du Nord) and rural
- Mornet, rural
- Grande Ravine, rural
- Coupe à David, rural
- La Soufrière, urban (Soufrière neighborhood) and rural
