= Terrier-Rouge =

Terrier-Rouge Tèrye Wouj
- Commune
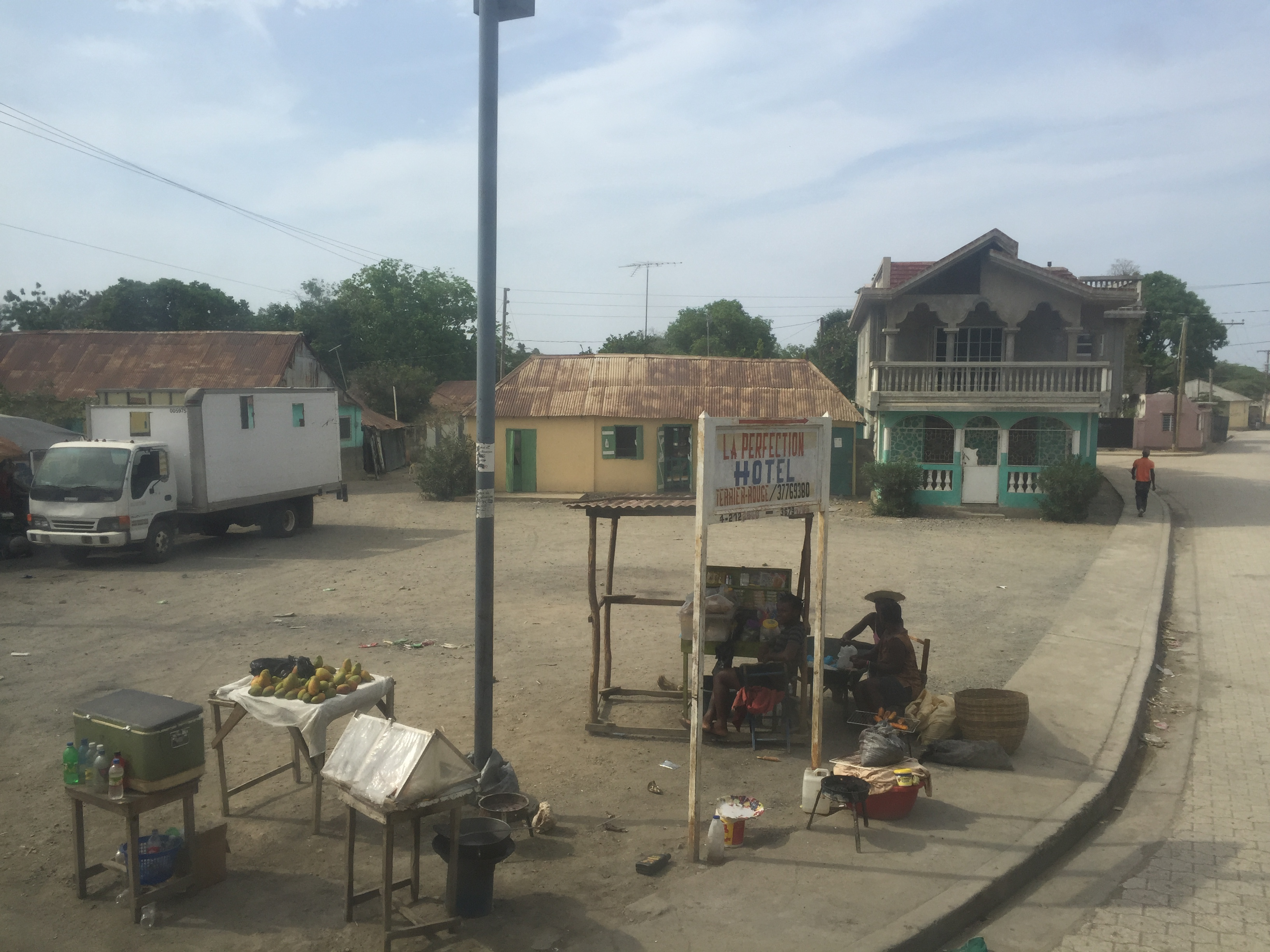
- Photo of La Perfection Hotel in Terrier-Rouge

- Location in Haiti
- Coordinates: 19°38′0″N 71°57′0″W
- Country: Haiti
- Department: Nord-Est
- Arrondissement: Trou-du-Nord
- Elevation: 36 m (118 ft)

Population (7 August 2003)
  - Total: 21,328
- Time zone: UTC-05:00 (EST)
  - Summer (DST): UTC-04:00 (EDT)

Terrier-Rouge (French pronunciation: [tɛʁje ʁuʒ]; Haitian Creole: Tèrye Wouj) is a commune in the Trou-du-Nord Arrondissement, in the Nord-Est department of Haiti. It has 21,328 inhabitants.

== Communal Sections ==
The commune consists of two communal sections, namely:

- Fond Blanc, urban and rural, containing the town of Terrier Rouge
- Grand Bassin, urban and rural, containing the town of Grand Bassin
