= Bas-Limbé =

Bas-Limbé Ba Lenbe
- Commune
- Location in Haiti
- Coordinates: 19°48′0″N 72°23′0″W
- Country: Haiti
- Department: Nord
- Arrondissement: Limbé
- Elevation: 0 m (0 ft)

Population (7 August 2003)
  - Total: 50 456
- Time zone: UTC-05:00 (EST)
  - Summer (DST): UTC-04:00 (EDT)

Bas-Limbé (French pronunciation: [ba lɛ̃be], lit. 'Lower Limbé'; Haitian Creole: Ba Lenbe) is a commune in the Limbé Arrondissement, in the Nord department of Haiti. It has 50 ,456 inhabitants.
