= Bertrand d'Ogeron =

French governor (1613–1676)

Bertrand d'Ogeron de La Bouëre (19 March 1613 - 31 January 1676) was an officer and Colonial Administrator of France in the 17th century. He was appointed Viceroy of France to Tortuga by King Louis XIV between June 1665 and 1668, then from 1669 to 1675.

== Biography ==
Bertrand d'Ogeron was born on the 19 March 1613 at Rochefort-sur-Loire. In 1641 he was promoted to the rank of Captain of the Marine Regiment, and fought during the War in Catalonia between 1646 and 1649. With the death of his father in 1653, Bertrand d'Ogeron succeeded him as Lord of La Bouëre, and lived in Angers until 1655.

He arrived in Martinique in the September of 1657. He lived as a buccaneer in the north-west of Saint-Domingue, at Petit-Goâve. He was at one point also a planter of tobacco at Léogâne and Port-Margot. In 1665 he was appointed Viceroy to Tortuga.

He contributed significantly to the population and settlement of Saint-Domingue. He encouraged the planting of tobacco, which turned a population of buccaneers and freebooters, who had not acquiesced to royal authority until 1660, into a sedentary population. D'Ogeron also attracted many colonists from Martinique and Guadeloupe, who were driven out by the land pressure which was generated by the extension of the sugar plantations in those colonies, and also from Nantes and La Rochelle.

He also organized privateering commissions for pirates to attack the Spanish. When he launched the colonization of Cap-Français in 1670, he triggered a revolt of the buccaneers against him. The crisis of tobacco intervened and a great number of places were abandoned. Jacques Neveu de Pouancey replaced him at the beginning of 1675, shortly after the creation of a large tobacco farm, which set a very low purchase price for tobacco to the planters and caused the ruin of the buccaneers. The new governor fortified and tried, initially unsuccessfully, to encourage the cultivation of sugar. Bertrand d'Ogeron returned to France after his replacement.

He died at Rue des Maçons-Sorbonne, Paris on the 31st of January, 1676. A marble plaque, affixed to a pillar of the Saint-Séverin church (5th arrondissement of Paris) in which he rests, writes: "From 1664 to 1675, he laid the foundations of a civil and religious society among the pirates and buccaneers of the Tortuga and Saint-Dominique islands and thus prepared, by the mysterious ways of Providence, the destiny of the Republic of Haiti."
