= Carice =

Carice Karis
- Commune
- Location in Haiti
- Coordinates: 19°23′0″N 71°50′0″W
- Country: Haiti
- Department: Nord-Est
- Arrondissement: Vallières

Area
  - Total: 115.0 km^{2} (44.4 sq mi)
- Elevation: 646 m (2,119 ft)

Population (7 August 2003)
  - Total: 10,180
  - Density: 88.5/km^{2} (229/sq mi)
- Time zone: UTC-05:00 (EST)
  - Summer (DST): UTC-04:00 (EDT)

Carice (French pronunciation: [kaʁis]; Haitian Creole: Karis) is a commune in the Vallières Arrondissement, in the Nord-Est department of Haiti. It has 10,180 inhabitants.

== Communal sections ==
The commune consists of two communal sections, namely:

- Bois Camelle, rural
- Rose Bonite, urban and rural, containing the town of Carice
