= Marfranc =

Marfranc Mafran
- Commune
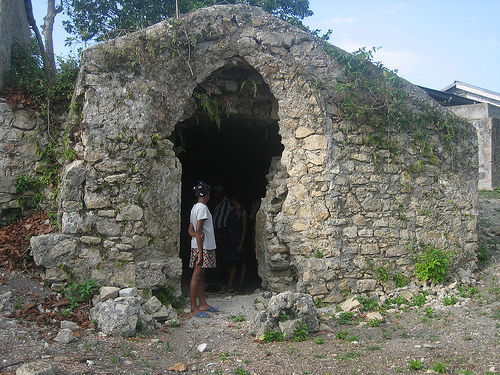
- Historical site, Fort Marfranc

- Location in Haiti
- Coordinates: 18°35′07″N 74°12′43″W
- Country: Haiti
- Department: Grand'Anse
- Arrondissement: Jérémie
- Elevation: 58 m (190 ft)
- Time zone: UTC−05:00 (EST)
  - Summer (DST): UTC−04:00 (EDT)
- Postal code: HT 7112

Marfranc (French pronunciation: [maʁfʁɑ̃]; Haitian Creole: Mafran) is a commune in the Jérémie Arrondissement, in the Grand'Anse department of Haiti. The town was made a commune by presidential decree on 22 July 2015.
