= Bahon, Haiti =

Bahon Bawon
- Commune
- Location in Haiti
- Coordinates: 19°28′10″N 72°06′53″W
- Country: Haiti
- Department: Nord
- Arrondissement: Grande-Rivière-du-Nord
- Founded: 1910
- Commune status: 1932
- Elevation: 171 m (561 ft)

Population (7 August 2003)
  - Total: 17,447
- Time zone: UTC-05:00 (EST)
  - Summer (DST): UTC-04:00 (EDT)

Bahon (French pronunciation: [baɔ̃]; Haitian Creole: Bawon), sometimes called Bohon, is a commune in Grande-Rivière-du-Nord Arrondissement in the Nord, department of Haiti. It is located on the Grand Rivière du Nord (river). It was formerly (until 1915) located on the railroad south from Cap-Haïtien.

== History ==
Bahon was founded in 1910 and was originally known as “Raque-à-Zinga”. It achieved commune status in 1932.

== Services ==
Since 2021, the commune has a Health Center with emergency services open 24/7.
