= Mont-Organisé =

Mont-Organisé Montòganize
- Commune
- Location in Haiti
- Coordinates: 19°24′0″N 71°47′0″W
- Country: Haiti
- Department: Nord-Est
- Arrondissement: Ouanaminthe
- Elevation: 650 m (2,130 ft)

Population (7 August 2003)
  - Total: 17,189
  - Density: 102/km^{2} (260/sq mi)
- Time zone: UTC-05:00 (EST)
  - Summer (DST): UTC-04:00 (EDT)

Mont-Organisé (French pronunciation: [mɔ̃t‿ɔʁɡanize]; Haitian Creole: Montòganize) is a commune in the Ouanaminthe Arrondissement, in the Nord-Est department of Haiti. It has 17,189 inhabitants.

== Communal Sections ==
The commune consists of two communal sections, namely:

- Savanette, urban and rural, containing the town of Mont-Organisé
- Bois Poux, rural
