= Plaisance, Nord =

Plaisance Plezans
- Commune
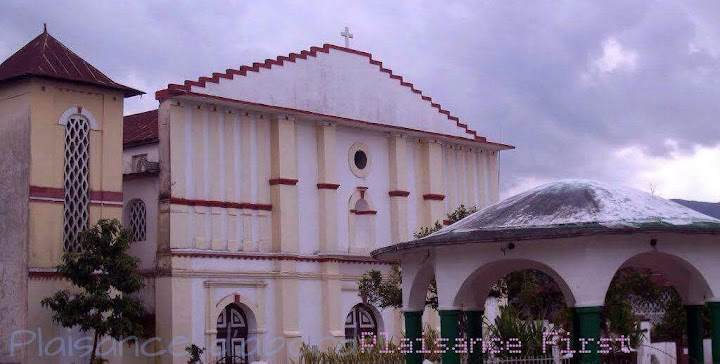
- The Archangel Michael is the patron saint of the town of Plaisance. This is the local Catholic Church, dedicated to Saint Michael the Archangel, the symbol of the town

- Location in Haiti
- Coordinates: 19°36′0″N 72°28′0″W
- Country: Haiti
- Department: Nord
- Arrondissement: Plaisance
- Elevation: 468 m (1,535 ft)

Population (7 August 2003)
  - Total: 50,367
- Time zone: UTC-05:00 (EST)
  - Summer (DST): UTC-04:00 (EDT)

Plaisance (French pronunciation: [plɛzɑ̃s]; Haitian Creole: Plezans) is a commune in the Plaisance Arrondissement, in the Nord department of Haiti. It has 50,367 inhabitants.

Morne Bedoret is a nearby peak which is 543 m high. Fort Bedourete was here.
