= Grand-Boucan =

Grand-Boucan Gran Boukan
- Commune
- Interactive map of Grand-Boucan
- Location in Haiti
- Coordinates: 18°33′0″N 73°36′0″W
- Country: Haiti
- Department: Nippes
- Arrondissement: Baradères

Area
  - Total: 44.49 km^{2} (17.18 sq mi)
- Elevation: 396 m (1,299 ft)

Population (2015)
  - Total: 5,815
  - Density: 130.7/km^{2} (338.5/sq mi)
- Time zone: UTC−05:00 (EST)
  - Summer (DST): UTC−04:00 (EDT)
- Postal code: HT 7521

Grand-Boucan (French pronunciation: [ɡʁɑ̃ bukɑ̃]; Haitian Creole: Gran Boukan) is a commune in the Baradères Arrondissement, in the Nippes department of Haiti.
