= Pignon =

Pignon Piyon
- Commune
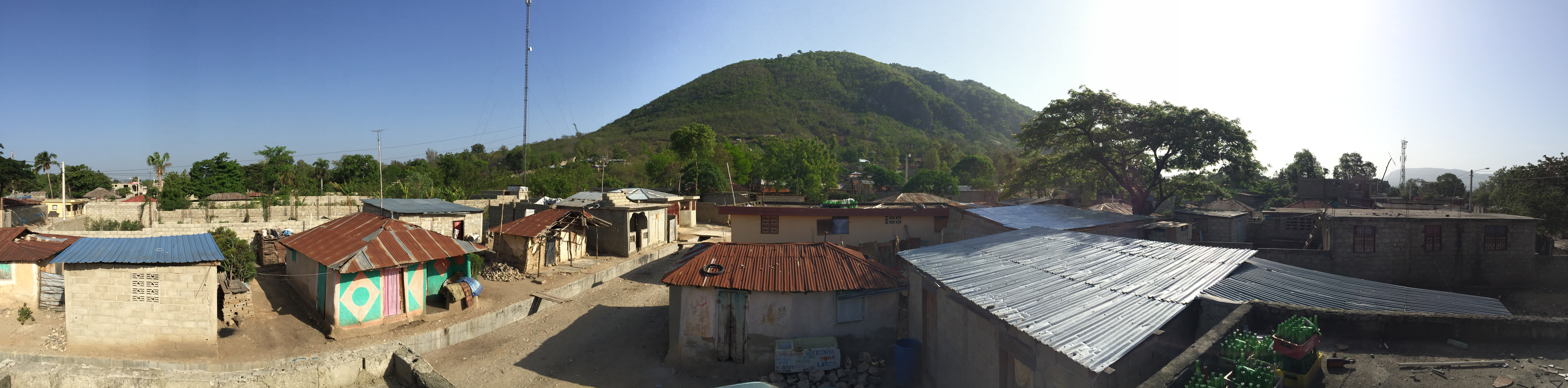
- View of Pignon

- Location in Haiti
- Coordinates: 19°20′15″N 72°06′55″W
- Country: Haiti
- Department: Nord
- Arrondissement: Saint-Raphaël
- Elevation: 358 m (1,175 ft)

Population (7 August 2003)
  - Total: 29,327
- Time zone: UTC-05:00 (EST)
  - Summer (DST): UTC-04:00 (EDT)

Pignon (French pronunciation: [piɲɔ̃]; Haitian Creole: Piyon) is a commune in the Saint-Raphaël Arrondissement, in the Nord department of Haiti. It has 29,327 inhabitants.

== Government ==
Pignon's territory includes the Sections Communales of Savanette and La Belle Mère. During the October 25, 2015 election, Mr. Peter Castin Constantin was elected as the Deputy for Pignon, Lavictoire, and Ranquite for 4 years. As for mayor Nicolas Victorin is Principal Mayor, aided by Maire Adjoint Henri-Claude Crepin and Mairesse Adjointe Mme.Jeanie Phenelus.

== History ==
Pignon is located at the border of the Central Plateau and North Departments. When France first acquired the western third of the island from Spain, Pignon laid right at the border of French and Spanish territories. It was founded in 1699 by Jean Guillaume de Pignon, one of the first French tradesmen and plantation owners who settled the western portion of Hispaniola after the Treaty of Ryswick with Spain. The vast valleys were suitable for tobacco, sugar cane, coffee, banana, mangoes, cocoa and animal production for export to France and trade with the Spanish neighbors in Hinche. The mountain chain overlooking the valleys provided protection against tropical storms and tornadoes, made the area even more desirable to Guillaume. Later, with over 700 male slaves in different plantations throughout the area, he and his family turned the area into a commercial trading hub of sort. He and his family settled the village, right at the foot of the mountain which bears his name to this day.

== Facilities ==
=== Transportation ===
Pignon Airport, a 3,500 ft long (1,100 m) grass landing strip is served by charter and scheduled air service, mostly to and from Port-au-Prince. Mission Aviation Fellowship operates scheduled flights to Pignon from Port-au-Prince out of the small Guy Malary Terminal at Toussaint Louverture International Airport on 1 PM on Mondays and Fridays. A tap-tap van also runs between Pignon and Port-au-Prince, usually picking up passengers in the afternoon in front of the International Terminal at Toussaint Louverture International Airport and traveling along RN3 through Mirebalais and Hinche before returning to Pignon at night.

Numerous other shared-ride trucks and buses run between Pignon and smaller surrounding communities. Shared trucks from a cooperative depot in Pignon provide transportation for merchants to sell their goods in the larger markets of Port-au-Prince and on different market days in other cities.

=== Education ===
==== Secondary schools ====
- Collège de la Grace, Caleb Lucien, Director
- Collège Frederick Marcellin, Jephthe Lucien, Director
- Lycée National de Pignon
- Collège Henry Christophe de Pignon
- Troisième Cycle Toussaint Lourverture
- Collège Mixte l'Union de Pignon
- Collège HAFF de Bohoc
- Collège Nouvelle Vision de Lajeune
- Collège Foi Chrétien de Lajeune
- Collège Notre dame du bon secours (CNDBS)

==== Primary schools ====
- École Saint Joseph
- École Nationale Capois La Mort
- École Baptiste Conservatrice
- École Baptiste Jerusalem
- Institution Vallee d'Adoration et Benediction (IVAB)
- Augmentation d'informations
- Collège Henry-Christaphe de Pignon CHCP

=== Health ===
Pignon has relatively high quality health care in the nation. Hôpital Bienfaisance is a well-equipped hospital with modern technology, many personnel and other resources to provide a wide range of advanced medical services. The Dispensaire St. Joseph de Pignon provides free and low-cost primary care, plus basic laboratory tests and dentistry, and maintains an on-site pharmacy.

Bon Secours Agrovet provides veterinary services and medications to Pignon and the surrounding region.

== Economy ==
Pignon is one of the country's top suppliers for sugarcane and alcohol. There are many and vast plantations of sugarcane. Back in the days, farmers used to make their living by providing syrup and molasses to companies like Welch. Now, planters use their sugarcane to make clarin and sell it to the local market and throughout the nation.

Pignon has its own electric grid and cooperative.
