= Plaine-du-Nord =

Plaine-du-Nord Plèn dinò
- Commune
- Plaine-du-Nord

- Location in Haiti
- Coordinates: 19°41′0″N 72°16′0″W
- Country: Haiti
- Department: Nord
- Arrondissement: Acul-du-Nord
- Elevation: 6 m (20 ft)

Population (7 August 2003)
  - Total: 28,544
- Time zone: UTC-05:00 (EST)
  - Summer (DST): UTC-04:00 (EDT)
- Communal Sections: 4

Plaine-du-Nord (French pronunciation: [plɛn dy nɔʁ]; Haitian Creole: Plèn dinò) is a commune in the Acul-du-Nord Arrondissement, in the Nord department of Haiti. It has 28,544 inhabitants.

== Communal Sections ==
The commune consists of four communal sections, namely:

- Morne Rouge, rural
- Basse Plaine, urban (town of Plaine-du-Nord) and rural
- Grand Boucan, urban (Robillard neighborhood) and rural
- Bassin Diamant, rural

== Notable people ==
Bermane Stiverne (Born 1978) – former WBC heavyweight world champion.
