= Mombin-Crochu =

Mombin-Crochu Monben Kwochi
- Commune
- Location in Haiti
- Coordinates: 19°22′0″N 71°59′0″W
- Country: Haiti
- Department: Nord-Est
- Arrondissement: Vallières
- Elevation: 583 m (1,913 ft)

Population (7 August 2003)
  - Total: 25,113
- Time zone: UTC-05:00 (EST)
  - Summer (DST): UTC-04:00 (EDT)

Mombin-Crochu (French pronunciation: [mɔ̃bɛ̃ kʁɔʃy]; Haitian Creole: Monben Kwochi) is a commune in the Vallières Arrondissement, in the Nord-Est department of Haiti. It has 25,113 inhabitants.

== Communal sections ==
The commune consists of two communal sections, namely:

- Sans Souci, urban and rural
- Bois Laurence, urban and rural, containing the town of Bois Laurence
