= Saint-Raphaël, Haiti =

Saint-Raphaël Sen Rafayèl
- Commune

- Location in Haiti
- Coordinates: 19°26′21″N 72°11′59″W
- Country: Haiti
- Department: Nord
- Arrondissement: Saint-Raphaël
- Founded in: 1761
- Founder: José de Guzmán y Meléndez, Viscount of San Rafael de la Angostura

Population (2009)
  - Total: 48,884
- Time zone: UTC-05:00 (EST)
  - Summer (DST): UTC-04:00 (EDT)

Saint-Raphaël (French pronunciation: [sɛ̃ ʁafaɛl]; Haitian Creole: Sen Rafayèl) is a commune in the Saint-Raphaël Arrondissement, Nord department of Haiti. It is the seat of Saint-Raphaël Arrondissement.

Saint-Raphaël is located at the intersection of Route 307 and National Route 3 between Cap-Haïtien and Hinche.

In plantations in Saint-Raphael, workers harvest green, bitter oranges, quarter them and then separate the peel from the pulp by hand. The peels are dried in the sun and then shipped to France, where they are macerated, distilled and blended with other ingredients to produce the world-famous liqueurs Grand Marnier and Cointreau manufactured by the French companies, Société des Produits Marnier-Lapostolle and Rémy Cointreau.

It was founded as San Rafael de La Angostura in 1761 by Canary Island colonists, mostly from Gran Canaria, although some important canaries came from the nearby town of Hinche. Its population increased somewhat significantly, reaching to take into 1783, 1,079 inhabitants.

The 1929 treaty and the clarifications in the 1936 revision were based partially on the idea that the county, whose citizens constituted the majority in an area, should be given jurisdiction for that area. The result of these negotiations was that the Dominican government gave up rights to a significant amount of territory.
