= Nord-Est (department) =

Department of Haiti

Coordinates: 19.6678°N 71.8397°W

Nord-Est Nòdès
- Department
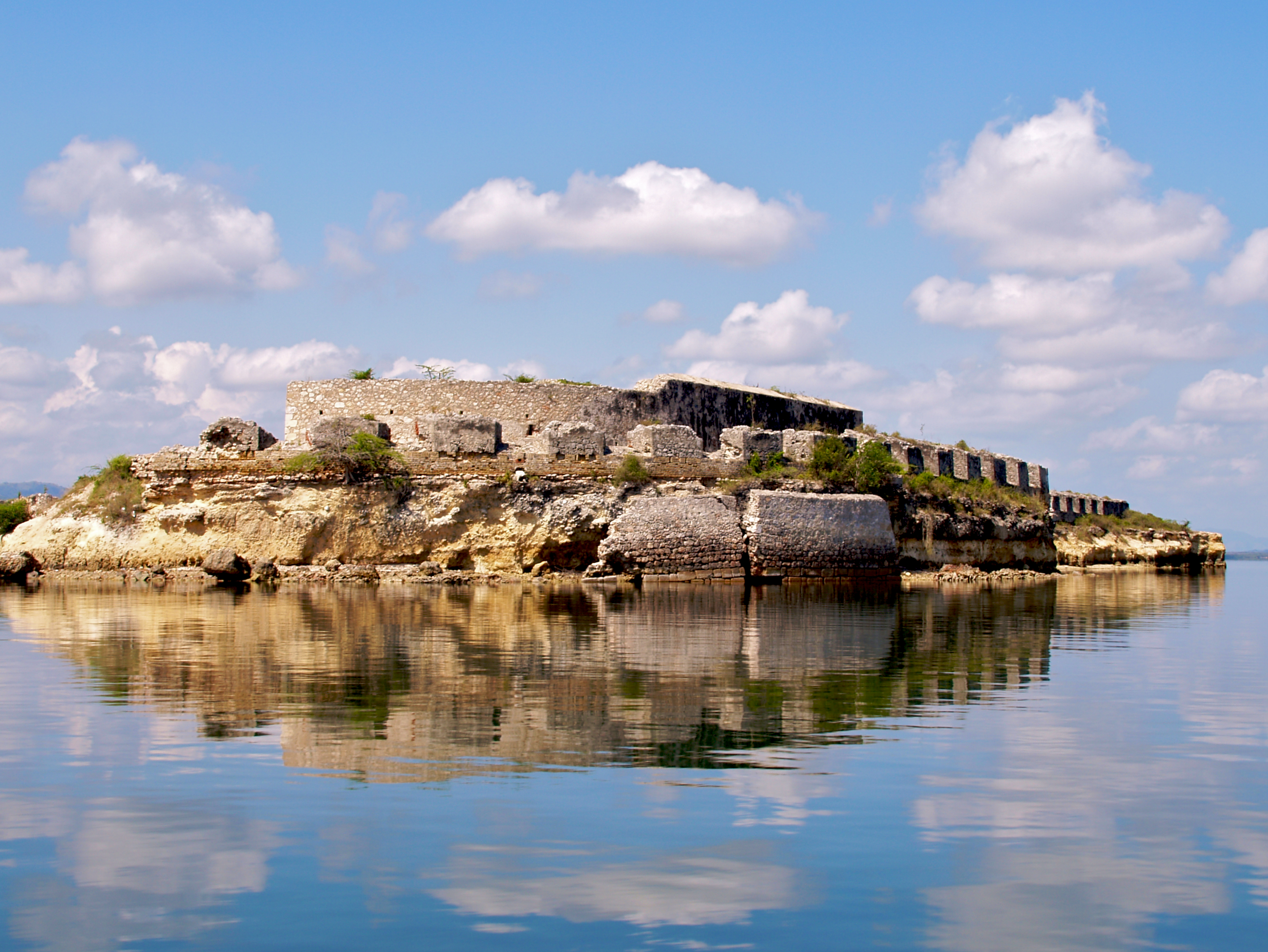
- Fort Saint Joseph

- Nord-Est in Haiti
- Country: Haiti
- Capital: Fort-Liberté
- Largest City: Ouanaminthe
- Région: Le Grand-Nord
- Symbole: Palm tree enclosed in a fort

Government
  - Type: Departmental Council

Area
  - Department: 1,622.93 km^{2} (626.62 sq mi)

Population (2015)
  - Department: 393,967
  - Density: 242.750/km^{2} (628.721/sq mi)
  - Urban: 190,926
  - Rural: 203,041
- Time zone: UTC-05:00 (EST)
  - Summer (DST): UTC-04:00 (EDT)
- ISO 3166 code: HT-NE
- HDI (2017): 0.472 low · 6th

Nord-Est (French, pronounced [nɔʁɛst]) or Nòdès (Haitian Creole; both meaning "North East") is one of the ten departments of Haiti, located in northern Haiti. It has an area of 1,623 km^{2} (627 sq mi), making it the smallest of all the departments. It had an estimated population of 393,967 as of 2015. Its capital is Fort-Liberté. It was a part of the Nord department.

== History ==
=== Taino Period ===
The department was part of the Taino kasika of Marien on the border with the Magua. The Taino settlement of Bayaha around the Fort-Liberté area.

=== Spanish Period ===
The city of Fort-Liberté is one of the earliest European settlements in the Caribbean with the creation of Puerto-Real (Port-Royal) in 1503.

=== French Period ===
After the Treaty of Ryswick, the town fell into the hands of the French and they establish the town of Fort-Dauphin the actual Fort-Liberty. Many times the Spanish of Montechristi attacks the French resulting in a massacre at the Massacre River. This was a precedent of the Trujillo induce, Haitian Massacre in Dajabòn in 1937, called the Parsley-Perejil Massacre.

The Nord-Est forms part of the northern plains, a historic site of colonial plantations and a key area for the cultivation of chestnut

=== Haitian Period ===
==== Haitian Revolution ====
Toussaint Brave freed the city of Fort Liberté on September 9, 1803. After the Battle of Vertières, on November 29, in the town of Fort-Liberté, Jean-Jacques Dessalines, Henry Christophe, and Auguste Clerveaux declared St-Domingue free and declared:

...in the name of the black people, and men of color of St. Domingo...Restored to our primitive dignity, we have asserted our rights; we swear never to yield them to any power on earth...

==== Independence ====
Toussaint Brave and Clearveaux of the Armée Indigène and followers of Toussaint Louverture, commander of the first division of the North signatories of the Haitian Declaration of Independence.

Clearveaux died suspectly just before Dessalines assassination.

King Henry was crowned in Fort-Liberté and changed the name to Fort-Royal.

The town played a big role in the fight against the occupation of the 1930s by the United States.

== Geography ==
It is bordered to the north by the Atlantic Ocean, to the south by the Centre department, to the east by the Dominican Republic through the province of Dajabon, and to the west by Nord Department.

Most of the department is part of the Plaine-du-Nord-Cibao-Valley with the southern part being the Massif-du-Nord. The coastal plain has the Bay of Caracol, the biggest mangrove forest in Haiti and the Bay of Fort-Liberty, the island's only bilobal pouched-shape bay of the island is 5 times the size of the Bay of Havana.

Tee bay harbors many islands, cays, and reefs. The biggest island in the Bay is Bayo Island.

The most important rivers are the Manon River and Massacre River.

Three Bays Protected Area is the most important park in the department.

== Economy ==
The economy of the department depends notably on commerce with Ounaminthes-Dajabon.

=== Tourism ===
The city of Fort-Liberté has known a reserge in touris-lokal.

=== Industry ===
The department has two industrial parks: Caracol and SONAPI.

== Transport ==
The RN3 connects the department to the Centre Department. The RN6 connects the department to the North Department and the Dominican Republic.

The port of Fort-Liberté is not open to foreign commerce.

== Administrative divisions ==
The Department of Nord-Est is subdivided into four arrondissements, which are further subdivided into thirteen communes.

- Fort-Liberté Arrondissement
  - Fort-Liberté
  - Ferrier
  - Perches
- Ouanaminthe Arrondissement
  - Ouanaminthe
  - Capotille
  - Mont-Organisé
- Trou-du-Nord Arrondissement
  - Trou-du-Nord
  - Caracol
  - Sainte-Suzanne
  - Terrier-Rouge
- Vallières Arrondissement
  - Vallières
  - Carice
  - Mombin-Crochu
