= Ranquitte =

Ranquitte Rankit
- Commune
- Location in Haiti
- Coordinates: 19°25′0″N 72°5′0″W
- Country: Haiti
- Department: Nord
- Arrondissement: Saint-Raphaël
- Elevation: 512 m (1,680 ft)

Population (7 August 2003)
  - Total: 18,197
- Time zone: UTC-05:00 (EST)
  - Summer (DST): UTC-04:00 (EDT)

Ranquitte (French pronunciation: [ʁɑ̃kit]; Haitian Creole: Rankit) is a commune in the Saint-Raphaël Arrondissement, in the Nord department of Haiti. It has 18,197 inhabitants.

The school in Ranquitte is the Spady-Calhoun school named partly in honor of one of its benefactors, Dr. Steven Spady of Hindman, KY. There is also a Health Clinic on campus there. Both the school and clinic are overseen by a Haitian staff and maintained by Christian Flights International, a non-profit missionary organization that has been sending trips into this area for over 40 years.
