= Vallières (commune) =

Vallières Valyè
- Commune
- Location in Haiti
- Coordinates: 19°26′0″N 71°55′0″W
- Country: Haiti
- Department: Nord-Est
- Arrondissement: Vallières
- Elevation: 36 m (118 ft)

Population (7 August 2003)
  - Total: 17,470
- Time zone: UTC-05:00 (EST)
  - Summer (DST): UTC-04:00 (EDT)

Vallières (French pronunciation: [valjɛʁ]; Haitian Creole: Valyè) is a commune in the Vallières Arrondissement, in the Nord-Est department of Haiti. It has 17,470 inhabitants.

== Communal Sections ==
The commune consists of three communal sections, namely:

- Trois Palmistes, urban and rural, containing the village of Vallières
- Ecrevisse or Grosse Roche, urban and rural, containing the village of Grosse Roche
- Corosse, rural
