= Cap-Haïtien Arrondissement =

Coordinates: 19.75°N 72.2°W

Cap-Haïtien Arrondissement Arrondissement de Cap-Haïtien Awondisman Kap Ayisyen
- Arrondissement
- Interactive map of Cap-Haïtien Arrondissement
- Country: Haiti
- Department: Nord

Area
  - Arrondissement: 245.76 km^{2} (94.89 sq mi)
  - Urban: 27.14 km^{2} (10.48 sq mi)
  - Rural: 218.62 km^{2} (84.41 sq mi)

Population (2015)
  - Arrondissement: 356,908
  - Density: 1,452.3/km^{2} (3,761.3/sq mi)
  - Urban: 295,607
  - Rural: 61,301
- Time zone: UTC-5 (Eastern)
- Postal code: HT11—
- Communes: 3
- Communal Sections: 8
- IHSI Code: 031

Cap-Haïtien (Haitian Creole: Kap Ayisyen) is an arrondissement in the Nord department of Haiti and is the second-most important city of the country. It is known as the historical and tourism capital of the country. Cap-Haïtien was founded in 1670 by the French settler Bertrand d'Ogeron de La Bouëre. As of 2015, the population was 356,908 inhabitants. The city is governed by three mayors elected by popular vote every 5 years and also represented in the National Assembly of Haiti with one member elected every 4 years. Postal codes in Cap-Haïtien Arrondissement start with the number 11.

The arrondissement consists of the following communes:

- Cap-Haïtien
- Quartier-Morin
- Limonade
