= Vallières Arrondissement =

Coordinates: 19.4333°N 71.9167°W

Vallières Arrondissement Arrondissement de Vallières Awondisman Valyè
- Arrondissement
- Interactive map of Vallières Arrondissement
- Country: Haiti
- Department: Nord-Est

Area
  - Arrondissement: 405.94 km^{2} (156.73 sq mi)
  - Urban: 4.25 km^{2} (1.64 sq mi)
  - Rural: 401.69 km^{2} (155.09 sq mi)

Population (2015)
  - Arrondissement: 71,851
  - Density: 177.00/km^{2} (458.43/sq mi)
  - Urban: 14,604
  - Rural: 57,247
- Time zone: UTC-5 (Eastern)
- Postal code: HT24—
- Communes: 3
- Communal Sections: 7
- IHSI Code: 044

Vallières (Haitian Creole: Valyè) is an arrondissement in the Nord-Est department of Haiti. As of 2015, the population was 71,851 inhabitants. Postal codes in the Vallières Arrondissement start with the number 24.

The arrondissement consists of the following communes:

- Vallières
- Carice
- Mombin-Crochu
