= Acul-du-Nord Arrondissement =

Coordinates: 19.6833°N 72.3167°W

Acul-du-Nord Arrondissement Arrondissement d'Acul-du-Nord Awondisman Akil dinò
- Arrondissement
- Interactive map of Acul-du-Nord Arrondissement
- Country: Haiti
- Department: Nord

Area
  - Arrondissement: 358.70 km^{2} (138.49 sq mi)
  - Urban: 12.08 km^{2} (4.66 sq mi)
  - Rural: 346.62 km^{2} (133.83 sq mi)

Population (2015)
  - Arrondissement: 129,155
  - Density: 360.06/km^{2} (932.56/sq mi)
  - Urban: 38,942
  - Rural: 90,213
- Time zone: UTC-5 (Eastern)
- Postal code: HT12—
- Communes: 3
- Communal Sections: 13
- IHSI Code: 032

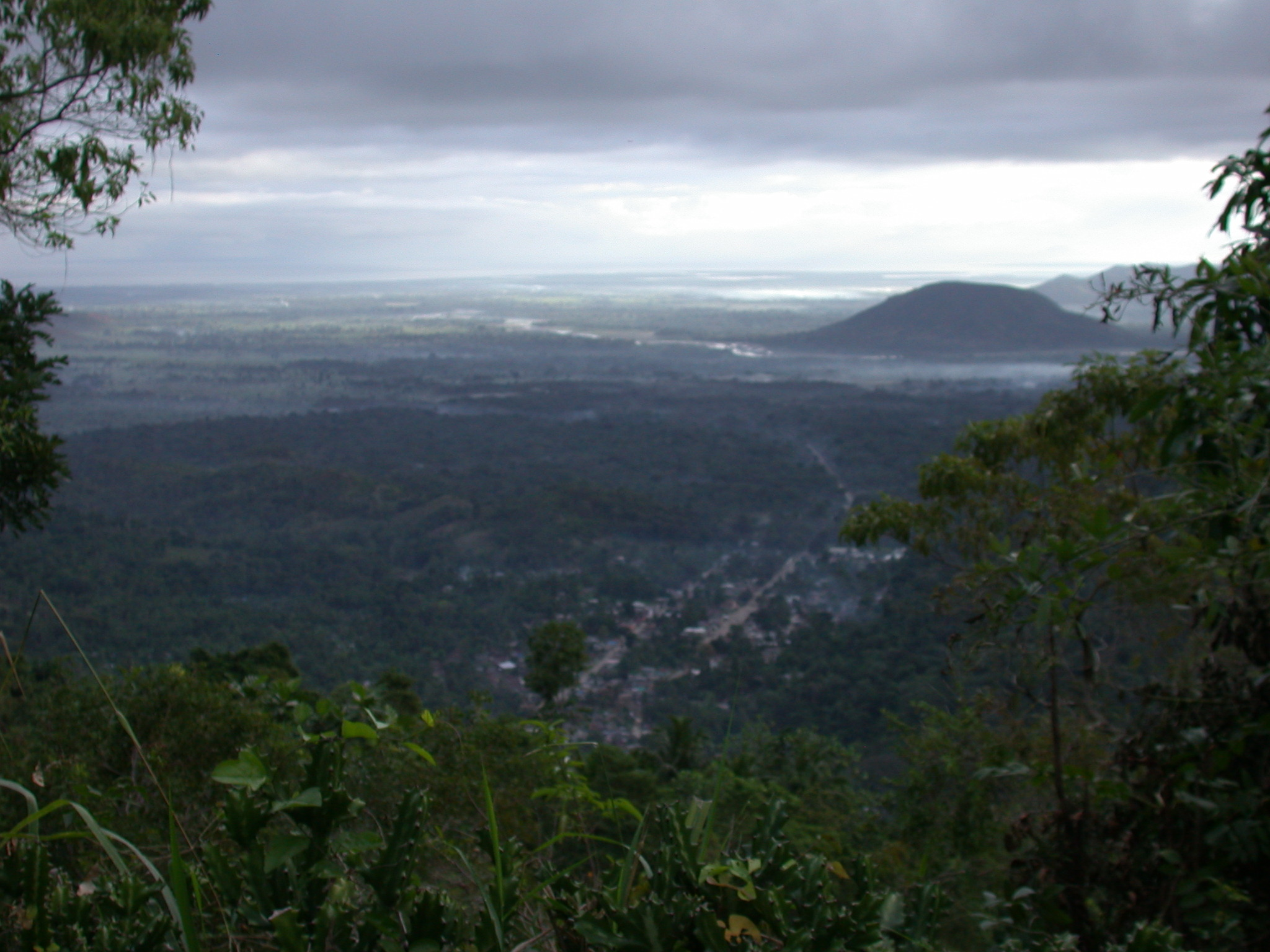
Picture of Nord, Haiti

Acul-du-Nord (French pronunciation: [akyl dy nɔʁ]; Haitian Creole: Akil dinò) is an arrondissement of the Nord department of Haiti. As of 2015, the population was 129,155 inhabitants. Postal codes in the Acul-du-Nord Arrondissement start with the number 12.

== Municipalities ==
The arrondissement consists of the following municipalities:

- Acul-du-Nord
- Plaine-du-Nord
- Milot
