= Ouanaminthe Arrondissement =

Coordinates: 19.550°N 71.724°W

Ouanaminthe Arrondissement Arrondissement d'Ouanaminthe Awondisman Wanament
- Arrondissement
- Interactive map of Ouanaminthe Arrondissement
- Country: Haiti
- Department: Nord-Est

Area
  - Arrondissement: 362.24 km^{2} (139.86 sq mi)
  - Urban: 4.31 km^{2} (1.66 sq mi)
  - Rural: 357.93 km^{2} (138.20 sq mi)

Population (2015)
  - Arrondissement: 146,484
  - Density: 404.38/km^{2} (1,047.3/sq mi)
  - Urban: 76,992
  - Rural: 69,492
- Time zone: UTC-5 (Eastern)
- Postal code: HT22—
- Communes: 3
- Communal Sections: 9
- IHSI Code: 042

Ouanaminthe (French pronunciation: [wanamɛ̃t]; Haitian Creole: Wanament) is an arrondissement in the Nord-Est department of Haiti. As of 2015, the population was 146,484 inhabitants. Postal codes in the Ouanaminthe Arrondissement start with the number 22.

The arrondissement consists of the following municipalities:

- Ouanaminthe
- Capotille
- Mont-Organisé
