= Borgne Arrondissement =

Coordinates: 19.85°N 72.5331°W

Borgne Arrondissement Arrondissement de Borgne Awondisman Obòy
- Arrondissement
- Interactive map of Borgne Arrondissement
- Country: Haiti
- Department: Nord

Area
  - Arrondissement: 327.28 km^{2} (126.36 sq mi)
  - Urban: 3.59 km^{2} (1.39 sq mi)
  - Rural: 323.69 km^{2} (124.98 sq mi)

Population (2015)
  - Arrondissement: 116,800
  - Density: 356.9/km^{2} (924.3/sq mi)
  - Urban: 33,077
  - Rural: 83,723
- Time zone: UTC-5 (Eastern)
- Postal code: HT15—
- Communes: 2
- Communal Sections: 13
- IHSI Code: 035

Borgne (Haitian Creole: Obòy) is an arrondissement in the Nord department of Haiti. As of 2015, the population was 116,800 inhabitants. Postal codes in the Borgne Arrondissement start with the number 15.

The arrondissement consists of the following municipalities:

- Borgne
- Port-Margot
