= Fort-Liberté Arrondissement =

Coordinates: 19.6667°N 71.8333°W

Fort-Liberté Arrondissement Arrondissement de Fort-Liberté Awondisman Fòlibète
- Arrondissement
- Interactive map of Fort-Liberté Arrondissement
- Country: Haiti
- Department: Nord-Est

Area
  - Arrondissement: 349.92 km^{2} (135.10 sq mi)
  - Urban: 6.36 km^{2} (2.46 sq mi)
  - Rural: 343.56 km^{2} (132.65 sq mi)

Population (2015)
  - Arrondissement: 60,632
  - Density: 173.27/km^{2} (448.78/sq mi)
  - Urban: 42,630
  - Rural: 18,002
- Time zone: UTC-5 (Eastern)
- Postal code: HT21—
- Communes: 3
- Communal Sections: 7
- IHSI Code: 041

Fort-Liberté (Haitian Creole: Fòlibète) is an arrondissement in the Nord-Est department of Haiti. As of 2015, the population was 60,632 inhabitants. Postal codes in the Fort-Liberté Arrondissement start with the number 21.

The arrondissement consists of the following communes:

- Fort-Liberté
- Ferrier
- Perches
