= Plaisance Arrondissement =

Coordinates: 19.6°N 72.4667°W

Plaisance Arrondissement Arrondissement de Plaisance Awondisman Plezans
- Arrondissement
- Interactive map of Plaisance Arrondissement
- Country: Haiti
- Department: Nord

Area
  - Arrondissement: 242.32 km^{2} (93.56 sq mi)
  - Urban: 3.08 km^{2} (1.19 sq mi)
  - Rural: 239.24 km^{2} (92.37 sq mi)

Population (2015)
  - Arrondissement: 123,633
  - Density: 510.21/km^{2} (1,321.4/sq mi)
  - Urban: 27,896
  - Rural: 95,737
- Time zone: UTC-5 (Eastern)
- Postal code: HT17—
- Communes: 2
- Communal Sections: 16
- IHSI Code: 037

Plaisance (Haitian Creole: Plezans) is an arrondissement in the Nord Department of Haiti. As of 2015, the population was 123,633 inhabitants. Postal codes in the Plaisance Arrondissement start with the number 17.

== Geography ==
According to the Haitian Institute of Statistics and Informatics, the arrondissement has a total area of 93.56 square miles (242.32 km^{2}).

== Demographics ==
=== 2003 Census ===
As of the census of 2003, there were 90,812 people residing in the arrondissement.

=== 2009 Estimated Census ===
As of the estimated census of 2009, there were 112,428 people and 22,010 households residing in the arrondissement.

Postal codes in the Plaisance Arrondissement start with the number 17 .

=== 2019 Estimated Census ===
The demographic information for Plaisance Arrondissement as of 2019 is as follows:

- Gender Distribution: There were 913 males and 1,208 females.
- Age Groups: The population was distributed across various age groups with 317 individuals aged 0–17 years, and 1,550 individuals aged 18–64 years.
- Age Distribution: More specifically, there were 286 people aged 0–14 years, 697 people aged 15–29 years, 415 people aged 30–44 years, 362 people aged 45–59 years, 257 people aged 60–74 years, and 104 people aged 75 years and above.
- Citizenship: Among the residents, 1,796 were French citizens, and 325 held foreign citizenship.
- Immigration Status: The area had 1,704 individuals who were not immigrants and 418 immigrants.

== Municipalities ==
The arrondissement consists of the following communes :

- Plaisance
- Pilate
