= Saint-Raphaël Arrondissement =

Coordinates: 19.4225°N 72.1997°W

Saint-Raphaël Arrondissement Arrondissement de Saint-Raphaël Awondisman Sen Rafayèl
- Arrondissement
- Interactive map of Saint-Raphaël Arrondissement
- Country: Haiti
- Department: Nord

Area
  - Arrondissement: 557.58 km^{2} (215.28 sq mi)
  - Urban: 4.71 km^{2} (1.82 sq mi)
  - Rural: 552.87 km^{2} (213.46 sq mi)

Population (2015)
  - Arrondissement: 169,867
  - Density: 304.65/km^{2} (789.04/sq mi)
  - Urban: 55,681
  - Rural: 114,186
- Time zone: UTC-5 (Eastern)
- Postal code: HT14—
- Communes: 5
- Communal Sections: 15
- IHSI Code: 034

Saint-Raphaël (Haitian Creole: Sen Rafayèl) is an arrondissement in the Nord department of Haiti. As of 2015, the population was 169,867 inhabitants. Postal codes in the Saint-Raphaël Arrondissement start with the number 14.

== Communes ==
The arrondissement consists of the following communes:

- Dondon
- La Victoire
- Pignon
- Ranquitte
- Saint-Raphaël

== History ==
In the wake of the 2010 Haiti earthquake, food had become short in supply. On 31 January 2010, a food shipment sent through the Pignon Airport, for an orphanage in the commune of Pignon, was looted just after leaving the airport gates. A negotiation between aide shippers and the local mayor lead to a partitioning of food aide between the orphanage and the rest of the population.
