= Baradères Arrondissement =

Coordinates: 18°31′N 73°21′W

Baradères Arrondissement Arrondissement de Baradères Awondisman Baradè
- Arrondissement
- Interactive map of Baradères Arrondissement
- Country: Haiti
- Department: Nippes

Area
  - Arrondissement: 237.20 km^{2} (91.58 sq mi)
  - Urban: 8.52 km^{2} (3.29 sq mi)
  - Rural: 228.68 km^{2} (88.29 sq mi)

Population (2015)
  - Arrondissement: 47,060
  - Density: 198.4/km^{2} (513.8/sq mi)
  - Urban: 9,072
  - Rural: 37,988
- Time zone: UTC-5 (Eastern)
- Postal code: HT75—
- Communes: 2
- Communal Sections: 7
- IHSI Code: 103

Baradères (Haitian Creole: Baradè) is an arrondissement in the Nippes department of Haiti. As of 2015, the population was 47,060 inhabitants. Postal codes in the Baradères Arrondissement start with the number 75.

The arrondissement consists of the following communes:

- Baradères
- Grand-Boucan
