= Limbé Arrondissement =

Coordinates: 19.7056°N 72.4147°W

Limbé Arrondissement Arrondissement de Limbé Awondisman Lenbe
- Arrondissement
- Interactive map of Limbé Arrondissement
- Country: Haiti
- Department: Nord

Area
  - Arrondissement: 178.74 km^{2} (69.01 sq mi)
  - Urban: 4.15 km^{2} (1.60 sq mi)
  - Rural: 174.59 km^{2} (67.41 sq mi)

Population (2015)
  - Arrondissement: 106,201
  - Density: 594.16/km^{2} (1,538.9/sq mi)
  - Urban: 67,159
  - Rural: 39,042
- Time zone: UTC-5 (Eastern)
- Postal code: HT16—
- Communes: 2
- Communal Sections: 8
- IHSI Code: 036

Limbé (French pronunciation: [lɛ̃be]; Haitian Creole: Lenbe) is an arrondissement in the Nord department of Haiti. As of 2015, the population was 106,201 inhabitants. Postal codes in the Limbé Arrondissement start with the number 16.

The arrondissement consists of the following municipalities:

- Limbé
- Bas-Limbé
- Labadee
