= Grande-Rivière-du-Nord Arrondissement =

Coordinates: 19.4669°N 72.1169°W

Grande-Rivière-du-Nord Arrondissement Arrondissement de Grande-Rivière-du-Nord Awondisman Grann Rivyè dinò
- Arrondissement
- Interactive map of Grande-Rivière-du-Nord Arrondissement
- Country: Haiti
- Department: Nord

Area
  - Arrondissement: 204.53 km^{2} (78.97 sq mi)
  - Urban: 1.18 km^{2} (0.46 sq mi)
  - Rural: 203.35 km^{2} (78.51 sq mi)

Population (2015)
  - Arrondissement: 64,613
  - Density: 315.91/km^{2} (818.20/sq mi)
  - Urban: 20,513
  - Rural: 44,100
- Time zone: UTC-5 (Eastern)
- Postal code: HT13—
- Communes: 2
- Communal Sections: 9
- IHSI Code: 033

Grande-Rivière-du-Nord (Haitian Creole: Grann Rivyè dinò) is an arrondissement in the Nord Department of Haiti. As of 2015, the population was 64,613. The arrondissement consists of the Grande-Rivière-du-Nord and Bahon communes.

Postal codes in the arrondissement start with the number 13.
