= List of communes of Haiti =

Overview of Haitian communes

Communes in Haiti

The commune (French pronunciation: [kɔmyn]) is the third-level divisions of Haiti. The 10 departments have 41 arrondissements, which are divided into 146 communes and then into 571 communal sections.

Communes are roughly equivalent to civil townships and incorporated municipalities.

== Administration ==
Each commune has a municipal council (conseil municipal) composed of three members elected by the inhabitants of the commune for a 4-year term. The municipal council is led by a president often called mayor.

Each commune has a municipal assembly (assemblée municipale) who assists the council in its work. The members of the assembly are also elected for 4 years.

Each commune is ruled by a municipality.

== List ==
=== Artibonite ===
- Dessalines Arrondissement
  - Dessalines
  - Desdunes
  - Grande-Saline
  - Petite Rivière de l'Artibonite
- Gonaïves Arrondissement
  - Gonaïves
  - Ennery
  - L'Estère
- Gros Morne Arrondissement
  - Gros-Morne
  - Anse-Rouge
  - Terre-Neuve
- Marmelade Arrondissement
  - Marmelade
  - Saint-Michel-de-l'Atalaye
- Saint-Marc Arrondissement
  - Saint-Marc
  - Les Arcadins
  - La Chapelle
  - Liancourt
  - Verrettes
  - Montrouis

=== Centre ===
- Cerca-la-Source Arrondissement
  - Cerca-la-Source
  - Thomassique
- Hinche Arrondissement
  - Hinche
  - Cerca-Carvajal
  - Maïssade
  - Thomonde
- Lascahobas Arrondissement
  - Lascahobas
  - Baptiste
  - Belladère
  - Savanette
- Mirebalais Arrondissement
  - Mirebalais
  - Boucan-Carré
  - Saut-d'Eau

=== Grand'Anse ===
- Anse d'Hainault Arrondissement
  - Anse-d'Hainault
  - Dame-Marie
  - Les Irois
- Corail Arrondissement
  - Beaumont
  - Corail
  - Pestel
  - Roseaux
- Jérémie Arrondissement
  - Jérémie
  - Abricots
  - Bonbon
  - Chambellan
  - Marfranc
  - Moron

=== Nippes ===
- Anse-à-Veau Arrondissement
  - Anse-à-Veau
  - Arnaud
  - L'Asile
  - Petit-Trou-de-Nippes
  - Plaisance-du-Sud
- Baradères Arrondissement
  - Baradères
  - Grand-Boucan
- Miragoâne Arrondissement
  - Miragoâne
  - Fonds-des-Nègres
  - Paillant
  - Petite-Rivière-de-Nippes

=== Nord ===
- Acul-du-Nord Arrondissement
  - Acul-du-Nord
  - Milot
  - Plaine-du-Nord
- Borgne Arrondissement
  - Borgne
  - Port-Margot
- Cap-Haïtien Arrondissement
  - Cap-Haïtien
  - Limonade
  - Quartier-Morin
- Grande-Rivière-du-Nord Arrondissement
  - Grande-Rivière-du-Nord
  - Bahon
- Limbé Arrondissement
  - Limbé
  - Bas-Limbé
- Plaissance Arrondissement
  - Plaisance
  - Pilate
- Saint-Raphaël Arrondissement
  - Saint-Raphaël
  - Dondon
  - La Victoire
  - Pignon
  - Ranquitte

=== Nord-Est ===
- Fort-Liberté Arrondissement
  - Fort-Liberté
  - Perches
  - Ferrier
- Ouanaminthe Arrondissement
  - Ouanaminthe
  - Capotille
  - Mont-Organisé
- Trou-du-Nord Arrondissement
  - Trou-du-Nord
  - Caracol
  - Sainte-Suzanne
  - Grand-Bassin
  - Terrier-Rouge
- Vallières Arrondissement
  - Vallières
  - Carice
  - Mombin-Crochu

=== Nord-Ouest ===
- Môle-Saint-Nicolas Arrondissement
  - Môle-Saint-Nicolas
  - Baie-de-Henne
  - Bombardopolis
  - Jean-Rabel
- Port-de-Paix Arrondissement
  - Port-de-Paix
  - Bassin-Bleu
  - Chansolme
  - Lapointe
  - La Tortue
- Saint-Louis-du-Nord Arrondissement
  - Saint-Louis-du-Nord
  - Anse-à-Foleur

=== Ouest ===
- Arcahaie Arrondissement
  - Arcahaie
  - Cabaret
- Croix-des-Bouquets Arrondissement
  - Croix-des-Bouquets
  - Cornillon
  - Fonds-Verrettes
  - Ganthier
  - Thomazeau
- La Gonâve Arrondissement
  - Anse-à-Galets
  - Pointe-à-Raquette
- Léogâne Arrondissement
  - Léogâne
  - Grand-Goâve
  - Petit-Goâve
- Port-au-Prince Arrondissement
  - Port-au-Prince
  - Carrefour
  - Cité Soleil
  - Delmas
  - Gressier
  - Kenscoff
  - Pétion-Ville
  - Tabarre

=== Sud-Est ===
- Bainet Arrondissement
  - Bainet
  - Côtes-de-Fer
- Belle-Anse Arrondissement
  - Belle-Anse
  - Anse-à-Pitres
  - Grand-Gosier
  - Thiotte
- Jacmel Arrondissement
  - Jacmel
  - Cayes-Jacmel
  - La Vallée
  - Marigot

=== Sud ===
- Aquin Arrondissement
  - Aquin
  - Cavaillon
  - Saint-Louis-du-Sud
  - Fond-des-Blancs
- Les Cayes Arrondissement
  - Les Cayes
  - Camp-Perrin
  - Chantal
  - Île-à-Vache
  - Maniche
  - Torbeck
- Chardonnières Arrondissement
  - Chardonnières
  - Les Anglais
  - Tiburon
- Côteaux Arrondissement
  - Côteaux
  - Port-à-Piment
  - Roche-à-Bateaux
- Port-Salut Arrondissement
  - Port-Salut
  - Arniquet
  - Saint-Jean-du-Sud

== See also ==
- Administrative divisions of Haiti
- Departments of Haiti
- Arrondissements of Haiti
- Communal section
- List of cities in Haiti
