= Trou-du-Nord Arrondissement =

Coordinates: 19.6333°N 72.0167°W

Trou-du-Nord Arrondissement Arrondissement de Trou-du-Nord Awondisman Twou dinò
- Arrondissement
- Interactive map of Trou-du-Nord Arrondissement
- Country: Haiti
- Department: Nord-Est

Area
  - Arrondissement: 504.83 km^{2} (194.92 sq mi)
  - Urban: 7.42 km^{2} (2.86 sq mi)
  - Rural: 497.41 km^{2} (192.05 sq mi)

Population (2015)
  - Arrondissement: 115,000
  - Density: 228/km^{2} (590/sq mi)
  - Urban: 56,700
  - Rural: 58,300
- Time zone: UTC-5 (Eastern)
- Postal code: HT23—
- Communes: 4
- Communal Sections: 13
- IHSI Code: 043

Trou-du-Nord (Haitian Creole: Twou dinò) is an arrondissement in the Nord-Est department of Haiti. As of 2015, the population was 115,000 inhabitants. Postal codes in the Trou-du-Nord Arrondissement start with the number 23.

The arrondissement consists of the following communes:

- Trou-du-Nord
- Sainte-Suzanne
- Terrier-Rouge
- Caracol
