= Pilate, Haiti =

Pilate Pilat
- Commune
- Location in Haiti
- Coordinates: 19°40′0″N 72°33′0″W
- Country: Haiti
- Department: Nord
- Arrondissement: Plaisance
- Elevation: 319 m (1,047 ft)

Population (7 August 2003)
  - Total: 40,445
- Time zone: UTC-05:00 (EST)
  - Summer (DST): UTC-04:00 (EDT)

Pilate (French pronunciation: [pilat]; Haitian Creole: Pilat) is a commune in the Plaisance Arrondissement, in the Nord department of Haiti. It has 40,445 inhabitants.
