= Port-Margot =

Port-Margot Pò Mago
- Commune
- Location in Haiti
- Coordinates: 19°45′0″N 72°26′0″W
- Country: Haiti
- Department: Nord
- Arrondissement: Borgne
- Elevation: 108 m (354 ft)

Population (7 August 2003)
  - Total: 36,937
- Time zone: UTC-05:00 (EST)
  - Summer (DST): UTC-04:00 (EDT)

Port-Margot (French pronunciation: [pɔʁ maʁɡo]; Haitian Creole: Pò Mago) is a commune in the Borgne Arrondissement, in the Nord department of Haiti. It has 36,937 inhabitants.

== Communal Sections ==
The commune consists of six communal sections, namely:

- Grande Plaine, rural
- Bas Petit Borgne, urban (town of Port-Margot) and rural
- Corail, rural
- Haut Petit Borgne, rural
- Bas Quartier, urban (Bayeux neighborhood) and rural
- Bras Gauche, urban (Petit Bourg de Port-Margot neighborhood) and rural
