= Nord (Haitian department) =

Department of Haiti

Coordinates: 19.7667°N 72.2°W

Nord Nò
- Department
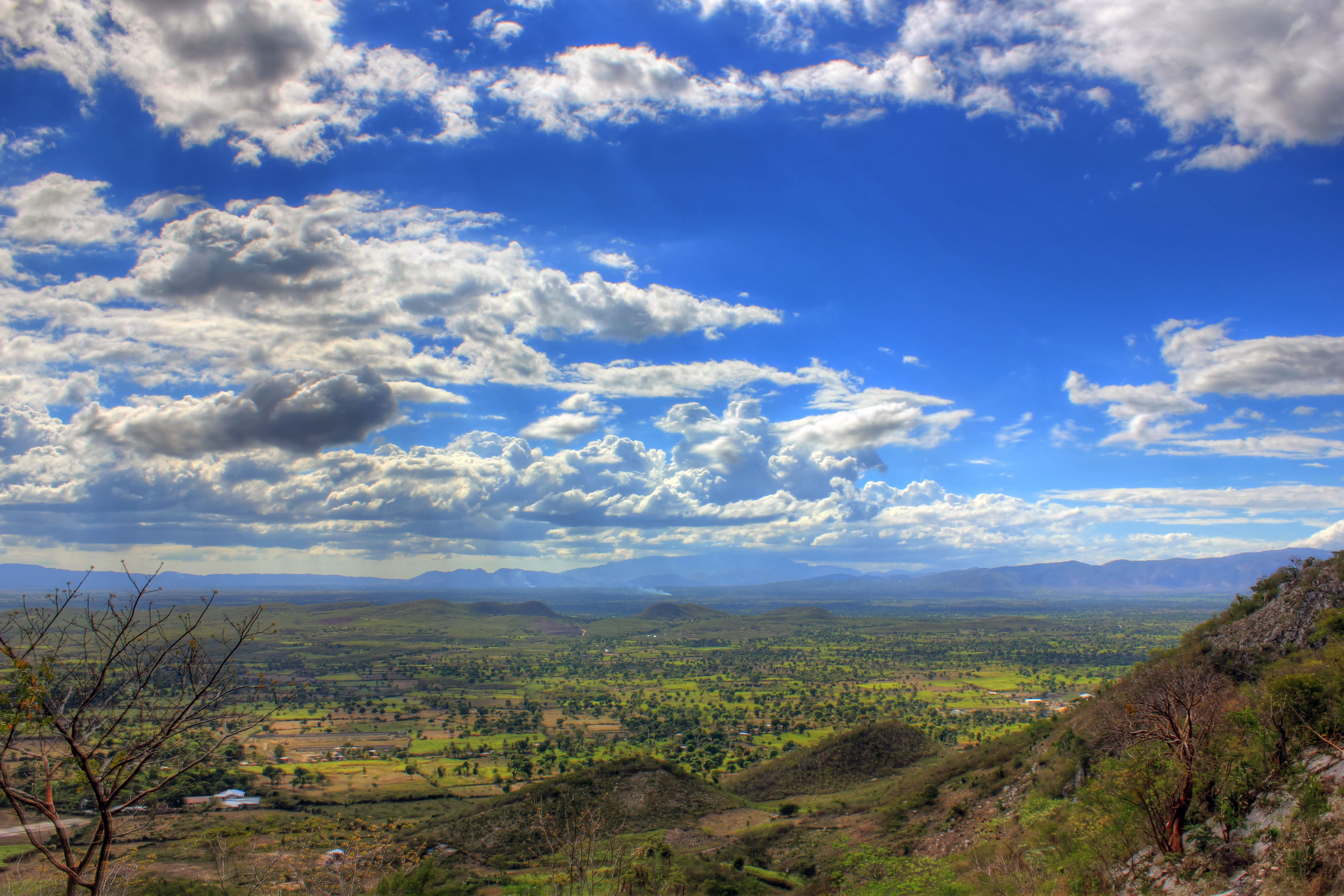
- La Belle Mère

- Nord in Haiti
- Country: Haiti
- Capital: Cap-Haïtien
- Région: Le Grand-Nord
- Symbole: Henry's Coat of Arms

Government
  - Type: Departmental Council

Area
  - Department: 2,114.91 km^{2} (816.57 sq mi)

Population (2015)
  - Department: 1,067,177
  - Density: 504.597/km^{2} (1,306.90/sq mi)
  - Urban: 538,875
  - Rural: 528,302
- Time zone: UTC-05:00 (EST)
  - Summer (DST): UTC-04:00 (EDT)
- ISO 3166 code: HT-ND
- HDI (2022): 0.556 medium · 2nd

Nord (French, pronounced [nɔʁ]) or Nò (Haitian Creole, pronounced [nɔ]; both meaning "North") is one of the ten departments of Haiti and located in northern Haiti. It has an area of 2,114.91 km^{2} (816.57 sq mi) and a population of 1,067,177 (2015). Its capital is Cap-Haïtien.

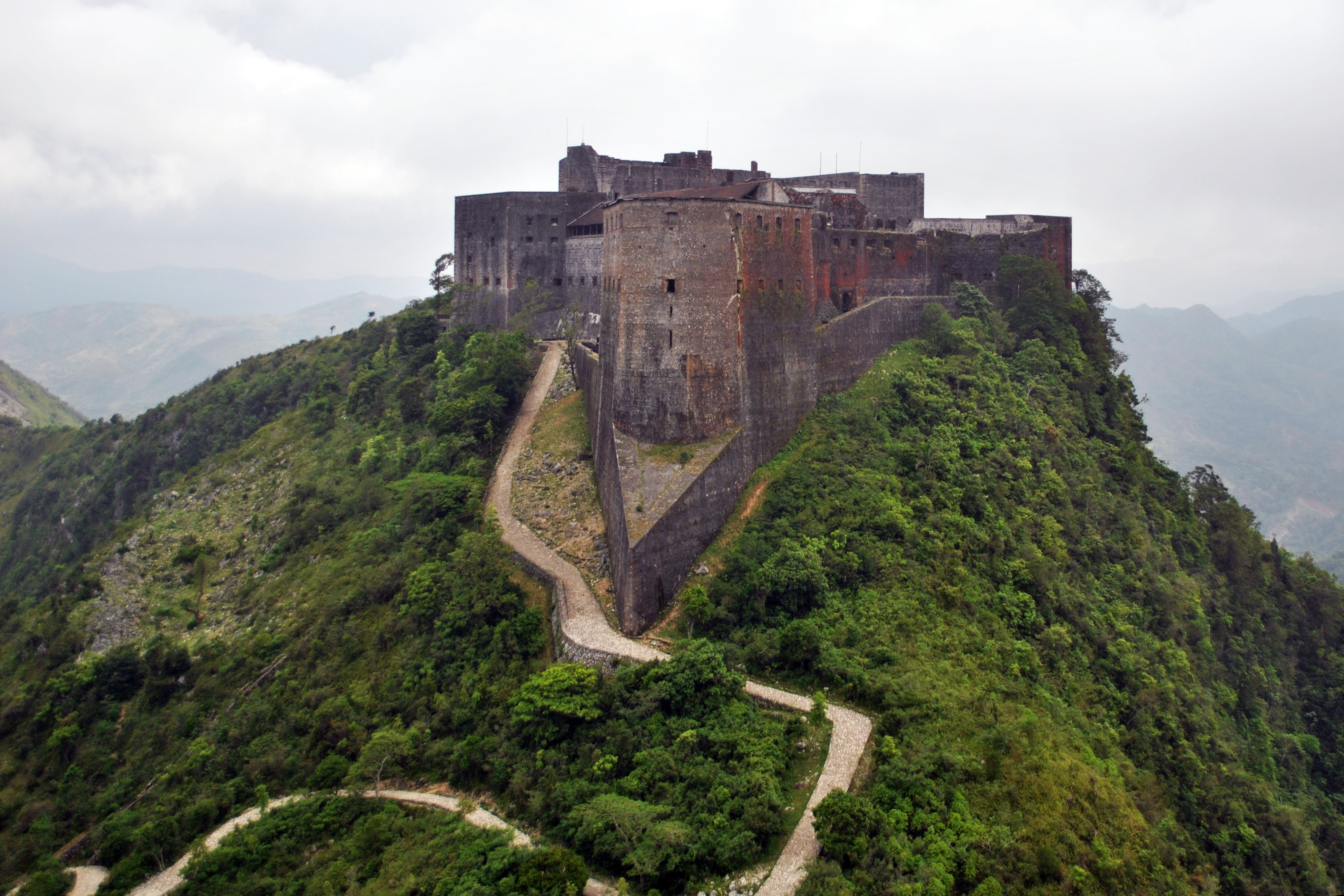
Citadelle Laferrière Aerial View

== History ==
=== Taino period ===
The department was part of the Chiefdom of Marien with settlements such as Guarico in Limonade and Guanawari in Grande-Rivière-du-Nord.

=== Spanish period ===
After the arrival of Columbus, the Taino granted the Spanish land to build the fort Navidad with their shipwreck, the first Colombian-era shelter built by Europeans in America. The fort was destroyed by Caonabo, leader of the Maguana, in response to the Europeans abusing their stay and locals. The Europeans moved eastward to actual la Isabella in the Dominican Republic.

=== French period ===
After the treaty of Ryswick, the French administer the west side of the island. The capital of the colony from 1697 to 1751 has been Cap-François, the actual Cap-Haitian. The department was the most densely populated with enslaved Africain, making it the beginning with the Bwa-Kayiman and the end with the Battle of Vertières of the Haitian Revolution. In 1789 the Nord Department on the northern shore was the most fertile area with the largest sugar plantations. It was an area of vast economic importance. Here most of the slaves lived in relative isolation, separated from the rest of the colony by a high mountain range known as the Massif. This area was a stronghold of the wealthy planters who wanted greater autonomy for the colony, especially economically, so they could do as they pleased.

=== Haitian Revolution ===
Many rebellions have taken place in Haiti notably in the North even before 1791 such as the Makandal Rebellion or the Ogé and Chavannes Insurrection. August 1791 becomes important as a Jamaican maroon Duty Boukmann and manbo or Vodoun priestess Cecile Fatiman organized the enslaved from different African nations. One week after that Congress and essentially what some scholars call the first Haitian Vodoun ceremony the general rebellion has started being led by Toussaint, Dessalines, Papillon, Biassou and many more. Within the next ten days slaves had taken control of the entire northern province in an unprecedented slave revolt that left the whites controlling only a few isolated fortified camps. Within the next two months as the violence escalated, the rebelling slaves killed 2,000 whites and burned or destroyed 280 sugar plantations. Within a year the island was in revolutionary chaos. Slaves burned the plantations where they had been forced to work, and killed masters, overseers, and other whites. This was the beginning of the Haitian Revolution.

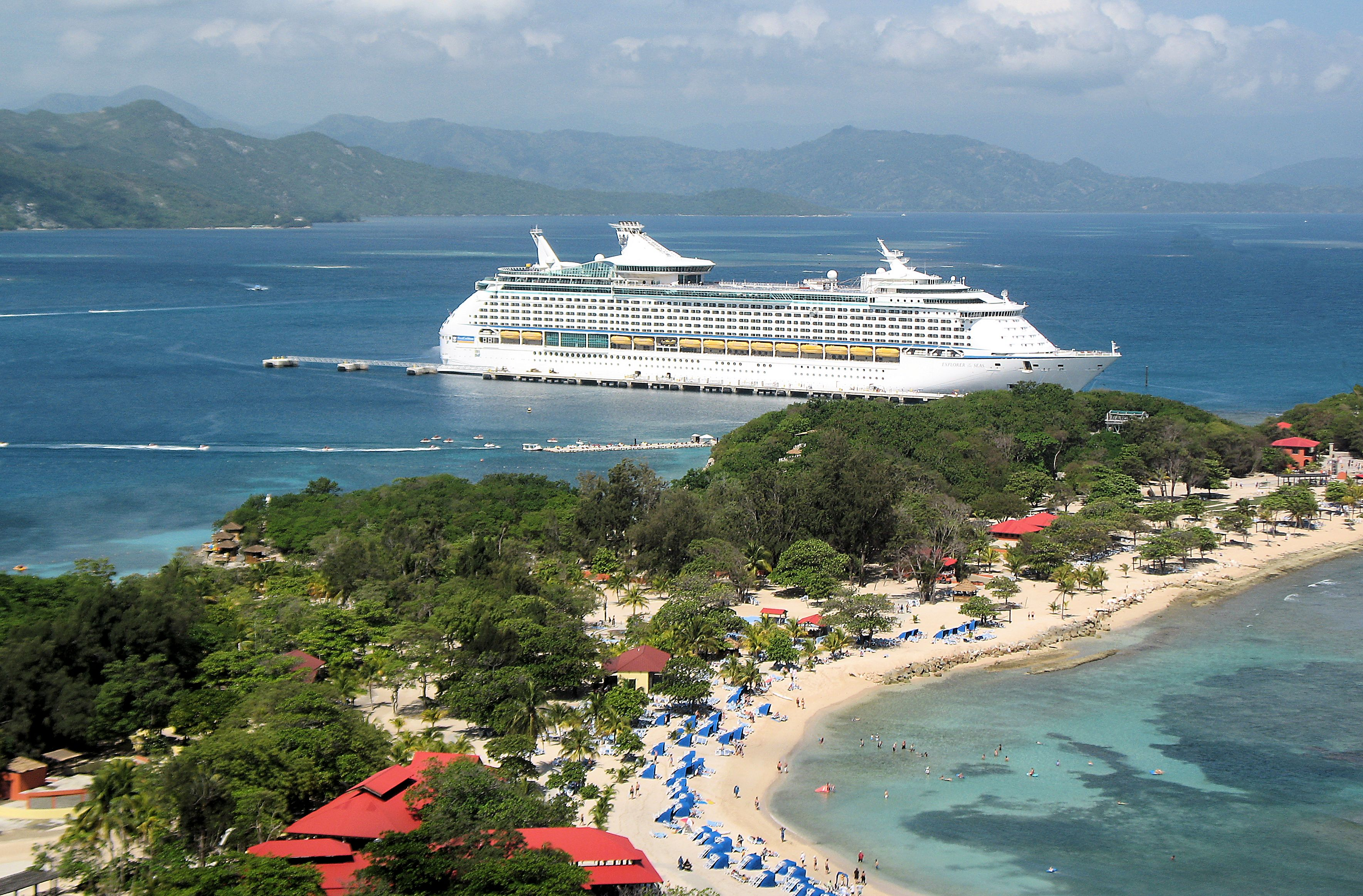
Cruise in the North Department

The Haitians manage to get the complete abolition of slavery with Toussaint's fight, Polverel, and Sonthonax, although many whites and some mulattoes were not satisfied with the outcome. Some blacks were also not satisfied since Toussaint establish strict discipline to cultivate the land and he also reinvite some whites to come back to St-Domingue.

When the expedition arrived in Haiti and Leclerc asked Christophe for a safe harbor for his military vessels and control over Cap-Haitien. After he refuses, in response he burns his own house, then burns the city and runs to the Cap mountains.

After Toussaint's capture, Dessalines and Pétion had a meeting in Plaisance to form the Indigènes Army and the collective focus shifted from liberty and abolition of slavery to Independence.

The Battle of Vertières fought on November 18, 1803, outside the city of Le Cap, was the final battle of the Haitian war of independence. Forces led by Jean-Jacques Dessalines, together with Capois, Henrí Christophe, Gabart, and other commanders, defeated the French, and Haiti declared its independence on January 1, 1804.

=== Haitian period ===
Henri Christophe, the commander of Dondon and Clerveaux commander of Marmelade are signatories of the Haitian Declaration of Independence. The Bataille of Vertières is the last major fight opposing the Armée Indigènes and the French troops and the city was freed on November 19, 1803.

During the First Empire, the North was part of the Great Division of the North under the control of Henry, Clerveaux, and Cappoix.

==== Kingdom of Hayti ====
In 1807, after the battle of Sibert, the north declared itself a free state, and later a monarchy and civil war broke out in the north under the leadership of Henri Christophe. Christophe declared the northern dominion a kingdom in 1811 and crowned himself King Henry I of Haiti.

Under the reign of His Majesty Henry 1st of Hayti, the North knew great development in architecture, culture, music, theater legislature, and science. The Kingsmen, Royal Dahomey saw to the application of Code Henry.

In 1820, King Henry committed suicide after suffering a stroke that resulted in the loss of control of his army and power. The area was re-claimed by Jean-Pierre Boyer, then the appointed president of Haiti, on October 26, 1820, after Haitian forces captured Cap-Haïtien, re-uniting Haiti.

Nonetheless, Henry Christophe, who fought in Savanah, conspired for a free and independent Haiti, and ruled for nearly 15 years is an important personality in the Haitian History.

== Geography ==
The department is bordered to the north by the Atlantic Ocean, to the west by the N-O, the South by the Artibonite, and to the east by the N-E. Topographically, its territory is separated between the Plain of the North or Caracol Plain from Limbé to Samana and the Massif of the North or the Cordillera Septentrional. The biggest rivers are the Northern River or Rivière-du-Nord. The Mapou river goes through the city of Le Cap. The biggest bays are the bay of Cap harboring multiple cays and Acul harboring Amiga island.

== Environment ==
There are mangrove forests on the east side of the bay and along the Mapou river. The National History Park - Citadelle, San-Souci, Ramiers is a UNESCO World Heritage Site.

== Economy ==
This is the richest department outside of the West.

=== Tourism ===
There are multiple major investments in tourism in the department with the biggest one being the Labadie Cruise Port with the Royal Caribbean Cruise line. The Cormier beaches are some of the most revered beaches in the North. This department has the potential to be the hub of historical tourism in the Caribbean.

=== Mining ===
Since the Taino period, inhabitants of the island have been harvesting gold artisanally. Up until today, many Haitian families continue to harvest small quantities of gold. Although the presence of gold has been confirmed multiple times, due to a lack of legislature and suspicion of the multinational no contract has been signed between the Haitian government and any other party.

=== Cuisine ===
The north is known for their cacao production, Rhum production in Pignon, and djondjon amongst others. A typical dish from the North is a meat stew with cashew nuts.

=== Architecture ===
The North has a distinct architecture from the rest of the country with the most brilliant tradition being the Haitian-Royalist-Architecture as seen in Milot, and the Haitian twist on colonial architecture. The department is witness to multiple military architectures, with the biggest fortress in the Western Hemisphere, The Citadelle Henry being the jewel on the crown.

=== Music ===
Some of Haiti's most notorious musicians are from the North, such as

- Orchestre Septentrional
- Tropicana
- Ritchie
- Arly Larivière
- Troubleboy
- G-Lex

=== Art & literature ===
Le Baron the Vastey is probably the first Haitian indigenous writer with a classic such as The Colonial System Decomposed. Philomé Obin is one of Haiti's most renowned painters.

=== Monuments ===
- The Sansousi Palace
- The Citadelle Henry
- The Royal Chapel of Milot, a religious establishment located in the Sans Souci Palace in Haiti.
- Anténor Firmin's house

== Transport ==
The RN1 connects the North to the West through Latibonit. The RN3 connects the North and the West through the centre. The RN6 connects the North and the Northeast until the Haitian-Dominican Border.

The city of Cap is the only commercial port of the North, with Labadie being a touristic port.

The department has an international airport, Hugo-Chavez connecting the North to Florida and the Dominican Republic.

== Administrative divisions ==
The Department of Nord is subdivided into seven arrondissements, which are further subdivided into nineteen communes.

- Acul-du-Nord Arrondissement
  - Acul-du-Nord
  - Milot
  - Plaine-du-Nord
- Borgne Arrondissement
  - Borgne
  - Port-Margot
- Cap-Haïtien Arrondissement
  - Cap-Haïtien
  - Limonade
  - Quartier-Morin
  - Labadee
- Grand-Rivière-du-Nord Arrondissement
  - Grande-Rivière-du-Nord
  - Bahon
- Limbé Arrondissement
  - Limbé
  - Bas-Limbé
- Plaisance Arrondissement
  - Plaisance
  - Pilate
- Saint-Raphaël Arrondissement
  - Saint-Raphaël
  - Dondon
  - La Victoire
  - Pignon
  - Ranquitte
