= Arrondissements of Haiti =

An arrondissement (pronounced [aʁɔ̃dismɑ̃]; Haitian Creole: awondisman) is a level of administrative division in Haiti.

As of 2015, the 10 departments of Haiti were divided into 42 arrondissements.

Arrondissements are further divided into communes and communal sections.

The term arrondissement can be roughly translated into English as district. A more etymologically precise, but less allegorical, definition would be encirclements, from the French arrondir, to encircle. Because no single translation adequately conveys the layered sense of the word, the French term is usually used in English writing.

The Arrondissements are listed below, by department:

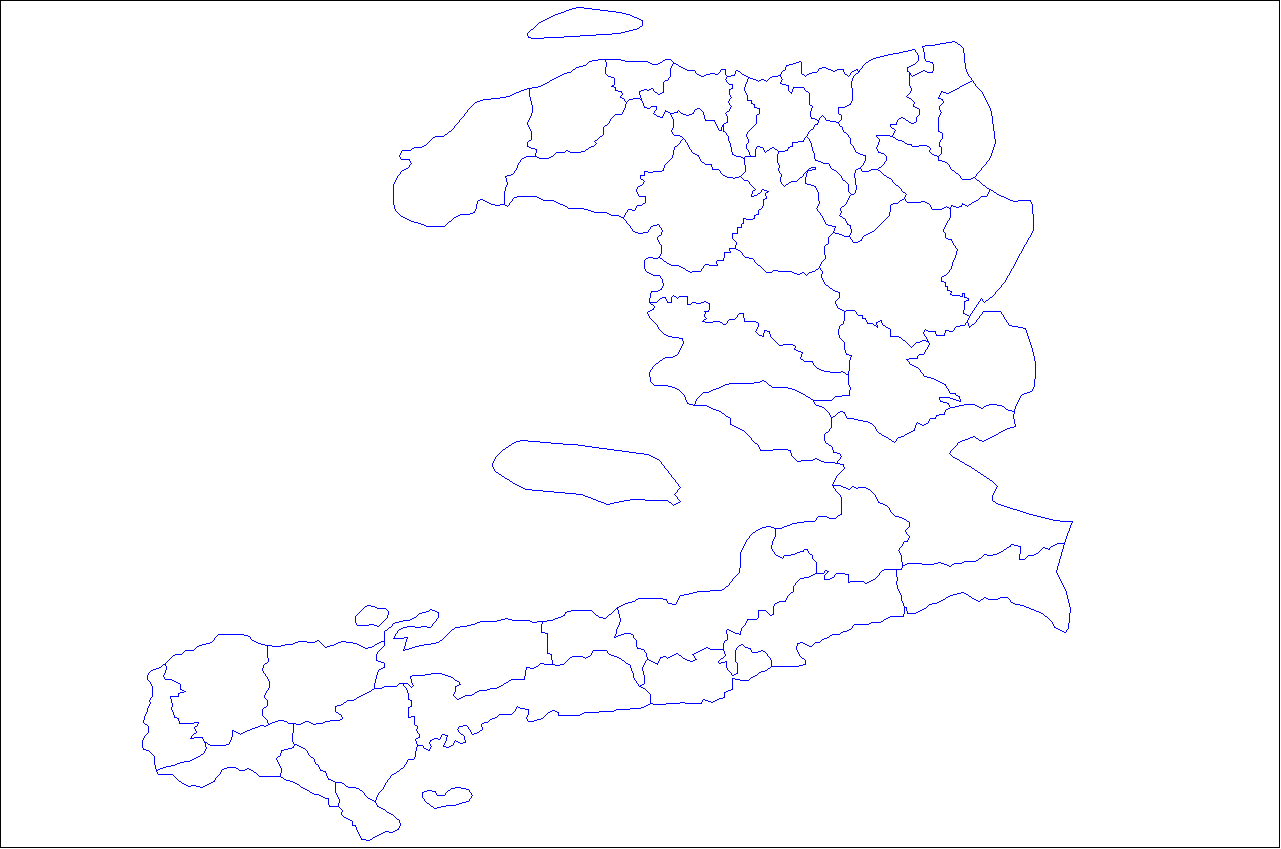
Arrondissements of Haiti

== List ==
| Department | Arrondissement | Name in Haitian Creole | Area (in km^{2}) | Population (2015) |
|---|---|---|---|---|
| Artibonite | Dessalines | Desalin | 1,132.46 | 375,499 |
| Artibonite | Gonaïves | Gonayiv | 966.71 | 263,858 |
| Artibonite | Gros-Morne | Gwo Mòn | 1,008.21 | 209,471 |
| Artibonite | Marmelade | Mamlad | 722.68 | 120,193 |
| Artibonite | Saint-Marc | Sen Mak | 1,056.88 | 268,499 |
| Centre | Cerca-la-Source | Sèka Lasous | 607.01 | 119,756 |
| Centre | Hinche | Ench | 1,393.33 | 264,963 |
| Centre | Lascahobas | Laskawobas | 623.16 | 168,685 |
| Centre | Mirebalais | Mibalè | 863.91 | 192,852 |
| Grand'Anse | Anse d'Hainault | Ansdeno | 326.52 | 98,522 |
| Grand'Anse | Corail | Koray | 767.43 | 131,561 |
| Grand'Anse | Jérémie | Jeremi | 818.02 | 238,218 |
| Nippes | Anse-à-Veau | Ansavo | 595.50 | 153,639 |
| Nippes | Baradères | Baradè | 237.20 | 47,060 |
| Nippes | Miragoâne | Miragwàn | 435.07 | 141,826 |
| Nord | Acul-du-Nord | Lakil dinò | 358.70 | 129,155 |
| Nord | Borgne | Obòy | 327.28 | 116,800 |
| Nord | Cap-Haïtien | Kap Ayisyen | 245.76 | 356,908 |
| Nord | Grande-Rivière-du-Nord | Grann Rivyè dinò | 204.53 | 64,613 |
| Nord | Limbé | Lenbe | 178.74 | 106,201 |
| Nord | Plaisance | Plezans | 242.32 | 123,633 |
| Nord | Saint-Raphaël | Sen Rafayèl | 557.58 | 169,867 |
| Nord-Est | Fort-Liberté | Fòlibète | 349.92 | 60,632 |
| Nord-Est | Ouanaminthe | Wanament | 362.24 | 146,484 |
| Nord-Est | Trou-du-Nord | Twou dinò | 504.83 | 115,000 |
| Nord-Est | Vallières | Valyè | 405.94 | 71,581 |
| Nord-Ouest | Môle-Saint-Nicolas | Mòl Sen Nikola | 1,115.43 | 245,590 |
| Nord-Ouest | Port-de-Paix | Podpè | 799.71 | 336,650 |
| Nord-Ouest | Saint-Louis-du-Nord | Sen Lwi dinò | 187.74 | 146,567 |
| Ouest | Arcahaie | Lakayè | 611.09 | 198,551 |
| Ouest | Croix-des-Bouquets | Kwadèbouke | 1,930.17 | 474,806 |
| Ouest | Gonâve | Gonav | 689.62 | 87,077 |
| Ouest | Léogâne | Leyogàn | 1,015.90 | 509,280 |
| Ouest | Port-au-Prince | Pòtoprens | 735.78 | 2,759,991 |
| Sud | Aquin | Aken | 1,039.27 | 217,827 |
| Sud | Chardonnières | Chadonyè | 382.29 | 78,410 |
| Sud | Côteaux | Koto | 181.18 | 58,618 |
| Sud | Les Cayes | Okay | 873.49 | 346,276 |
| Sud | Port-Salut | Pòsali | 177.37 | 73,845 |
| Sud-Est | Bainet | Benè | 462.63 | 135,792 |
| Sud-Est | Belle-Anse | Bèlans | 776.70 | 158,081 |
| Sud-Est | Jacmel | Jakmèl | 794.77 | 338,728 |

== See also ==
- Haiti
- Departments of Haiti
- Communes of Haiti
