= Communal section =

Administrative division in Haiti

The communal section (French: section communale, formerly section rurale) is the smallest administrative division in Haiti. The 144 communes are further divided into 571 communal sections.

== Operation ==
It is headed by an executive body, the CASEC (Board of Communal Section) and a deliberative body, ASEC (Assembly of the Communal Section).

These two institutions are aided by CDSC (the Development Council of the Communal Section).

Within each, there are cities or neighborhoods, communities, habitations, and lakou with sometimes difficult to grasp distinctions.

== List of communal sections of Haiti ==
=== Artibonite Department ===
==== Dessalines Arrondissement ====
===== Desdunes =====
- Desdunes

===== Dessalines =====
- Villard
- Fosse Naboth ou Duvallon
- Ogé
- Poste Pierrot
- Fiéfé ou Petit Cahos
- ll Croix ou Grand Cahos

===== Grande-Saline =====
- Poteneau

===== Petite Rivière de l'Artibonite =====
- Bas Coursin I
- Bas Coursin II
- Labady
- Savane à Roche
- Pérodin
- Médor

==== Gonaïves Arrondissement ====
===== Ennery =====
- Savane Carrée
- Passe-Reine ou Bas d'Ennery
- Chemin Neuf
- Puilboreau

===== L'Estère =====
- La Croix-Perisse
- Petite-Desdunes

===== Gonaïves =====
- Pont Tamarin
- Bassin
- Rivière de Bayonnais
- Poteaux
- Labranle

==== Gros-Morne Arrondissement ====
===== Anse-Rouge =====
- L'Arbre
- Sources Chaudes, Anse-Rouge

===== Gros-Morne =====
- Boucan Richard
- Rivière Mancelle
- Rivière Blanche
- L'Acul
- Pendu
- Savane Carrée
- Moulin
- Ravine Gros Morne

===== Terre-Neuve =====
- Doland
- Bois Neuf
- Lagon

==== Marmelade Arrondissement ====
===== Marmelade =====
- Crête à Pins
- Bassin ou Billier
- Platon

===== Saint-Michel-de-l'Attalaye =====
- Platana
- Camathe
- Bas de Sault
- Lalomas
- L'Ermite
- Lacedras
- Marmont
- L'Attalaye

==== Saint-Marc Arrondissement ====
===== La Chapelle =====
- Martineau
- Bossous

===== Saint-Marc =====
- Bois Neuf
- Goyavier
- Lalouère
- Bocozelle
- Charrette

===== Verrettes =====
- Belanger
- Guillaume
- Désarmes
- Bastien
- Terre Natte

===== Montrouis =====
- Délugé

===== Liancourt =====
- Liancourt

=== Centre Department ===
==== Cerca la Source Arrondissement ====
===== Cerca-la-Source =====
- Acajou Brûlé
- Lamielle

===== Thomassique =====
- Matelgate
- Lociane

==== Hinche Arrondissement ====
===== Cerca-Carvajal =====
- Rang

===== Hinche =====
- Juanaria
- Marmont
- Aguahédionde (Rive Droite)
- Aguahédionde (Rive Gauche)

===== Maïssade =====
- Savane Grande
- Narang
- Hatty

===== Thomonde =====
- Cabral
- Tierra Muscady
- Baille Tourrible
- La Hoye

==== Lascahobas Arrondissement ====
===== Belladère =====
- Roye-Sec
- Riaribes

===== Lascahobas =====
- Petit Fond
- Juampas

===== Savanette =====
- Savanette (Colombier)
- La Haye

===== Baptiste =====
- Renthe Mathe

==== Mirebalais Arrondissement ====
===== Boucan-Carré =====
- Petite Montagne
- Boucan Carré
- Bayes

===== Mirebalais =====
- Gascogne
- Sarazin
- Grand-Boucan
- Crête Brûlée

===== Saut-d'Eau =====
- Canot ou Rivière Canot
- La Selle
- Coupe Mardi Gras
- Montagne Terrible

=== Grand'Anse Department ===
==== Anse d'Hainault Arrondissement ====
===== Anse-d'Hainault =====
- Grandoit
- Boudon
- Ilet à Pierre Joseph
- Mandou

===== Dame-Marie =====
- Bariadelle
- Dallier
- Desormeau
- Petite Rivière
- Baliverne

===== Les Irois =====
- Matador (Jorgue)

==== Corail Arrondissement ====
===== Beaumont, HaitiBeaumont =====
- Beaumont
- Chardonnette
- Mouline

===== Corail =====
- Duquillon
- Fond d'Icaque
- Champy (Nan Campêche)
- Rimbeau

===== Pestel =====
- Bernagousse
- Espère
- Jean Bellune
- Tozia
- Duchity
- Les Cayemites

===== Roseaux =====
- Carrefour Charles ou Jacqui
- Fond Cochon ou Lopineau
- Grand Vincent
- Les Gommiers

==== Jérémie Arrondissement ====
===== Abricots =====
- Anse du Clerc
- Balisiers
- Danglise
- La Seringue

===== Bonbon =====
- Desormeau ou Bonbon

===== Chambellan =====
- Dejean
- Boucan

===== Jérémie =====
- Basse Voldrogue
- Haute Guinaudée
- Basse Guinaudée
- Fond Rouge Dahere
- Fond Rouge Torbeck
- Haute Voldrogue?

===== Moron =====
- Anote ou 1ère Tapion
- Sources Chaudes
- L'Assise ou Chameau

===== Marfranc =====
- Ravine à Charles
- Iles Blanches
- Marfranc ou Grande Rivière

=== Nippes Department ===
==== Anse-à-Veau Arrondissement ====
===== Anse-à-Veau =====
- Baconnois-Grand-Fond
- Grande-Rivière-Joly
- Saut du Baril

===== Petit-Trou-de-Nippes =====
- Raymond
- Tiby
- Liève ou Vigny

===== L'Asile =====
- L'Asile ou Nan Paul
- Changeux (Quartier de Changeux)
- Tournade (Quartier de Changeux)
- Morrisseau

===== Arnaud =====
- Baconnois-Barreau
- Baquet
- Morcou

===== Plaisance-du-Sud =====
- Plaisance du Sud (ou Ti François)
- Anse-aux-Pins
- Vassal Labiche

==== Baradères Arrondissement ====
===== Baradères =====
- Gérin ou Mouton
- Tête d'Eau
- Fond Tortue
- La Plaine
- Rivière Salée

===== Grand-Boucan =====
- Grand-Boucan
- Eaux Basses

==== Miragoâne Arrondissement ====
===== Miragoâne =====
- Chalon
- Belle-Rivière
- Dessources
- Saint-Michel-du-Sud

===== Petite-Rivière-de-Nippes =====
- Fond des Lianes
- Cholette
- Silègue
- Bezin

===== Fonds-des-Nègres =====
- Bouzi
- Fond-des-Nègres ou Morne Brice
- Pemerle
- Cocoyers-Ducheine

===== Paillant =====
- Salagnac
- Bezin II

=== Nord Department ===
==== Acul-du-Nord Arrondissement ====
===== Acul-du-Nord =====
- Camp Louise
- Bas de l'Acul (Basse Plaine)
- Mornet
- Grande Ravine
- Coupe à David
- Soufrière (Acul-du-Nord)

===== Milot =====
- Perches de Bonnet
- Bonnet à l'Evèque
- Genipailler

===== Plaine-du-Nord =====
- Morne Rouge
- Basse Plaine
- Grand Boucan
- Bassin Diamant

==== Borgne Arrondissement ====
===== Borgne =====
- Margot
- Boucan Michel
- Petit-Bourg-de-Borgne
- Trou d'Enfer
- Champagne
- Molas
- Côte-de-Fer et Fond

===== Port-Margot =====
- Grande Plaine
- Bas Petit Borgne
- Corail
- Haut Petit Borgne
- Bras Gauche

==== Cap-Haïtien Arrondissement ====
===== Cap-Haïtien =====
- Bande-du-Nord
- Haut-du-Cap
- Petit-Anse

===== Limonade =====
- Basse Plaine
- Bois de Lance
- Roucou

===== Quartier-Morin =====
- Basse Plaine
- Morne Pelé
- Bois-Gradis

==== Grande-Rivière-du-Nord Arrondissement ====
===== Bahon =====
- Bois Pin
- Bailly ou Bailla
- Montagne Noire

===== Grande-Rivière-du-Nord =====
- Grand Gilles
- Solon
- Caracol
- Gambade
- Joli Trou
- Cormiers

==== Limbé Arrondissement ====
===== Bas-Limbé =====
- Garde Champètre (Bas Limbé)
- Petit Howars (la Fange)
- Petit Howars (la Fange)

===== Limbé =====
- Haut Limbé ou Acul Jeanot
- Chabotte
- Camp-Coq
- Soufrière (Limbé)
- Ravine Desroches
- Ilot-à-Corne

==== Plaisance Arrondissement ====
===== Pilate =====
- Ballon
- Baudin
- Ravine-Trompette
- Joly
- Dubourg
- Piment
- Rivière Laporte
- Margot

===== Plaisance =====
- Gobert ou Colline Gobert
- Champagne
- Haut Martineau
- Mapou
- La Trouble
- La Ville
- Bassin
- Grande Rivière

==== Saint-Raphaël Arrondissement ====
===== Dondon =====
- Brostage
- Bassin Caïman
- Matador
- Laguille
- Haut du Trou

===== La Victoire =====
- La Victoire

===== Pignon =====
- Savannette
- La Belle Mère

===== Ranquitte =====
- Bac à Soude
- Bois de Lance
- Cracaraille

===== Saint-Raphaël =====
- Bois Neuf
- Mathurin
- Bouyaha
- San-Yago

=== Nord-Est Department ===
==== Fort-Liberté Arrondissement ====
===== Fort-Liberté =====
- Dumas
- Bayaha
- Loiseau
- Madeleine

===== Perches =====
- Haut des Perches
- Bas des Perches

===== Ferrier =====
- Bas Maribahoux

==== Ouanaminthe Arrondissement ====
===== Capotille =====
- Capotille
- Lamine

===== Mont-Organisé =====
- Savanette
- Bois Poux

===== Ouanaminthe =====
- Haut Maribahoux
- Acul des Pins
- Savane Longue
- Savane au Lait
- Gens de Nantes

==== Trou-du-Nord Arrondissement ====
===== Caracol =====
- Champin
- Glaudine ou "Jacquesil"

===== Sainte-Suzanne =====
- Foulon
- Bois Blanc
- Cotelette
- Sarazin
- Moka Neuf
- Fond Bleu

===== Terrier-Rouge =====
- Fond Blanc
- Grand Bassin

===== Trou-du-Nord =====
- Garcin
- Roucou
- Roche Plate

==== Vallières Arrondissement ====
===== Carice =====
- Bois Camelle
- Rose Bonite

===== Mombin-Crochu =====
- Sans Souci
- Bois-Laurence

===== Vallières =====
- Palmistes
- Ecrevisse ou Grosse Roche
- Corosse

=== Nord-Ouest Department ===
==== Môle-Saint-Nicolas Arrondissement ====
===== Baie-de-Henne =====
- Citerne Rémy
- Dos d'Ane
- Réserve ou Ti Paradis
- L'Estère Dere

===== Bombardopolis =====
- Plate Forme
- Forges
- Plaine d'Orange

===== Jean-Rabel =====
- Lacoma
- Guinaudée
- Vieille Hatte
- La Montagne
- Dessources
- Grande Source
- Diondion

===== Môle-Saint-Nicolas =====
- Côtes-de-Fer
- Mare-Rouge
- Damé

==== Port-de-Paix Arrondissement ====
===== Bassin-Bleu =====
- La Plate
- Carreau Datty
- Haut des Moustiques

===== Chansolme =====
- Chansolme
- Beauvoi

===== Île de la Tortue =====
- Pointe des Oiseaux
- Mare Rouge

===== Port-de-Paix =====
- Baudin
- Lapointe
- Aubert
- Mahotière
- Bas des Moustiques
- La Corne

==== Saint-Louis-du-Nord Arrondissement ====
===== Anse-à-Foleur =====
- Bas de Sainte Anne
- Mayance
- Côtes de Fer

===== Saint-Louis-du-Nord =====
- Rivière des Nègres
- Derourvay
- Granges
- Rivière de Barre
- Bonneau
- Lafague (Chamoise)

=== Ouest Department ===
==== Arcahaie Arrondissement ====
===== Arcahaie =====
- Boucassin
- Fonds Baptiste
- Vases
- Montrouis
- Délice
- Matheux

===== Cabaret =====
- Boucassin
- Source Matelas
- Fonds des Blancs (Casale)

==== Croix-des-Bouquets Arrondissement ====
===== Cornillon =====
- Plaine Céleste
- Bois Pin
- Génipailler

===== Croix-des-Bouquets =====
- Varreux
- Petit Bois
- Belle Fontaine
- Crochus
- Orangers

===== Fonds-Verrettes =====
- Fonds-Verrettes

===== Ganthier =====
- Galette Chambon
- Balan
- Fond Parisien
- Mare Roseaux
- Pays Pourri

===== Thomazeau =====
- Grande Plaine
- Trou d'Eau
- Crochus

==== Gonâve Arrondissement ====
===== Anse-à-Galets =====
- Palma
- Petite Source
- Grande Source
- Grand Lagon
- Picmy
- Petite-Anse

===== Pointe-à-Raquette =====
- La Source
- Grand Vide
- Trou Louis
- Pointe-à-Raquette
- Gros Mangle

==== Léogâne Arrondissement ====
===== Grand-Goâve =====
- Tête-à-Boeuf
- Moussambé
- Grande Colline
- Gérard

===== Léogâne =====
- Petite Rivière
- Grande Rivière
- Fond de Boudin
- Palmiste à Vin
- Orangers
- Parques
- Beauséjour
- Citronniers
- Fond d'Oie
- Gros Morne
- Cormiers
- Petit Harpon

===== Petit-Goâve =====
- Bino
- Delatre
- Trou Chouchou
- Fond Arabie
- Trou Canari
- Platons
- Palmes
- Sèche
- Fourques

==== Port-au-Prince Arrondissement ====
===== Carrefour =====
- Morne Chandelle
- Platon Dufréné
- Taïfer
- Procy
- Coupeau
- Bouvier
- Lavalle
- Berly
- Bizoton
- Thor
- Rivière Froide
- Malanga
- Corail Thor

===== Delmas =====
- St Martin

===== Gressier =====
- Morne à Bateau
- Chandelle
- Petit Boucan

===== Kenscoff =====
- Nouvelle Touraine
- Bongars
- Sourcailles
- Belle Fontaine
- Grand Fond

===== Pétion-Ville =====
- Montagne Noire
- Aux Cadets
- Etang du Jonc
- Bellevue la Montagne
- Bellevue Chardonnière

===== Tabarre =====
- Bellevue

===== Cité Soleil =====
- Varreux

===== Port-au-Prince =====
- Turgeau
- l'Hôpital
- Martissant
- Fontamara

=== Sud-Est Department ===
==== Bainet Arrondissement ====
===== Bainet =====
- Brésilienne
- Trou Mahot
- La Vallée de Bainet
- Haut Grandou
- Bas de Grandou
- Bas de Lacroix
- Bras Gauche
- Oranger
- Bas des Gris Gris

===== Côtes-de-Fer =====
- Gris Gris
- Labiche
- Bras Gauche
- Amazone
- Boucan Bélier
- Jamais Vu

==== Belle-Anse Arrondissement ====
===== Anse-à-Pitres =====
- Boucan Guillaume
- Bois d'Orme

===== Belle-Anse =====
- Bais d'Orange
- Mabriole
- Callumette
- Corail Lamothe
- Bel Air
- Pichon
- Mapou

===== Grand-Gosier =====
- Colline des Chênes ou Bodarie

===== Thiotte =====
- Thiotte
- Pot de Chambre

==== Jacmel Arrondissement ====
===== Cayes-Jacmel =====
- Normande
- Gaillard
- Haut Cap Rouge
- Fond Melon Michineau

===== Jacmel =====
- Bas Cap Rouge
- Fond Melon (Selles)
- Cochon Gras
- La Gosseline
- Marbial
- Montagne La Voute
- Grande Rivière de Jacmel
- Bas Coq Chante
- Haut Coq Chante
- La Vanneau
- La Montagne

===== La Vallée-de-Jacmel =====
- La Vallée de Jacmel ou Muzac
- La Vallée de Bainet ou Ternier
- Morne à Brûler

===== Marigot =====
- Corail Soult
- Grande Rivière Fesles
- Macary
- Fond Jean Noël
- Savane Dubois

=== Sud Department ===
==== Aquin Arrondissement ====
===== Aquin =====
- Macéan
- Bellevue
- Brodequin
- Flamands
- Mare à Coiffe
- La Colline
- Frangipane
- Colline à Mongons
- Fond-des-Blancs
- Section Guirand

===== Cavaellon =====
- Boileau
- Martineau
- Gros Marin
- Mare Henri
- Laroque

===== Saint-Louis-du-Sud =====
- Grand Fonds
- Baie Dumesle
- Grenodière
- Zanglais
- Sucrerie Henri
- Solon
- Cherette
- Corail-Henri

==== Chardonnières Arrondissement ====
===== Les Anglais =====
- Verone
- Edelin
- Cosse

===== Chardonnières =====
- Randal
- Dejoie
- Bony

===== Tiburon =====
- Blactote
- Nan Sevre
- Loby
- Dalmette

==== Côteaux Arrondissement ====
===== Côteaux =====
- Condé
- Despas
- Quentin

===== Port-à-Piment =====
- Paricot
- Balais

===== Roche-à-Bateaux =====
- Beaulieu
- Renaudin
- Beauclos

==== Les Cayes Arrondissement ====
===== Camp-Perrin =====
- Mersan
- Champlois
- Tibi Davezac

===== Les Cayes =====
- Bourdet
- Fonfrède
- Laborde
- Laurent
- Mercy
- Boulmier

===== Chantal =====
- Fonds Palmiste
- Melonière
- Carrefour Canon

===== Île-à-Vache =====
- Île-à-Vache

===== Maniche =====
- Maniche
- Dory
- Melon

===== Torbeck =====
- Boury
- Bérault
- Solon
- Moreau

==== Port-Salut Arrondissement ====
===== Arniquet =====
- Lazarre
- Anse à Drick
- Arniquet

===== Port-Salut =====
- Barbois
- Dumont

===== Saint-Jean-du-Sud =====
- Tapion
- Débouchette
- Trichet

== See also ==
- Haiti
- Departments of Haiti
- Arrondissements of Haiti
- List of communes of Haiti
