= Mercy (disambiguation) =

Mercy is leniency or compassion. In sport, the mercy rule may be applied.

Mercy may also refer to:

== Places ==
- Mercy Bay, Northwest Territories, Canada
- Mercy, Allier, Allier department, France, a commune
- Mercy, Yonne, Yonne department, France, a commune
- Mercy, Les Cayes, Haiti, a village in the Les Cayes municipality

== Arts and entertainment ==
=== Fictional characters ===
- Mercy (comics), a villain at the Marvel Comics universe
- Mercy, a character in the 1979 film The Warriors
- Mercy, a character in the 2019 horror comic series Witch Creek Road
- Mercy Bromage, a character from the 2017 movie My Days of Mercy
- Mercy Chant, a minor character in the Thomas Hardy novel Tess of the d'Urbervilles
- Mercy Graves, a character from Superman: The Animated Series
- Mercy Hartigan, the human accomplice of the Cybermen in The Next Doctor
- Mercy Olubunmi, in the British soap opera EastEnders and Internet spin-off EastEnders: E20
- Mercy Thompson, in an urban fantasy series written by Patricia Briggs
- Mercy (Overwatch), from the 2016 video game Overwatch
- Mercy Watson, the main character from the Mercy Watson series

=== Fictional places ===
- Mercy, Saskatchewan, the setting for the Canadian sitcom Little Mosque on the Prairie

=== Film ===
- Mercy (1953 film), a Mexican drama directed by Zacarías Gómez Urquiza
- Mercy (1995 film), a crime film starring Sam Rockwell and John Rubinstein
- Mercy (2000 film), a crime film starring Ellen Barkin and Julian Sands
- Mercy (2009 film), a romantic drama about a writer who pursues a romance with a critic
- Mercy (2012 film), a German drama film about a couple and their teenage son who emigrate to the north of Norway
- Mercy (2014 film), an American horror film that loosely adapts the Stephen King short story "Gramma"
- Mercy (2016 film), a home invasion thriller distributed on Netflix
- The Mercy, a 2017 British biographical drama film about an amateur yacht sailor in the Sunday Times Golden Globe Race
- Mercy (2023 film), an American action film starring Leah Gibson, Jonathan Rhys Meyers, and Jon Voight
- Mercy (2025 film), an Indian drama film starring Adil Hussain
- Mercy (2026 film), an American science fiction film starring Chris Pratt and Rebecca Ferguson

=== Games ===
- Mercy (game), a children's game that involves the bending back of an opponent's hands
- Mercy, a move related to the Fatality in the video game series Mortal Kombat

=== Literature ===
- Mercy (Vertigo), a graphic novel in DC Comics' Vertigo imprint
- A Mercy, a 2008 novel by Toni Morrison
- Mercy (novel), a 1996 novel by Jodi Picoult
- Mercy, a 1991 book by Andrea Dworkin
- Mercy, a 2019 storyline of the horror comic Witch Creek Road season 2 by Garth Matthams and Kenan Halilović

=== Music ===
- Mercy (band), a 1960s pop group

==== Albums ====
- Mercy, by Andraé Crouch, 1994
- Mercy (Armand Hammer and the Alchemist album), 2025
- Mercy (Burden Brothers album), 2006
- Mercy, by Bryan Duncan, 1992
- Mercy (John Cale album), 2023
- Mercy (Meredith Monk album), 2002
- Mercy, by Natalie Bergman, 2021
- Mercy (Planes Mistaken for Stars album), 2006
- Mercy (Remo Drive album), 2024
- Mercy (Rocco DeLuca and the Burden album), 2009
- Mercy (Salmonella Dub remix album), 2004
- Mercy (Steve Jones album), 1987
- Mercy (Trey Anastasio album), 2022

==== Songs ====
- "Mercy" (Ayron Jones song), 2021
- "Mercy", by The Blessed Madonna & Jacob Lusk, 2023
- "Mercy" (Brett Young song), 2018
- "Mercy" (Dave Matthews Band song), 2012
- "Mercy" (Duffy song), 2008
- "Mercy" (Elevation Worship and Maverick City Music song), 2021
- "Mercy" (Kanye West song), 2012
- "Mercy" (Madame Monsieur song), 2018
- "Mercy", by Monsta X from No Limit, 2021
- "Mercy" (Muse song), 2015
- "Mercy", by OneRepublic from Dreaming Out Loud, 2007
- Mercy (President song), 2026
- "Mercy" (Shawn Mendes song), 2016
- "Mercy", by Wire from Chairs Missing, 1978

=== Television ===
- Mercy (TV series), an American medical drama
- "Mercy" (The Walking Dead), an episode

== Organizations ==
- Mercy (healthcare organization), a Catholic health system in the United States sponsored by the Sisters of Mercy
- Mercy Malaysia, a Malaysia-based relief group
- Mercy Ministries, a Charity organization

== Schools ==
- Mercy College (disambiguation)
- Mercy High School (disambiguation)
- Mercy Academy, an all-girls Roman Catholic high school in Louisville, Kentucky

== People ==
- Mercy (given name), a list of people with the given name or nickname

== Other uses ==
- Mercy Hospital (disambiguation)
- USS Mercy, three United States Navy hospital ships
- Mercy-class hospital ship
- Mercy (cipher), a disk encryption algorithm
- Mercy (drink), a hangover preventative beverage
- Waylon Mercy, later stage name for former professional wrestler Dan Spivey

== See also ==
- La Mercy, a suburb of the eThekwini municipality, South Africa
- "Mercy, Mercy, Mercy", a 1966 jazz instrumental written by Joe Zawinul for Julian "Cannonball" Adderley
- "Mercy, Mercy" (Don Covay song), a 1965 soul song
- "Aw' Mercy", a song by Booker T. & the M.G.'s from the album Soul Dressing
- Mercy-le-Bas, in the Meurthe-et-Moselle department
- Mercy-le-Haut, in the Meurthe-et-Moselle department
- Val-de-Mercy, in the Yonne department
