= Diondion =

- Communal section
- Location in Haiti
- Coordinates: 19°51′08″N 73°12′52″W
- Country: Haiti
- Department: Nord-Ouest
- Arrondissement: Môle-Saint-Nicolas

Diondion is a communal section of the Jean-Rabel commune, in the Môle-Saint-Nicolas Arrondissement, in the Nord-Ouest department.
