= NAACP New Orleans Branch =

Oldest continuously active branch of the NAACP

New Orleans Branch of the National Association for the Advancement of Colored People
- Abbreviation: NAACP New Orleans Branch
- Formation: Chartered July 15, 1915
- Headquarters: Branch Office; 2475 Canal St., Ste. 308; New Orleans, Louisiana; TEL: 504-822-8512; FAX: 504-821-3131
- President: Atty. Danatus N. King Sr.
- Website: neworleansnaacp.org

The New Orleans Branch is the oldest continuously active branch of the National Association for the Advancement of Colored People south of Washington D.C. It was formally chartered on July 15, 1915. However, prior to that time, there had been organizational efforts underway to affiliate with this new national civil rights organization which had first organized in New York City in 1909. In 1911, Emanuel M. Dunn, Paul Landix Sr. and James E. Gayle wrote to the NAACP national office to obtain more information about this "new abolition movement." Apparently, the locals did not wait for formal action from the national office, but proceeded to organize without official sanction.

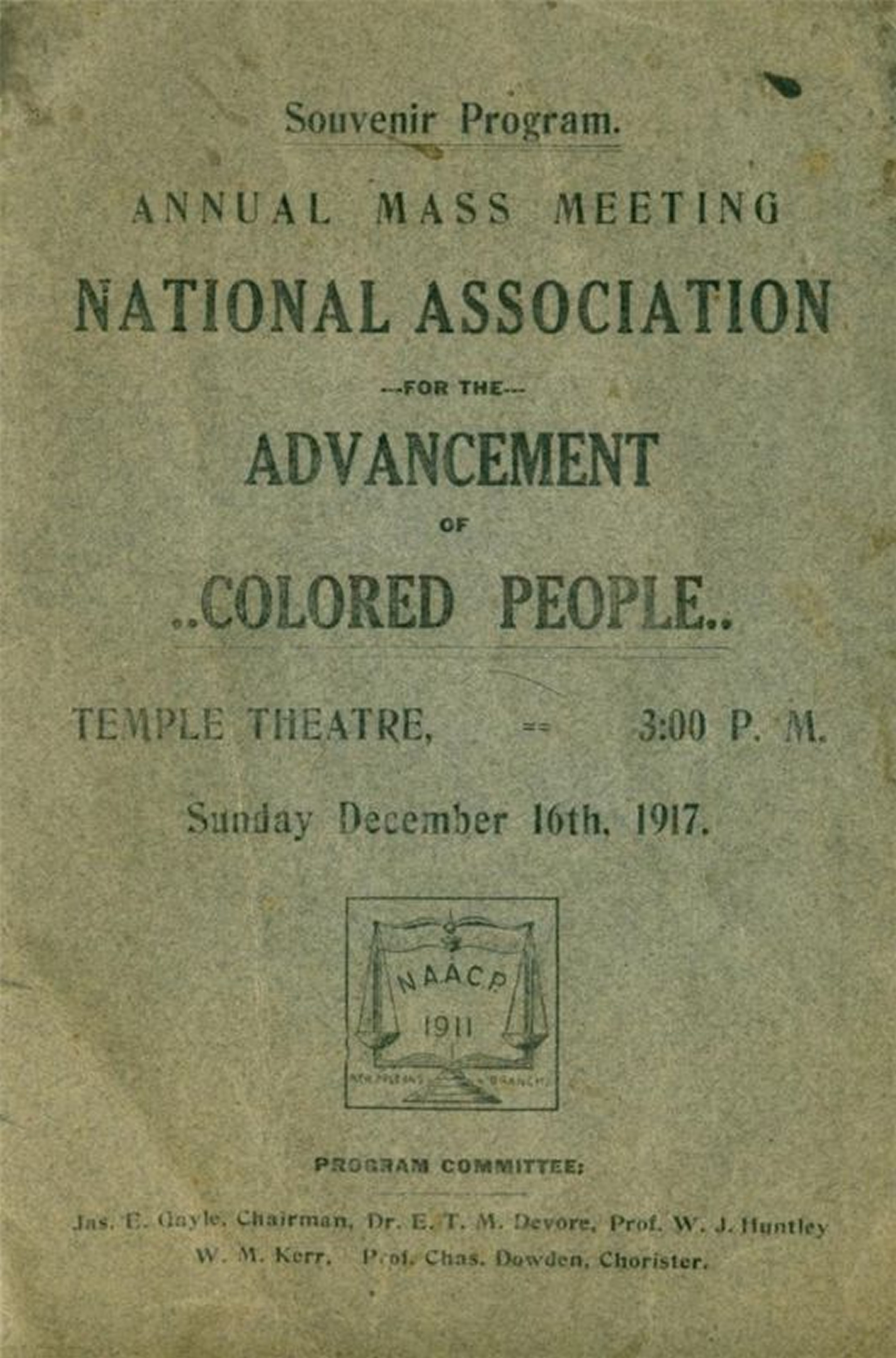
Program cover to the Annual Mass Meeting of the NAACP New Orleans Branch held at the Louisiana Knights of Pythias Temple Theater.

In any case, a surviving copy of the program for the 1917 Annual Meeting indicated that the branch had been meeting, even without official authorization, since 1911. The January 1916 issue of The Crisis reported that a Branch had been organized in New Orleans. H.C. Casa Calvo and Louis G. King were listed as founding president and secretary respectively. There were twenty founding members. It has been reported that the branch formally organized in the facilities of Tulane Avenue Baptist Church which was ministered by Rev. Eugene Walter White, who served as one of the early presidents. Tulane Avenue B.C., now Tulane Memorial B.C., met on Tulane Avenue between Claborne and Derbigny Streets. Early members of the executive committee (1917) were: Dr. E.W. White, President; L.B. Vigne, Vice President; E.M. Dunn, Secretary; N.B. Flott, Treasurer; Dr. E.T.M. Devore; Dr. E.J. Vincent; Ms. C. Richards; Charles Byrd; Dr. J.H. Thomas; Dr. W.A. Willis; B.N. Petty; Alexander Mollay; and James E. Gayle. In addition, there were several active committees which included: Membership, Finance, Press, Legal Redress, Grievance, and Education.

One of the branch's earliest actions was the presentation of a petition containing more than 5,000 signatures to Mayor Martin Behrman protesting the use of Negro women prisoners as street cleaners. The branch could do little more than protest since only a handful of Negroes were registered to vote. Most black voters had been removed from the rolls by the end of the 19th century. While there had been nearly 135,000 black voters across the state in 1896, by 1910, there were less than 1,000 black voters throughout the state. Plessey v. Ferguson which gave legal approval to racial segregation bore much bitter fruit for the future. It would take many years of bitter tears and unending toil and even innocent lives to undo the effects of this decision.

== Getting the word out ==
The Plessey decision involved racial segregation on railroad cars; but segregation followed in quick succession on street cars, theaters, sporting matches and jails and prisons. "Separate but equal" schools were mere empty words, as the city of New Orleans failed to provide a single public high school for Negroes prior to 1915. Therefore, high on the agenda for the new leaders of the branch was improved educational facilities and opportunities for black citizens. Under the leadership of the Rev. White, the branch organized a Branch newspaper, The Vindicator, to publicize its program and to appeal for financial support. The branch secretary, Emanuel Dunn served as editor and manager of the paper. In 1921, Rev. White was succeeded by one of his deacons, Dr. George W. Lucas, who made the branch into an effective voice for Negro protest. Throughout the 1920s, the branch raised funds as it raised its voice in protest against the poll tax, the white Democratic primary, segregated neighborhoods and police brutality against black citizens and the proposed closing of the Joseph Craig School. The school board ultimately reconsidered its decision.

== A.P. Tureaud ==
Alexander Pierre Tureaud was born in the old French Hospital in New Orleans in 1899, less than 35 years following the Civil War. He grew up on Kerlerec Street in the 7th Ward with 10 brothers and sisters. As a teenager, Tureaud worked in railroad yards in Chicago, and later moved to New York to live with his brother and work with his uncle, James Slater, who was involved in Republican politics. When Tureaud was 19, he became a junior clerk in the U.S. Justice Department library in Washington, D.C. Tureaud rented a room at the home of NAACP activist Shelby Davidson and wrote for the Washington Daily American newspaper. Tureaud, A. P. (1899–1972) | Amistad Research Center http://www.amistadresearchcenter.org/archon/?p=creators/creator&id=10

As the local attorney for the NAACP Legal Defense and Educational Fund, Inc., Benjamin L. Hooks, "Birth and Separation of the NAACP Legal Defense and Educational Fund", Crisis 1979 86(6): 218–220. 0011-1422 Tureaud successfully obtained equal pay for Louisiana's African American teachers and the admission of qualified students to state-supported professional, graduate and undergraduate schools. He fought to end segregation on city buses in Louisiana, and he successfully defended one of the first sit-in cases to go before the U.S. Supreme Court. Of the more than 60 cases he filed from 1944 to his death, the more notable cases included the following. In 1940, the New Orleans branch of the NAACP hired legendary attorney Thurgood Marshall to represent it in the case against the Orleans Parish School Board for equitable pay. Joseph P. McKelpin v. Orleans Parish School Board (1941) was ultimately settled out of court on September 1, 1942, and equalized teacher salaries in Louisiana. Eight years later in 1950 and 1953, he filed suit against the Louisiana State University Board of Supervisors on behalf of Roy S. Wilson (1950) and Alexander P. Tureaud Jr. which desegregated higher education institutions. The 1952 case of Earl Benjamin BushBush v. Orleans Parish School Board and the Desegregation of New Orleans Schools http://www.fjc.gov/history/home.nsf/page/tu_bush_bio_tureaud.html (son of insurance salesman Oliver Bush) v. Orleans Parish School Board led to the desegregation of public schools. Fairclough, Adam. Race & Democracy: The Civil Rights Struggle in Louisiana, 1915-1972. In 1959, Federal Judge J.S. Wright ordered the Orleans Parish School Board to integrate its schools;Baker, Liva. The Second Battle of New Orleans: The Hundred-Year Struggle to Integrate the Schools. Gail Etienne, Leona Tate, Ruby Bridges, and Tessie Prevost were selected to fulfill the court's mandate. On November 14, 1960, three of the four children entered the John McDonogh #19 Elementary School, and one student, entered at William Frantz School. A.P. Tureaud retired in 1971. A.P. Tureaud died in New Orleans at the age of 73.

Lucas extended his activities beyond the City of New Orleans and for a short time acted unofficially as state president for the NAACP. In 1925, he was elected to the national board of directors, where he served until his death in 1931. During the 1920s, the NAACP was joined in its crusade by a new newspaper The Louisiana Weekly, published by Constant C. Dejoie Sr. This newspaper, with many contacts across the state, helped to facilitate the work of the NAACP. Following the death of Dr. Lucas, Dunn, George Labat assumed the leadership of the branch. The high unemployment rate that was especially for Negroes, made it difficult for the association to hold most of its members.

== Challenging the status quo ==
The branch was besieged with complaints of racial discrimination in housing, employment, and hospital care and police brutality. On one occasion the branch president, Dr. A.W. Brazier, was arrested for investigating a complaint against the police. Others who served as president during the 1930s included: Rev. E.W. White, George Labat and James E. Gayle. In 1939 a group of "young Turks" challenged the incumbent leadership for control. Political tickets were formed, parades were held and more than seven hundred members participated in the election. The challengers lost for the moment, but this new group would shortly take over the branch's leadership and would direct the affairs of the association for the next several decades.

"The Group," included Daniel and Mildred Byrd, Bennett Ross, John E. Rousseau Jr., Arthur J. Chapital Sr., Rev. Abraham Lincoln (A.L.) Davis Jr., Katie E. Wickham and Annie W. Ramie. By 1942 "the group" had gained control. Bennett Ross became the new president and the membership zoomed to more than three thousand. When Ross stepped down to enter the armed service, Byrd took over the leadership.

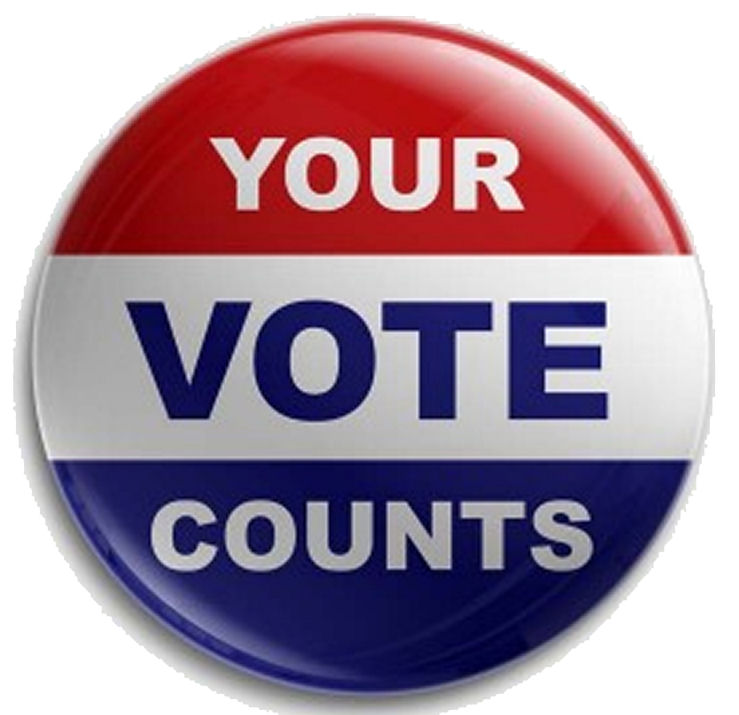
Disenfranchised citizens throughout the New Orleans area were registered to vote by the NAACP New Orleans Branch.

In early 1943, Daniel Byrd became the founding president of the Louisiana State Conference of NAACP Branches in Louisiana. He was later made its first executive secretary, a position that he had held with the New Orleans Branch. Attorney Alexander P. Tureaud, who had been actively involved in the NAACP since the 1920s, became a tireless champion for the branch and the state conference as legal counselor for both. Tureaud won 16 separate teacher salary equalization cases across the state. He was also successful in overturning the white primary within Louisiana. Later he was responsible for desegregation of public schools in 53 of the state's 64 parishes! In later years, Byrd gave technical assistance in school desegregation cases in the states of Louisiana, Mississippi, Arkansas, Texas, and Illinois. From 1967 to 1974, he served on the Louisiana Education Association-Louisiana Teacher Association Joint Committee, which negotiated the merger of the two organizations. In 1974, he served on the Louisiana Committee for the Dismantling of a Dual System of Higher Education. In 1949, Byrd stated: "We are determined to secure absolute equality and nothing less than complete equality is acceptable to our community." Byrd retired from the NAACP in 1977. Byrd died in 1984.

During the 1940s and 1950s, the branch conducted a successful selective buying campaign against major department stores which refused Negro women the same rights as white women to try on clothes before purchasing them. The branch also conducted voter education classes which helped to push Negro registration over thirty thousand by the early 1950s.

=== Continued fight for desegregation ===
In 1952, Arthur J. Chapital Sr. assumed the helm of the branch, after serving on its executive committee for a number of years. The "Chapital Years," 1952–62, could only be characterized as "turbulent," but equally successful. The branch launched an all-out assault against segregated schools, public transportation, public parks and playgrounds and public facilities. Its stepped up protest resulted in a state court order which forced it to disband temporarily. The forming of a new organization, the New Orleans Improvement Assn., which was headed by Dr. William Adams, spearheaded the desegregation of public buses and streetcars in 1958.

By the time Chapital passed on the reins of leadership to Ernest Nathan "Dutch" Morial in 1963, public school desegregation had begun as a result of the suit first filed by Tureaud in 1952. It was not without sacrifice however, as Federal Marshals had to escort Ruby Bridges, Gail Etienne, Tessie Prevost and Leona Tate to school in order to protect them from hostile mobs. In 1958, the New Orleans Branch brought action against Louisiana State University which forced the school to admit Negro students when it re-opened later that fall. Both City Park and Audubon Park were opened to Negroes as a result of NAACP lawsuits.

The New Orleans Branch organized one of the first protest against the then segregated Orleans Parish Schools in 1950. African American students were not allowed to pay tribute to John McDonogh – a 19th-century philanthropist and primary benefactor of the school system. Branch President, Arthur J. Chapital collaborated with the local teachers' association, labor leader attorney Revius Ortique Jr., and NAACP Legal Defense Fund attorney A.P. Tureaud to stage a boycott of McDonogh Day event. Over 30,000 students were kept home by local parents. In 1960, the branch reactivated its youth council, which previously had been one of the best in the country. The reactivated council was largely responsible for the hiring of Blacks in meaningful positions in more than thirty stores on Canal Street as a result of the selective buying campaign that it led from July 25, 1963 – August 12, 1965. Much of the credit goes to Raphael Cassimere Jr., Youth Council president from 1960 to 1966, and Llewelyn J. Soniat who served as Youth Advisor for a quarter-century.

Dr. Raphael Cassimere Jr. is President Emeritus of the New Orleans Youth Council and recipient of the NAACP Louisiana State Conferences' Alexander Pierre Tureaud Medal.

The effectiveness of that leadership has been recognized continually as the New Orleans Youth Council and its Advisor have been selected "number one" in the association numerous times. A number of youth council members have served on the national board of directors including: Donald J. Soniat, Joseph and Norbert Rome, Paul Stewart, Kurte Pellerin, Keith Johnson, Cyril Saulny, James Lucien and Sheila Williams. Dr. Leonard L. Burns and Dutch Morial were the adult members elected to the national board from New Orleans.

Following the Arthur Chapital years, Morial was elected to two presidential terms, but resigned early during the second term to accept appointment as an Assistant U.S. Attorney in 1965. Morial was successful in desegregating the municipal auditorium and participated with a coalition of black and white leaders in helping to desegregate city owned facilities and the hiring of blacks in city civil service positions. Atty. Ernest N. Morial was followed by pharmacist, Horace C. Bynum Sr. who had previously served as chairman of the branch's executive committee.

Bynum served from 1965 to 1968 and the scored several important victories in upgrading employment opportunities for blacks at Coca-Cola, Holsum Bakeries and the new NASA Michoud plant. Bynum was followed by Wallace L. Young (1969–70), Allison L. Chapital Sr., (1971–72), Dr. Guy G. Gipson, (1973–74), Ms. Dyan F. Cole (1975–76) and Gustave R. Thomas (1977 - March 1980).

=== Housing and employment ===
During the 1970s while the branch continued to protest against discrimination in employment, housing and public accommodations, it expanded its activities to reflect the new political realities. In 1971 the New Orleans Branch reactivated its political action committee, which came up with a redistricting plan that created seven majority black districts. This resulted in the election of 5 black state representatives. The branch also submitted to the City of New Orleans councilman redistricting plans and successfully argued for retaining the 5 district and 2 at large council seats. As a direct result of enfranchising 18-year-old citizens, there was an expansion of both voter registration-education and get out the vote efforts. Branch officers and executive committee members were selected to serve on a number of public boards and commissions including: Audubon Park Commission, Louisiana Black Culture Commission, Parkway and Park Commission, Vieux Carre Commission, Louisiana Election Code Revision Commission and both the state's and city's Human Relations Commissions.

In 1974 the branch hosted the 65th annual NAACP national convention. A record number of delegates attended and were treated to the special hospitality of the "city that care forgot." Delegates were so pleased that they returned again in 1983. Also in '74, Dan E. Byrd and Emmitt Douglas worked on a committee charged with dismantling of the duel higher education system in Louisiana. The committee recommended the merger of several colleges and universities including Louisiana State University and Agricultural and Mechanical College and Southern University and A&M College.

== Women In the New Orleans Branch NAACP ==
Later, in 1979 the branch moved from its long-time headquarters in the Claver building to a building located at 1630 Lapeyrouse Street, which was renovated and made available through the generosity of businessman Joseph O. Misshore. Shirley B. Porter assumed the presidency of the branch in March 1980 upon the resignation of Gustave Thomas, who later moved to Virginia. Ms Porter held the presidency longer than any previous occupant and during that time period had to confront old types of discrimination in new forms. The branch has been involved in protests ranging from picketing companies doing business with the apartheid policies of South Africa, to local police misconduct.

The New Orleans Branch continues to receive and act on complaints of discrimination in housing, employment and public accommodations. It has been successful in securing "fair share" agreements with Entergy Corporation and NOPSI and Louisiana Power and Light. The New Orleans Branch it spearheaded a successful "get out the vote" campaign in Uptown New Orleans to help defeat David Duke in his failed gubernatorial bid.

Past President Dyan F. Cole (1975–1976) was the first female elected Out of the Shadows: Black Women's Activism in Louisiana http://www.h-net.org/reviews/showrev.php?id=23454 to lead the NAACP New Orleans Branch. Pictured here at the funeral of Past President Dr. Horace Bynum (1965–1968).

Shirley Porter served on the New Orleans Human Relations Commission. In that capacity, she was able to get the commission to involve itself in investigating allegations of police misconduct, a problem that the branch has been involved with since its inception. The branch also played an integral part in the effort to pass and implement the city's open accommodations ordinance and the removal of the Liberty Monument so-called from public view. Shirley Porter retired after having served nearly fifteen years. On January 1, 1995, Sheila Williams, a former member of the New Orleans NAACP Youth Council, became president. Williams previously served as State Youth President and later State Youth Advisor. She is a former member of the national board of directors, and has served as a trustee of the Special Contribution Fund. She has emphasized the unique strengths of the NAACP based on its glorious, but also the need for the association to remain current and relevant. Frystak, Shannon F. Our Minds on Freedom: Women and the Struggle for Black Equality in Louisiana, 1924-1967.

The branch officers played a leading role in the "march on the mansion" to protest Governor Mike Foster precipitous rescission of an early executive order in support of affirmative action. The New Orleans Branch also conducted a voter-sign up campaign in collaboration with the local Circle-K stores. The branch receives and monitors local complaints and problems regarding discrimination from members of the community and governmental bodies. In 1995, the branch revitalized its youth council and again conducted a highly successful ACT-SO competition. More than a dozen youth were taken to the national convention in Minneapolis, Minnesota.

In a response to Gov. Mike Foster's revision of a state set aside program, Branch members joined with other NAACP units, civil rights, labor, and civic groups to form a mammoth "March on the Mansion" to protest the governor's action. The branch sponsored eight buses to Baton Rouge. Numerous other citizens arrived by private transportation. Local NAACP activists Llewelyn J. Soniat and Roy Rome Sr. joined perennial freedom fighter Rev. Avery C. Alexander, in a motorcade to the governor's home in Franklin. Branch leaders worked on a strategy to develop a new meaningful and effective set/aside program. In 1989 the branch organized a prayer breakfast and "Fair Share luncheon" as part of its anniversary and Freedom Fund weekend activities.

As the largest Branch in the state, New Orleans has consistently played a leadership role in the Louisiana State Conference of Branches, Youth Councils and College Chapters. Local members have consistently served on national bodies of the NAACP and have even been willing to work across regional, ethnic, religious boundaries to work for the common goals of human brotherhood. Following President S. Williams (1995–1996) term of office was: Cyril B. Saulny (1997 – June 2002); (Interim) Terry Holden (June 2002 – 2003) and (Administrator) Rupert F. Richardson (2003–2005. Richardson also served as the National President of the NAACP from 1992 to 1995. Sartain, Lee. Invisible Activists: Women of the Louisiana NAACP and the Struggle for Civil Rights, 1915-1945.

== The Vindicator e-newsletter and Branch Website ==
In 2005, in a highly publicized election, Attorney Danatus N. King Sr. was elected president of the NAACP New Orleans Branch. The installation of the president and the executive officers of the branch was held at the Lawless Memorial Chapel of Dillard University. The Hon. Judge Terri Love, Louisiana State Fourth Circuit Court of Appeals installed executive committee members, and the Hon. Judge Ernestine Gray installed the President. The 2005 installation was attended by the Honorable C. Ray Nagin, past national NAACP president Rupert F. Richardson, NAACP Louisiana Conference President Ernest L. Johnson and the presidents of the Dillard University and Xavier University Chapters, NAACP, along with other local and state officials. In 2005, The New Orleans Branch NAACP called for a full federal and local investigation of the death of a black college student who died in a scuffle with bouncers outside a French Quarter nightclub on New Year's Eve. The club's attorney said the club's staff acted responsibly and professionally in response to aggression.

Branch President King, then president-elect of the New Orleans Branch of the NAACP, said at a news conference that the civil rights group has asked U.S. Attorney Jim Letten and the Orleans Parish District Attorney Eddie Jordan to look into the death of Levon Jones, age 25. The New Orleans Branch also collaborated with the Southern Poverty Law Center, Puentes New Orleans – a Latino community development organization, the Vietnamese American Young Leaders Association of New Orleans, and several other community organizations to report on the systemic failures plaguing New Orleans Schools.

In 2010, King, resigned NAACP leader says NOPD chief search too secretive, resigns from committee http://www.wwltv.com/news/NAACP-leader-says-NOPD-chief-search-too-secretive-resigns-89434507.html from the New Orleans Police Department chief search committee the committee, formed by Mayor-elect Mitch Landrieu, because the names of the candidates were not being made public from the outset. Later in December 2010, the branch asked the U.S. Justice Department to keep its investigation open of a group of NOPD officers until investigators determine what happened to Mr. Henry Glover's skull. During the aftermath of Hurricanes Katrina and Rita, Glover was shot and his body was placed in a car and burned. "If they cannot find the skull," King asked the judge to make it a significant part of the sentencing process. Moore, Leonard N. Black. Rage in New Orleans: Police Brutality and African American Activism from World War II to Hurricane Katrina. "The only information we have is the knowledge that (the officers) benefited by the skull being missing," asserted President King. "The skull could have shown that Mr. Glover was shot in the head. So with it missing, who benefits?" The 2008 installation was held at Second Free Mission Baptist Church and Pastor Warren Ray Jr. gave the invocation. Hon. Justice Bernette Joshua Johnson of the Louisiana State Supreme Court installed the President.

In 2010, the branch initiated a site on the World Wide Web providing information about the branch and displaying Branch pictures and videos. The website was created by King in an effort to maintain a 21st-century presence on the Internet. Soon afterwards, a site was established on the popular social network – "Facebook." The first edition and rebirth of the branch newsletter was published in January 2011. Both the "Facebook" site and The Vindicator - the newsletter online was created for the branch by L.A. LeBan, Chairman of Communications Press & Publicity. LeBan also established an online television channel on YouTube

In 2005, in a highly publicized election, Attorney Danatus N. King Sr. was elected President of the NAACP New Orleans Branch.

In 2011, the New Orleans Branch went on record as categorically opposing the proposed merger of the University of New Orleans and Southern University at New Orleans. In February 2011, the New Orleans Branch of the NAACP joined the National NAACP Stakeholder Relations Department as one of the stops on the 10-city tour. The Let It Rise Tour was composed of three segments which included: a round-table discussion by clergy; a mass meeting/revival service; and a health awareness summit. The theme of the 2011 Tour was: "The Faith Community as an Agent for Social Justice;" which furthers the mission of the Association to ensure the political, educational, social, and economic equality of rights of all persons and to eliminate race-based discrimination.

The "Let It Rise" Tour had three components: a round table discussion by clergy; a mass meeting/revival service; and a health summit. The first two components were held at Second Free Mission Baptist Church and the health summit and fair was held at the Historic St. James A.M.E. Church. Members of the local "Let It Rise" Committee are: Danatus N. King Sr., President; Dr. Clara Wilson Cook, Health Chair; Deborah V. Chapman-Kareem, 1st Vice President; Florida C. Hargrove, 2nd Vice President and Freedom Fund Chair; Laurene McMillan, Branch Secretary; Alice Lewis, Branch Treasurer; Inez H. Cassimere, Executive Committee At-Large Member and Membership Chair; Julie Andrews, Assistant Treasurer and Education Chair; Rev. Dr. Warren J. Ray Jr., Religious Affairs Chair; and Levon A. LeBan, Chair of Communications, Press & Publicity.

NAACP Louisiana State Conference District "A" Vice President L.A. LeBan proposed that the branch host the District "A" Office. In a unanimous vote, members of the New Orleans Branch approved the proposal. The branch will now be the point of contact for the District "A" Office of the NAACP Louisiana State Conference Vice President. Later that month at the 102nd National Convention in Los Angeles, California, the NAACP New Orleans Branch received the 2011 Rupert F. Richardson Memorial Leadership Award for leadership qualities, professionalism, innovation and youth development. Later, in September, the New Orleans Branch received the Outstanding Unit Award from the NAACP Louisiana State Conference at the 69th Annual State Convention. In 2012, the branch was awarded the Thailheimer Award for Programs at the 103rd National Convention in Houston, Texas and the 2013 Thailheimer Award for Publications at the 104th Annual Convention in Orlando, Florida.

== NAACP New Orleans Branch presidents ==
H. C. Casa Calvo, founding president, 1911-1915
Rev. Eugene W. White, 1915-1921
Dr. George W. Lucas, 1921-January 1931
Rev. Emanuel M. Dunn, March 1931
George Labat, 1932-1933
Rev. Eugene W. White, 1933-1934
James E. Gayle, 1935-36
Dr. A.W. Brazier, 1937-1938
Edwin "Chummy" Wilkins, 1939-1940
Bennett Ross, 1940-1941
Daniel E. Byrd, 1942-1943
Rev. C. Charles Taylor, 1943-1944
Rev. L.L. Haynes, 1945-1946
Daniel E. Byrd, 1947-48
Robert B. Delahoussaye, 1948-1950
Arthur J. Chapital Sr., 1951-1962
Atty. Ernest N. "Dutch" Morial, 1963-1965
Dr. Horace C. Bynum, May 1965 – 1968
Wallace L. Young, 1969-1970
Allison L. Chapital Sr., 1971-1972
Dr. Guy G. Gipson, 1973-1974
Ms. Dyan French "Mama D" Cole, 1975-1976
Gustave R. Thomas, 1977-March 1980
Mrs. Shirley B. Porter, March 1980-1994
Ms. Sheila Williams, 1995-1996
Cyril B. Saulny 1997-June 2002
Terry Holden (Interim) June 2002-2003
Rupert F. Richardson (Administrator), 2003-2005
Atty. Danatus N. King Sr., 2005-2015
Judge (Ret.) Morris Reed Sr., 2015-2017
Gloria Hall Johnson, 2017
Atty. Ernest L. Johnson Sr. (Administrator), 2017
James Gallman (Administrator), 2017-2019
Ronald C. Coleman, Sr. 2019-Present

== Sources ==
- Wedin, Carolyn (1997). Inheritors of the spirit: Mary White Ovington and the founding of the NAACP. (ISBN 0471168386 / 0-471-16838-6).
- Ovington, Mary White (1996). Black and white sat down together: the reminiscences of an NAACP founder. ISBN 1-55861-099-5 / 1-55861-099-5).
- Bell, Janet Cheatham and Bond, Julian (2002). Till victory is won: famous black quotations from the NAACP. (ISBN 0743428250 / 0-7434-2825-0).
- Miller, Calvin Craig. Roy Wilkins: Leader of the NAACP. (ISBN 1931798494 / 1-931798-49-4).
- Record, Wilson. Race and radicalism: the NAACP and the Communist Party and conflict. (ISBN 0012868949 / 0-01-286894-9).
- Goings, Kenneth W. (1990). NAACP Comes of age: the defeat of Judge John J. Parker (blacks in the Diaspora). (ISBN 9780253325853).
- Harris, Jacqueline L. History and achievement of the NAACP (the African American experience). (ISBN 9780531110355).
- Janken, Kenneth Robert. White: the biography of Walter White, Mr. NAACP. (ISBN 9781565847736).
- Vose, Clement E. Caucasians only: the Supreme Court, the NAACP, and the restrictive covenant cases. (ISBN 9780520013087).
