= American Theater =

American Theater or American Theatre may refer to:

- Theater in the United States, about stage theater in the U.S.
- Camp Street Theatre, New Orleans, known as the American Theatre, the Old American Theatre, and the New American Theatre
- American Music Hall, Manhattan, known as American Theater until 1908
- Bowery Theatre, Manhattan, formerly also called the American Theatre
- Orpheum Theater (St. Louis), Missouri, formerly known as the American Theater
- American Theater (World War II), about military operations
- American Theatre (magazine)

== See also ==
- American Theatre Hall of Fame, New York City, New York
