= Dejoie =

Dejoie is a surname. Notable people with the surname include:

- Aristede Dejoie (died 1917), American businessman and politician in Louisiana
- C. C. Dejoie (1881–1970), American businessman in Louisiana
- Louis Déjoie (1896–1969), Haitian sugar planter and industrialist
