= Mercy High School =

Mercy High School may refer to:

- Mercy High School (Burlingame, California)
- Mercy High School (Red Bluff, California)
- Mercy High School (San Francisco), California
- Mercy High School (Connecticut), Middletown, Connecticut
- Mercy High School (Baltimore, Maryland)
- Mercy High School (Farmington Hills, Michigan)
- Mercy High School (Omaha, Nebraska)
- Bishop McGann-Mercy Diocesan High School, formerly Mercy High School, Riverhead, New York
- Mercy Career & Technical High School, Philadelphia, Pennsylvania, a private, Roman Catholic high school

== See also ==
- Mercy Academy, a girls Roman Catholic high school in Louisville, Kentucky
- Mother of Mercy High School (Cincinnati, Ohio)
- Our Lady of Mercy High School (disambiguation)
- Mercy College (disambiguation)
- Our Lady of Mercy College (disambiguation)
