= Favara =

Favara can refer to:

- Favara, Sicily, Italy
- Favara, Valencia, Spain
- Fabara (or Favara de Matarranya), Spain

== People ==
- Alberto Favara (1863–1923), Italian ethnomusicologist
- John Favara (1929–1980), murder victim
