= Lapointe, Haiti =

Lapointe
- Commune
- Location in Haiti
- Coordinates: 19°57′00″N 72°47′00″W
- Country: Haiti
- Department: Nord-Ouest
- Arrondissement: Port-de-Paix

Population (2015 est.)
  - Total: 9,930

Lapointe (French pronunciation: [lapwɛ̃t]; or La Pointe) is a commune in the Port-de-Paix Arrondissement, in the Nord-Ouest department of Haiti. Once a communal section, a presidential decree on 22 July 2015 made it a commune.
