= Port-de-Paix =

Port-de-Paix Pòdepè / Pòdpè (Haitian Creole)
- Commune
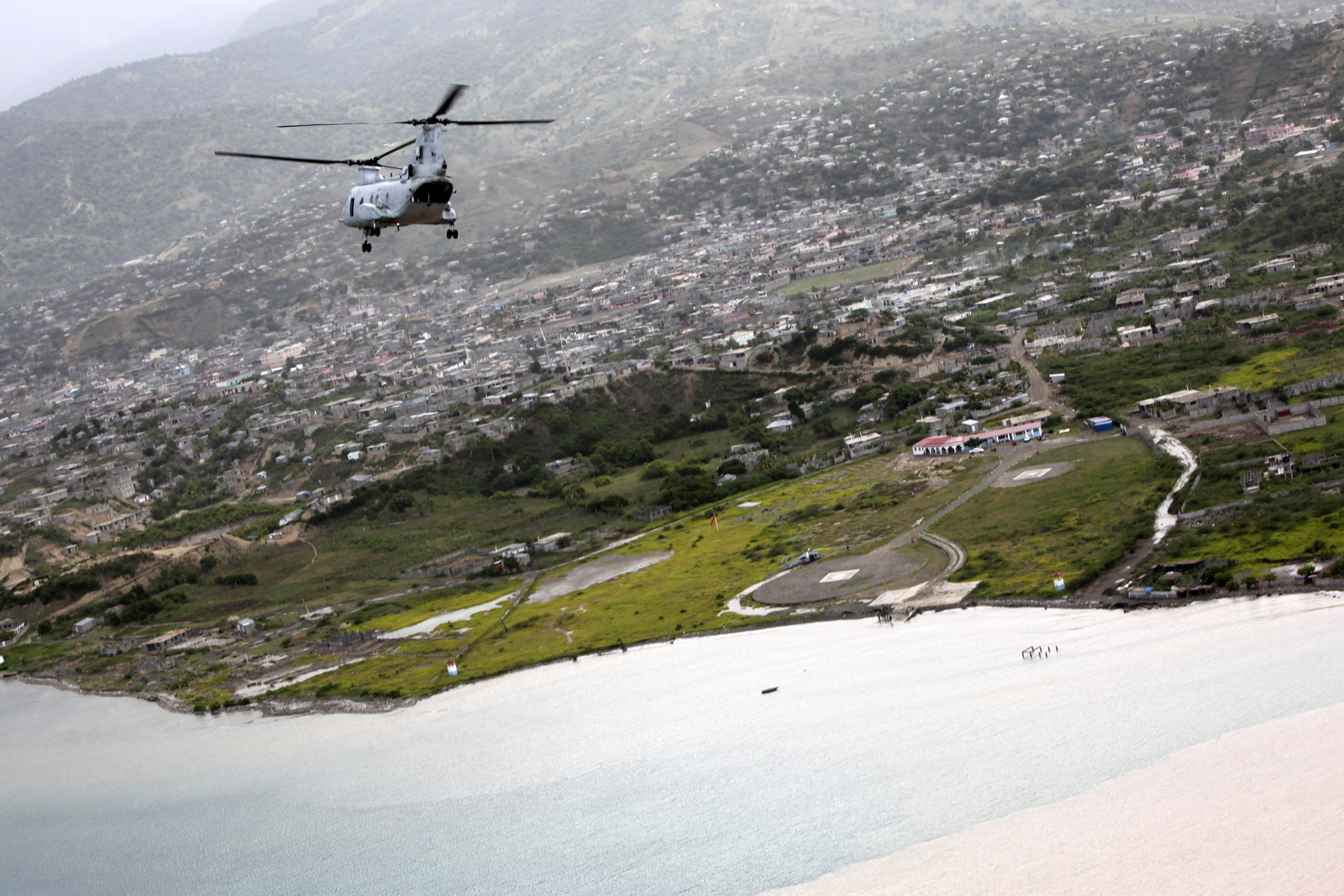
- Aerial view of the city with a Chinook in the foreground

- Location in Haiti
- Coordinates: 19°57′0″N 72°50′0″W
- Country: Haiti
- Department: Nord-Ouest
- Arrondissement: Port-de-Paix

Government
  - Mayor: Vacant

Population (2015)
  - Commune: 462,000
  - Metro: 306,217
- Time zone: UTC-05:00 (EST)
  - Summer (DST): UTC-04:00 (EDT)

Port-de-Paix (French pronunciation: [pɔʁ də pɛ]; Haitian Creole: Pòdepè or Pòdpè; meaning "Port of Peace") is a commune and the capital of the Nord-Ouest department of Haiti on the Atlantic coast. It has a population of 462,000 (2015 IHSI estimate). Port-de-Paix used to be a large exporter of bananas and coffee.

== Geography ==
The city of Port-de-Paix located on a small coastal plain on the Atlantic coast of Haiti in the Tortuga Canal on the bank of Three-Rivers in an area marked by agricultural activities.

The communes comprises:

- I. The urban centre of Port-de-Paix
- II. Baudin
- III. Aubert
- IV. Mahotière
- V. Bas-des-Moustiques
- VI. La Corne

Port-de-Paix is also the chief town of an arrondissement of the same name. The arrondissement consists of five communes: Port-de-Paix, La Pointe des Palmistes, Bassin-Bleu, Chansolme and Tortuga.

== History ==
=== Early history ===
During the Amerindian period this area was called "Xarama" by the Taïno people. The area around the town was given the name "Valparaíso" by Christopher Columbus after landing here in the late evening of December 6, 1492, and today still contains many attractive beaches and cave locations. A ferry operates between the town and Tortuga island, (La Tortue), called "Gusaeni Cahini" by the Taïnos, which is situated just across the water.

=== From 1600 to 1800 ===
The town was founded in 1665 by French filibusters, driven from Tortuga by the English. In 1676 the capital of the French Colony of Saint-Domingue was moved from Tortuga to Port-de-Paix, and it remained the seat of government until 1711 when the capital was moved to Cap-Français. In 1676, Padrejean escaped from slavery in the Port. In 1679 the town saw the first black slave revolt. The area saw great success during the 18th century but on February 27, 1903, the town was almost entirely destroyed by fire, and never attained its former status.

=== Liberation ===
In 1803, following the step of Maurepas, the general Francois Lamort Cappois and the 9th demi-brigade the French soldiers evacuated the city.

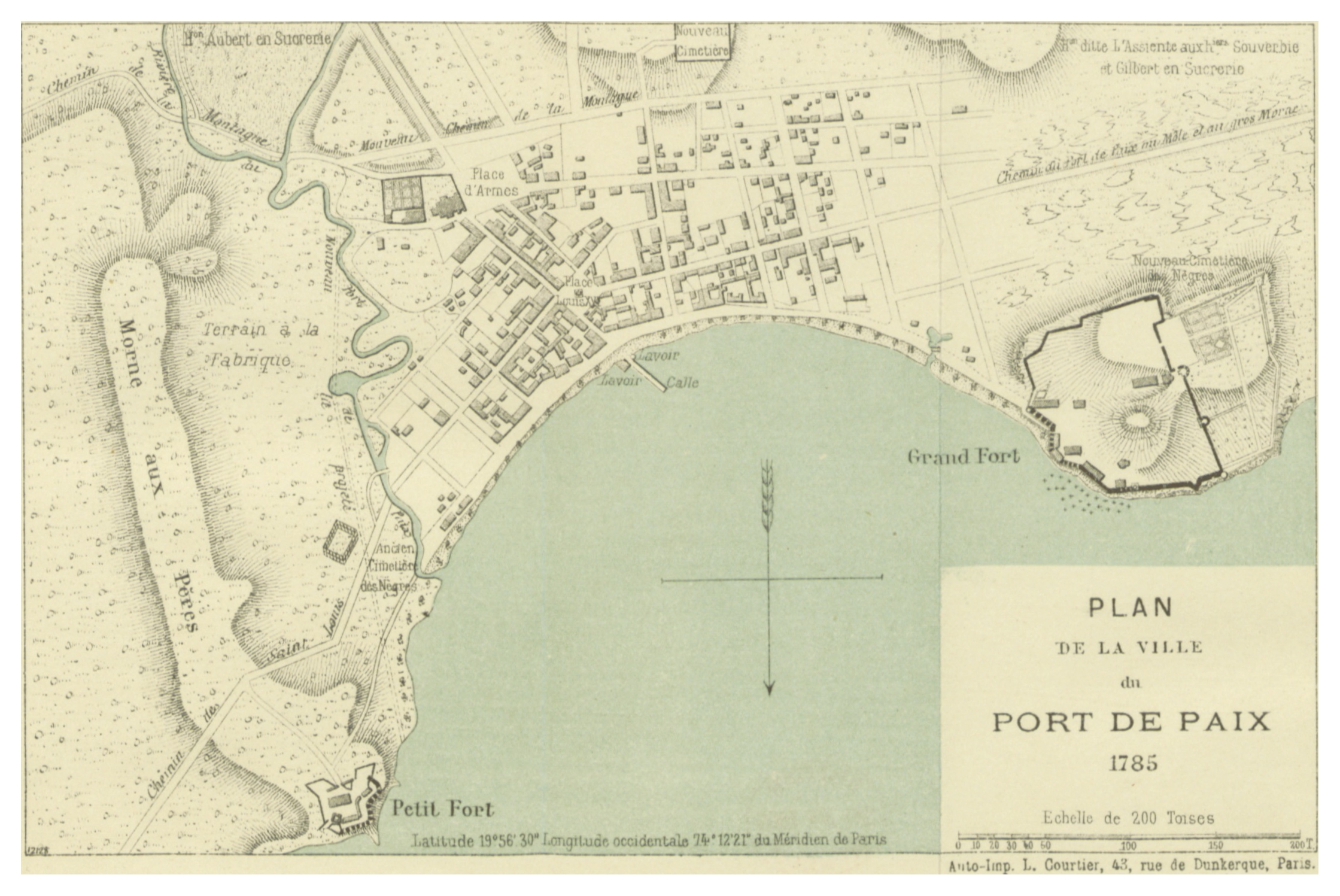
Plan de la ville du Port de Paix (1785)

== Transportation ==
Port-de-Paix is served by Port-de-Paix Airport. The RN5 connects the city to Gonaives in the Artibonite Department, the R117 connects ic to Limbé in the Guarico Department and the R151 connects it to Mole-St-Nicolas in proposed Quisqueya Department. The main streets are Stenio-Vincent, Capois, du Quai.

A ferry connects the island of Tortuga to Port-de-Paix.

== Notable people ==
- Hurby Azor
- Eliezer Cadet

== Media ==
- Le Novateur
- Kreyolofoni

=== Radio ===
- Radio Génération80 88.9fm
- Radio Tele Arnold Fm 96.9 https://www.radiotelearnoldfm.com
- Radio Toxic FM 91.3
- Radio Télé diffusion du Nord-Ouest (RTNO)92.5 & ch.6
- Radio Balade FM 102.3 MHz http://www.radiobalade.com
- Radio Melodie Inter 98.3

http://www.radiomelodieinter.com

- Radio New Star 104.1
- Radio Planète FM 100.7
- Radio Télé Universelle Plus (TRUP)103.5 FM & Ch.10
- Radio Voix Eglise Bethanie 94.3 FM
- Radio Voix de la Paix 94.7 FM
- Radio Harmonie Inter 101.5 Fm Stereo http://www.radioharmonieinter.com
- Radio Couleur FM 93.9 FM Stereo
- Radio Télé Ideal Plus 89.7 ch.40
- Radio Castro Inter 97.1
- Radio Excel Inter 106.7
- Radio Dary FM 97.5
- Radio Paismesbrebis 93.5
- Radio natal 96.7
- Radio Cosmos Inter 101.1
- Radio Perfection 105.7
- Radio Clean FM 95.1
- Radio capoix FM 106.3
- Radio Tele Port-de-Paix 88.3
- Radio magnitude fm 98.7 http://www.radiomagnitudefm.com
- Radio expression FM 98.9
- Radio union plus 92.1
- Radio omega 91.9
