= Capture of Fort Rocher =

1654 siege of the French-held island of Tortuga by the Spanish

Coordinates: 20°0′32″N 72°42′42″W

- Part of the Franco-Spanish War
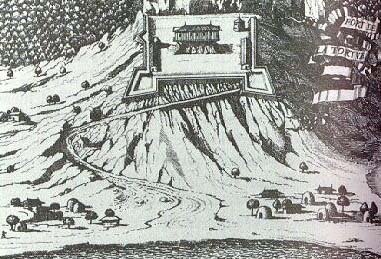
- Engraving of the Fort (17th century)
Date	9 February 1654
Location	Fort de Rocher, Tortuga Island, (present-day Haiti)
Result	Spanish victory

Belligerents
Spain: New Spain	(Kingdom of France) France (Commonwealth of England) England

Commanders and leaders
(Spain) Don Gabriel de Rojas y Figueroa	(Kingdom of France) Timoleon Otham de Fontenay (POW)

Strength
700 men	+500

Casualties and losses
Minimum	3 Warships captured 1 Frigate captured 8 minor ships captured 500 man captured 70 cannons taken

The Capture of Fort Rocher took place on 9 February 1654, during the Franco-Spanish War (1635–1659). Equipped with one siege battery, a Spanish expedition of 700 troops attacked the buccaneer stronghold of Tortuga, capturing the Fort de Rocher and 500 prisoners including 330 buccaneers and goods valued at approximately 160,000 pieces-of-eight. The Spanish burned the colony to the ground and slaughtered its inhabitants, leaving behind a fort manned by 150 soldiers. They possessed the island for about eighteen months, but on the approach of the expedition under Penn and Venables were ordered by the Conde de Peñalva, Governor of Santo Domingo, to demolish the fortifications, bury the artillery and other arms, and retire to his aid in Hispaniola.

== Background ==
At midday, the French and English inhabitants of Tortuga sighted four Spanish vessels bearing down. This counterattack had been prompted by the buccaneers' sack of Santiago de los Caballeros, in 1650, and that of the Cuban port of San Juan de los Remedios in August 1652. Consequently, a punitive expedition had slipped out of the capital of Santo Domingo on 4 December 1653, bearing 200 soldiers and 500 volunteers under Captain Gabriel de Rojas y Figueroa, seconded by the former Irish renegade John Murphy (promoted to maestre de campo and invested with a knighthood in the Order of Santiago). This Spanish squadron had captured a trio of buccaneer craft off Monte Cristi before sighting Tortuga.

== Capture ==
Gliding past its harbor, the Spaniards bombarded the vessels in the roads, then continued two or three miles farther down the coast and disembarked several hundred troops at the hamlet of Cayonne, marching back to besiege the island's principal fortress. On the night of 12 February, Rojas sent a company with grappling lines to scale the heights behind the keep and install siege artillery.

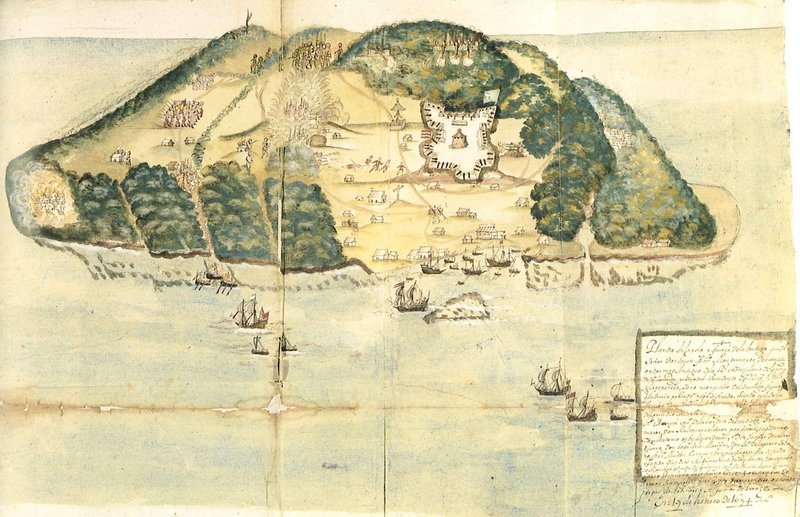
Map of Tortuga (17th century)

The buccaneer fort was built by a skilled French engineer on a rocky hill which dominated the island harbour of Cayenne. By 18 February the French and English requested terms and two days later the Chavalier de Fontenay decided to surrender. More than 500 captives were captured, among them 330 boucaniers. All were allowed to sail to France aboard a pair of ships under de Fontenay and Tibaut and Martin, respectively—with the exception of two leaders who were kept as hostages; the Spanish seized 70 cannons in the fortress and shore batteries, three ships, a frigate, and eight lesser craft as booty. These attackers also decided to hold their hard-won conquest by leaving behind a garrison of one hundred men under the Irish-born Murphy.

== Aftermath ==
The prisoners were shipped to Santo Domingo and would become slaves on Spanish plantations. Hoping that the Spanish had abandoned the island, three buccaneer ships returned in August, but found that the Spaniards had already installed a garrison. However, coinciding with the English invasion of Hispaniola, on 13 September 1654 Spanish governor issued a real cédula ordering the withdrawal from Tortuga after first throwing down its fortifications. Tortuga was reoccupied the next year by English and French settlers under Elias Watts, who secured a commission from Col. William Brayne, acting as military Governor on Jamaica, to serve as "Governor" of Tortuga.
