= T. B. Stamps =

Louisiana reconstruction era American politician

Louisiana House of Representatives
- In office 1870–1872

Louisiana State Senate
- In office 1872–1880

Personal details
- Born: March 10, 1846 Monticello, Mississippi
- Died: November 27, 1898 (aged 52) New Orleans
- Party: Republican

T. B. Stamps (March 10, 1846 - November 27, 1898) was a businessman, coroner, and newspaper editor who served in the Louisiana House of Representatives and Louisiana State Senate during the Reconstruction era.

== Early life ==
Stamps was born March 10, 1846, in Monticello, Mississippi. He was a well known businessman in Southern Louisiana and was a commission merchant and cotton factor in Jefferson Parish, Louisiana.

== Career ==
He was a delegate to the 1870 Republican State Convention representing Jefferson Parish and was selected to be on the State Central Committee serving on the sub-executive committee.

Stamps was elected to the Louisiana House of Representatives and served from 1870 until 1872. He was then elected to the Louisiana State Senate and served from 1872 until 1880. During his senatorial service he was a member of many committees and in his last year he was appointed to the Crescent City Police, Apportionment, Penitentiary, Corporations and Parochial Affairs and Public Lands and Levees committees.

In 1874 he was a delegate to the Republican State Convention representing the seventeenth ward and he served on the Committee on Peace and Order. Days after the passing of the Civil Rights Act of 1875, Stamps along with Aristede Dejoie attended a play in a previously segregated St. Charles Theatre, an event that was reported in newspapers across the country. At the 1879 Louisiana State Constitutional Convention, Stamps along with other delegates P. B. S. Pinchback, T. T. Allain and Henry Demas pushed for equal opportunities in higher learning which eventually resulted in the founding of the Southern University.

Stamps also served as coroner, represented Jefferson Parish as an agent of the New Orleans Louisianian and worked in the customs house. After Reconstruction he became editor of the Louisiana Standard newspaper. In 1896 he endorsed William Jennings Bryan due to his support for Free silver and he helped organize a group of black men to advocate for Bryan.

== Personal life ==
He died on the morning of November 27, 1898, at his home in New Orleans in the presence of his wife, children, and mother.

== See also ==
- African American officeholders from the end of the Civil War until before 1900
