= Alberto Favara =

Alberto Favara (1863-1923), an Italian ethnomusicologist, is one of the pioneers of the scholarly study of Sicilian folk music. He studied at the Palermo Conservatory and later in Milan. In 1895 he became a music professor at the Palermo Conservatory. In 1907 he published Canti della terra e del mare di Sicilia (Songs of the land and sea of Sicily), followed in 1921 by an additional collection of Canti popolari siciliani (Sicilian Folk Songs). Favara was also the composer of miscellaneous vocal works and instrumental pieces for orchestra and chamber groups. The full extent of Favara's groundbreaking work as a collector of Sicilian folk songs was not known until 1957, 34 years after his death, when a complete collection of 1,090 folk songs, transcribed into music notation by Favara, were published in the two volume set Corpus di Musichi Populari Siciliane; a work edited by Ottavio Tiby.
