= Bombardopolis =

Bombardopolis Bonbadopolis
- Commune
- Location in Haiti
- Coordinates: 19°42′0″N 73°20′0″W
- Country: Haiti
- Department: Nord-Ouest
- Arrondissement: Môle-Saint-Nicolas

Area
  - Total: 196.51 km^{2} (75.87 sq mi)
- Elevation: 416 m (1,365 ft)

Population (2015)
  - Total: 36,028
  - Density: 183/km^{2} (470/sq mi)
- est. adult population only
- Time zone: UTC-05:00 (EST)
  - Summer (DST): UTC-04:00 (EDT)

Bombardopolis (French pronunciation: [bɔ̃baʁdɔpɔlis]; Haitian Creole: Bonbadopolis) is a commune located in the hilly country of the Môle-Saint-Nicolas Arrondissement, in the Nord-Ouest department of Haiti.

== History ==
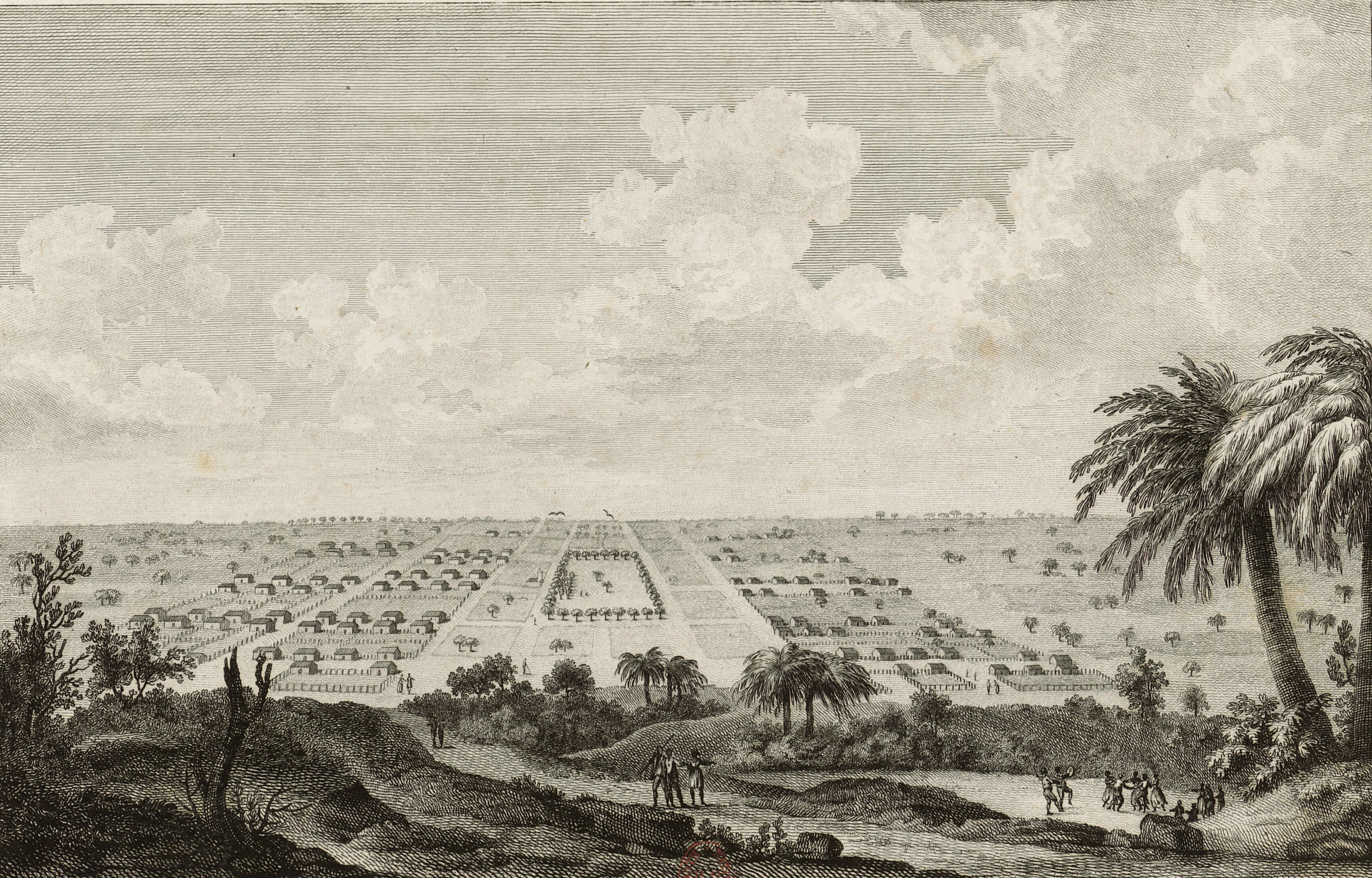
Bombardopolis, 1791

Bombardopolis was founded in 1764 by German settlers with the support of the nearby Director of Môle, Mr. Fusée Aublet. A population of French Acadians who had been living in Louisiana and Germans from French Guiana had arrived in Môle-Saint-Nicolas. The local government wished to separate those of German ancestry from the Acadians, judging the two cultures could not happily coexist. The new community was named after Fusée Aublet's German benefactor, Pierre-Paul Bombarda, a wealthy financier and amateur naturalist, son of Gio Paolo Bombarda.

During the colonial period, Bombardopolis was first a parish under the administration of the Quartier du Môle-Saint-Nicolas, and then was elevated to canton status in 1797. Bombardopolis was made a commune of the Republic of Haiti in 1821, during the administration of President Jean-Pierre Boyer.

== Economy ==
The local economy is mainly based on the production of charcoal, goat farming and fishing.

== Demography ==
The commune had an estimated adult population of 36,028 for the year 2015.

The commune had an estimated adult population of 32,764 for the year 2009.

The commune had an enumerated population of 27,360 for the year 2003.

== Communal Sections ==
Bombardopolis is subdivided into three communal sections, namely:

- Plate-Forme (contains the municipality of Bombardopolis)
- Des Forges
- Plaine-d'Oranges
