= Our Lady of Mercy College =

Our Lady of Mercy College may refer to the following Roman Catholic schools:

== Australia ==
- Our Lady of Mercy College, Australind, Western Australia
- Our Lady of Mercy College, Burraneer, NSW
- Our Lady of Mercy College, Heidelberg, Victoria
- Our Lady of Mercy College, Parramatta, NSW

=== Merged from Our Lady of Mercy College ===
- Red Bend Catholic College, Forbes, NSW (Our Lady of Mercy College, Forbes, and Our Lady of Mercy High School, Parkes)
- Trinity Catholic College, Goulburn, NSW
- St Patrick's College, Mackay, Queensland

== Ireland ==
- Our Lady of Mercy College, Carysfort, Dublin

== Philippines ==
- Our Lady of Mercy College – Bacolod, Bacolod City

== See also ==
- Our Lady of Mercy Academy (disambiguation)
- Our Lady of Mercy High School (disambiguation)
