= Fort de Rocher =

Fortress on the Caribbean island of Tortuga

Coordinates: 20°0′32″N 72°42′42″W

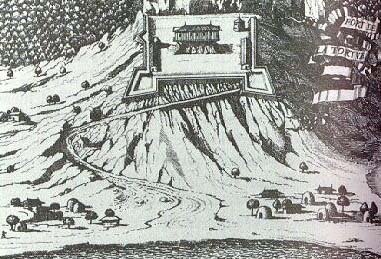
Plan of Fort de Rocher

Fort de Rocher (sometimes called Fort de la Roche or Dovecote) was a seventeenth-century fortress on the Caribbean island of Tortuga, northwest of Haiti. It was built and utilized by buccaneers as the primary defense of the island to prevent encroachment of Spanish forces. The fortress lies in ruin today, with only the foundations remaining.

== History ==
Tortuga was a disputed island in the early seventeenth century. The Spanish laid claim to it, but English and French settlers were the primary occupants. Every few years the Spanish would sail over and chase away the settlers, reclaiming the island, then vacate it. As soon as the Spanish warships were out of sight, the settlers would return.

In 1640 a French engineer named Jean Le Vasseur raided the island with a force of between fifty and one-hundred men, claiming the primary port as theirs. Aware of the predations of the Spanish, Le Vasseur had Fort de Rocher constructed overlooking the harbor, thus fortifying it from further foreign assault. With its cannons drawing a steady aim at any vessels approaching the harbor the fort gave Le Vasseur a high degree of control over the island. In the early 1640s Le Vasseur was made governor of Tortuga, but the information conflicts as to when specifically that was (some accounts claim he was governor before arriving on the island, and others say he claimed power after building the fort).

The erection of the fort concerned the Spanish. Shortly after construction was complete, an invading force launched from Santo Domingo and sailed into the harbor of Tortuga. The French guns sank one of the vessels and scattered the rest. The Spaniards who managed to land marched into an ambush, and then retreated.

The victory greatly increased the reputation of Le Vasseur, Tortuga, and its Buccaneers. The official lawlessness of the place appealed to all of the seafaring brigands in the Caribbean. Le Vasseur opened the port to outlaws of all nations in exchange for a percentage of the wealth of every vessel anchoring there. All pirates needed a safe place to berth, and a town that was respectful of their careers was a prime one. Tortuga quickly became the first great pirate outpost.

The reports about Le Vasseur’s rule vary widely. The one common thread among them, though, is that in 1653 he was assassinated by two of his trusted lieutenants. As the story goes, Le Vasseur had stolen away one of his lieutenant’s mistresses and abused her. The two men schemed to get him out of the fort where they could perform the treachery unseen. While inspecting a warehouse, the jilted lover wounded him with a musket first and then both men finished him off with daggers. The story may or may not be true, but it is widely accepted that Le Vasseur was assassinated by his men in 1653.

With Le Vasseur dead, the French assigned Chevalier de Fontenay as Governor of Tortuga. As a leader, de Fontenay didn’t take the safeguarding of the port as seriously as Le Vasseur did. The Spanish were able to see the fort’s influence decline and in 1654, while many of the Buccaneers were at sea or off hunting, they raided the port. The Spanish were rebuffed, but they mounted a second attack later in the year. This time, they knew the strengths and weaknesses of the fortress, and managed to get artillery placed on the hillside above it. After a siege of about nine days, the Buccaneers who had holed up in the fort surrendered and were banished from the island. The Spanish reclaimed the island, demolished much of the fort, and then vacated back to Santo Domingo. The fort was allowed to decay into history and today only its foundations remain.

== Geography ==
On the southeast side of Tortuga is a natural harbor. The harbor is protected by reefs and is flanked on the west by a Mangrove thicket and the town of Cayenne, and on the east by the town of Basse Terre. The remains of the fort are on the hillside, about 0.5 kilometres (0.3 miles) north of the harbor at Basse Terre. Its approximate location is 20°,-72.7°. Using Google Maps, you can see the remains of the coastal battery outlined by vegetation.

== Description ==
Fort de Rocher was built circa 1640 by Jean Le Vasseur, an engineer by trade. It was built around a steep rock which stood thirty feet high and which was central on a plateau from the hillside. The plateau was relatively flat-topped and Le Vasseur built terraces and breastworks all along its edges and into the hillside, enough to accommodate hundreds of men. Star forts were being employed in Europe at this time, so Fort de Rocher was built with two star-points, or redans, facing the coast. The hillside was cleared of trees to give a nearly 180° view of the waterfront. The fortress boasted 24 guns overlooking the harbor and its environs. It also housed a natural water spring.

Atop the mighty rock which dominated the fortress, Le Vasseur placed his reduit, which he named Dovecote. There was only one path that allowed entrance up into the building, the first half of which was a stairway carved into the rock itself. The second half was by a ladder that could be lowered from the top. The fortress used a storehouse for food, guns, and ammunition, and also acted as Le Vasseur’s abode.

Rumor has it that Le Vasseur had a cruel streak. Some sources claim that he had an iron cage built that was used as a prison. It wasn’t tall enough for a person to stand upright, nor was it long or wide enough for a person to lie down. The cage was dubbed "Little Hell" and was housed inside Dovecote.

The fortress stood against many assaults. Its existence and toughness provided a principal base of operations for pirates in the Caribbean. The fact that it was only defeated through the treachery of Le Vasseur’s trusted men is a testimony to its strength.

== See also ==
- Buccaneers
- Capture of Fort Rocher
- Piracy in the Caribbean
- Port Royal
- Tortuga
