= Jean-Rabel =

Jean-Rabel Jan Rabèl
- Commune
- Location in Haiti
- Coordinates: 19°51′0″N 73°12′0″W
- Country: Haiti
- Department: Nord-Ouest
- Arrondissement: Môle-Saint-Nicolas

Area
  - Total: 488.13 km^{2} (188.47 sq mi)
- Elevation: 106 m (348 ft)

Population (2015)
  - Total: 148,416
  - Density: 304/km^{2} (790/sq mi)
- est. adult population only
- Time zone: UTC-05:00 (EST)
  - Summer (DST): UTC-04:00 (EDT)

Jean-Rabel (French pronunciation: [ʒɑ̃ ʁabɛl]; Haitian Creole: Jan Rabèl) is a commune located west of the city of Port-de-Paix and east of the city of the Môle-Saint-Nicolas Arrondissement, in the Nord-Ouest department of Haiti. As of 2015, the estimated adult population was 148,416.

The city of Jean-Rabel is the most important in the western area of the department. It is bordered by the Atlantic Ocean on the north, the District of Môle Saint Nicolas on the west side, the District of Port-de-Paix on the east, and the City of Anse-Rouge in the Department of Artibonite on the south.

== Mountain ranges ==
Jean-Rabel's territory contains two mountain ranges. The Saint Nicolas mountain range is located in the central part and has the two highest altitude points (the Pic Morvan, 800 meters high, and the Mount Château, 840 meters high), The Jean-Rabel mountain range's highest point is 850 meters.

== Demographics ==
The commune had an estimated adult population of 148,416 for the year 2015.

The commune had an estimated adult population of 134,969 for the year 2009.

The commune had an enumerated population of 125,745 for the year 2003.

== Administrative division ==
The commune of Jean-Rabel is subdivided into seven communal sections, namely:

- Lacoma
- Guinaudee
- Vielle Hatte
- La Montagne
- Dessources
- Grande Source
- Diondion

== Places with the same name ==
La ville de Jean-Rabel shares its name with the town (French: ville, le bourg) of Jean-Rabel, a major metropolitan business area. The city of Jean-Rabel is 23 mi/37 km west-southwest of Port-de-Paix and 155.35 mi/250 km north of Port-au-Prince. The city also shares its name with the river: la Rivière de Jean-Rabel.

The Republic of Haïti has three places with the name of Jean Rabel:

- Jean-Rabel in the North-West Department (Lat 19°52′ N Long 73°11′W)
- Jean Rabel in the North-East Department (Lat 19°26′ N Long 71°47′W)
- Jean Rabel in the South-East Department (Lat 18° N Long 72° W)
