= Cherette =

- Communal section
- Location in Haiti
- Coordinates: 18°17′27″N 73°31′08″W
- Country: Haiti
- Department: Sud
- Arrondissement: Aquin
- Elevation: 42 m (138 ft)

Cherette is a communal section in the Saint Louis du Sud commune of the Aquin Arrondissement, in the Sud department of Haiti.
