= Port-de-Paix Arrondissement =

Coordinates: 19.95°N 72.8333°W

Port-de-Paix Arrondissement Arrondissement de Port-de-Paix Awondisman Podpè
- Arrondissement
- Interactive map of Port-de-Paix Arrondissement
- Country: Haiti
- Department: Nord-Ouest

Area
  - Arrondissement: 799.71 km^{2} (308.77 sq mi)
  - Urban: 14.14 km^{2} (5.46 sq mi)
  - Rural: 785.57 km^{2} (303.31 sq mi)

Population (2015)
  - Arrondissement: 336,650
  - Density: 420.97/km^{2} (1,090.3/sq mi)
  - Urban: 133,424
  - Rural: 203,226
- Time zone: UTC-5 (Eastern)
- Postal code: HT31—
- Communes: 5
- Communal Sections: 13
- IHSI Code: 091

Port-de-Paix (Haitian Creole: Podpè) is an arrondissement in the Nord-Ouest department of Haiti. As of 2015, the population was 336,650 inhabitants. Postal codes in the Port-de-Paix Arrondissement start with the number 31.

The arrondissement consists of the following communes:

- Port-de-Paix
- Bassin-Bleu
- Chansolme
- Lapointe
- Île de la Tortue (the island Tortuga)
