= Tiby =

Tiby may refer to:

- Thelma Eisen, "Tiby" (May 11, 1922 – May 11, 2014), American baseball player
- Ottavio Tiby (1891-1955) Italian ethnomusicologist
- Tiby Liebenow
- Tiby, the name of a bonobo and chimpanzee hybrid featured in the 2017 Swedish film The Square
