= One Drop East =

One Drop East + Remixes & Outtakes

Studio album by Salmonella Dub
- Released: 25 November 2003
- Recorded: 2002–2003
- Genre: Reggae
- Length: 64.25
- Label: EMI

Salmonella Dub chronology
Salmonella Dub (re-release) (2004)	One Drop East + Remixes & Outtakes (2003)	Mercy (2004)

One Drop East is the fifth studio album by New Zealand dub group, Salmonella Dub released in 2003. The album was re-released as a double edition remix album, titled One Drop East + Remixes & Outtakes.

== Track listing ==
- One Drop East
1. "Longtime"
2. "Slide"
3. "Dancehall Girl"
4. "Nu Steppa"
5. "Dub Survivor"
6. "Ez On"
7. "Octopus"
8. "Simmer Down"
9. "Pure"
10. "Bubble"
- One Drop East + Remixes & Outtakes

=== Disc one ===
1. "Longtime"
2. "Slide"
3. "Dancehall Girl"
4. "Nu Steppa"
5. "Dub Survivor"
6. "Ez On"
7. "Octopus"
8. "Simmer Down"
9. "Pure"
10. "Bubble"

=== Disc two ===
1. "Longtime" (Sativa Records Remix) featuring MC YT
2. "Mercy (Mu Remix)"
3. "Slide (Radio Cut)"
4. "Ez On (Concord Dawn Remix)"
5. "Dancehall Girl (Jagwah Mix)"
6. "DnB and the Doppla Effect"
7. "Nu Steppa (Nat Clarxon and DJ Digital Remix)"
8. "Funky Unky Meets Kill Bill"
9. "Mercy (Mad Professor Mix)"

== Charts ==
Chart performance for One Drop East
Chart (2003)	Peak position
Australian Albums (ARIA)	84
New Zealand Albums (RMNZ)	1

== Certifications ==
Certifications for One Drop East
Region	Certification	Certified units/sales
New Zealand (RMNZ)	Platinum	15,000^{^}
^{^} Shipments figures based on certification alone.
