= Corail-Henri =

- Communal section
- Location in Haiti
- Coordinates: 18°17′45″N 73°33′15″W
- Country: Haiti
- Department: Sud
- Arrondissement: Aquin
- Elevation: 65 m (213 ft)

Corail-Henri (French pronunciation: [kɔʁaj ɑ̃ʁi]) is a communal section in the Saint Louis du Sud commune of the Aquin Arrondissement, in the Sud department of Haiti.
