= Grande Plaine =

- Communal section
- Location in Haiti
- Coordinates: 18°31′22″N 74°20′27″W
- Country: Haiti
- Department: Grand'Anse
- Arrondissement: Jérémie
- Elevation: 203 m (666 ft)

Grande Plaine (French pronunciation: [ɡʁɑ̃d plɛn]) is a communal section in the Chambellan commune of the Jérémie Arrondissement, in the Grand'Anse department of Haiti.
