= Saint-Louis-du-Nord Arrondissement =

Coordinates: 19.9333°N 72.7167°W

Saint-Louis-du-Nord Arrondissement Arrondissement de Saint-Louis-du-Nord Awondisman Sen Lwi dinò
- Arrondissement
- Interactive map of Saint-Louis-du-Nord Arrondissement
- Country: Haiti
- Department: Nord-Ouest

Area
  - Arrondissement: 187.74 km^{2} (72.49 sq mi)
  - Urban: 3.47 km^{2} (1.34 sq mi)
  - Rural: 184.27 km^{2} (71.15 sq mi)

Population (2015)
  - Arrondissement: 146,567
  - Density: 780.69/km^{2} (2,022.0/sq mi)
  - Urban: 46,605
  - Rural: 99,962
- Time zone: UTC-5 (Eastern)
- Postal code: HT32—
- Communes: 2
- Communal Sections: 9
- IHSI Code: 092

Saint-Louis-du-Nord (Haitian Creole: Sen Lwi dinò) is an arrondissement in the Nord-Ouest department of Haiti. As of 2015, the population was 146,567 inhabitants. Postal codes in the Saint-Louis-du-Nord Arrondissement start with the number 32.

The arrondissement consists of the following municipalities:

- Saint-Louis-du-Nord
- Anse-à-Foleur
