= Aristede Dejoie =

American politician

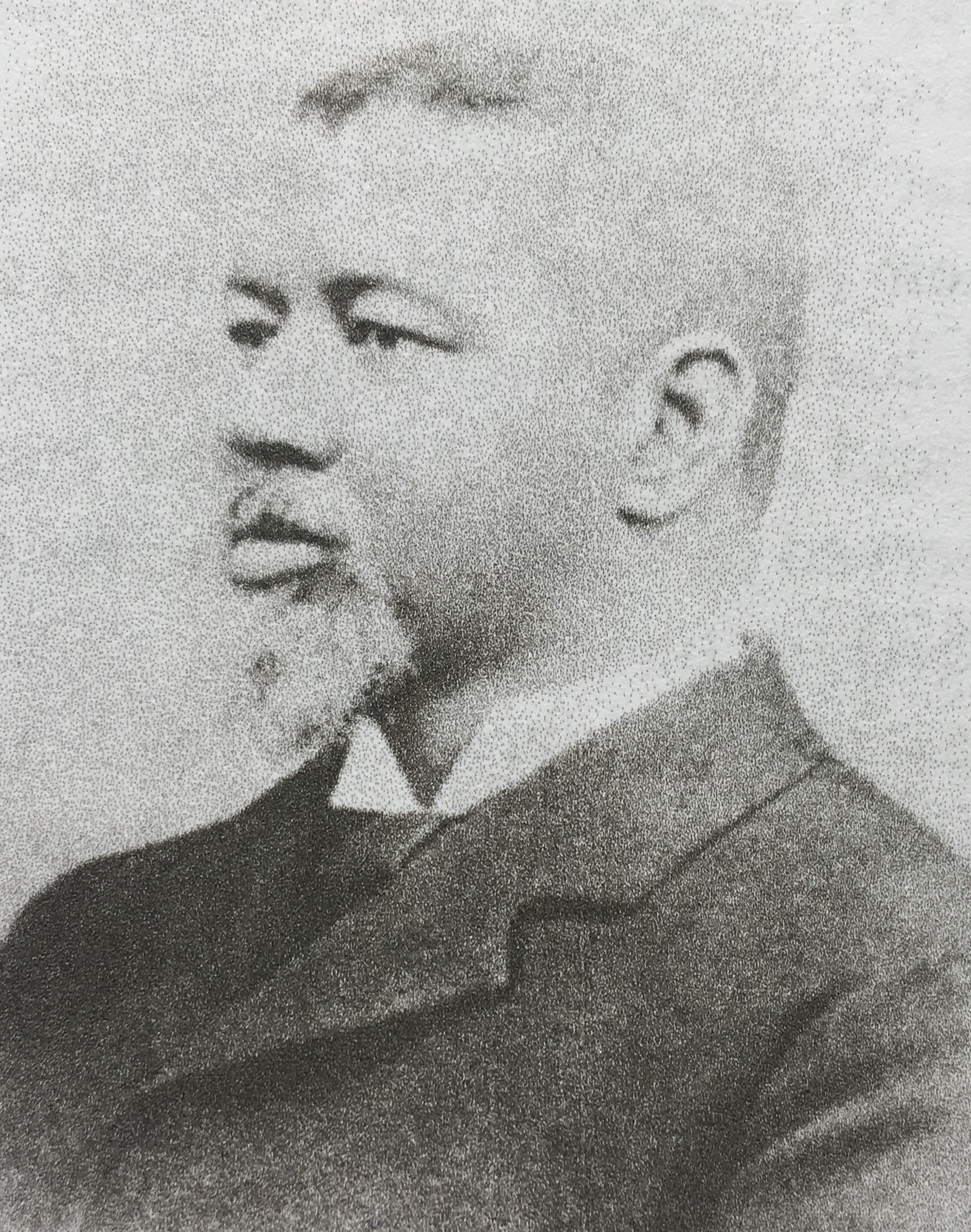

Aristede Dejoie (died 1917) was a businessman and state legislator in Louisiana. He served as a member of the Louisiana House of Representatives from 1872 to 1874 and 1877 to 1879.

He also served as a tax assessor. He and T. B. Stamps asserted their civil rights by purchasing tickets to the dress circle at the St. Charles Theatre in New Orleans in 1875. He was secretary of the Cosmopolitan Insurance Association.

== Personal life ==
Dejoie was the father of Paul Dejoie and C.C. Dejoie. He also was a Republican in the era of progressivism and pro-Black sentiment within the party during and after Reconstruction.

In his political career he represented New Orleans, where he opened a bakery and eatery. He was a leader in the local affiliate of the National Negro Business League and helped lead Unity Life Insurance with his sons to become an influential firm despite facing discrimination.

== See also ==
- African American officeholders from the end of the Civil War until before 1900
