= Savannette =

- Village
- Location in Haiti
- Coordinates: 18.2205515°N 73.8181043°W
- Country: Haiti
- Department: Sud
- Arrondissement: Les Cayes
- Elevation: 59 m (194 ft)

Savannette (French pronunciation: [savanɛt]) is a village in the Les Cayes commune of the Les Cayes Arrondissement, in the Sud department of Haiti.
