= Mercy College =

Mercy College may refer to:

- Mercy Catholic College, Chatswood, New South Wales, Australia
- Mercy College (Dublin), Ireland
- Mercy College, Sligo, Ireland
- Mercy University, Dobbs Ferry, New York, a private, non-sectarian, non-profit, coeducational research university called Mercy College until August 2023.
- Mercy College, Perth, Western Australia
- Mercy College, Mackay, Queensland, Australia; see St Patrick's College, Mackay
- Mercy College of Health Sciences, Des Moines, Iowa
- Mercy College of Ohio, Toledo and Youngstown, Ohio

== See also ==
- Our Lady of Mercy College
- Gwynedd Mercy University, Lower Gwynedd Township, Pennsylvania
- Gwynedd Mercy Academy High School, Lower Gwynedd Township, Pennsylvania
- Mercy Academy, Louisville, Kentucky
- Mercy Career & Technical High School, Philadelphia, Pennsylvania
- Monte Sant'Angelo Mercy College, North Sydney, New South Wales, Australia
- Mount Lilydale Mercy College, Lilydale, Victoria
- Mount Mercy University, Cedar Rapids, Iowa
- Mount Mercy College, Cork, Ireland
- University of Detroit Mercy, a private, Roman Catholic co-educational university
