= St. Charles Theatre =

Theater in New Orleans, Louisiana, US

Coordinates: 29.95005°N 90.07017°W

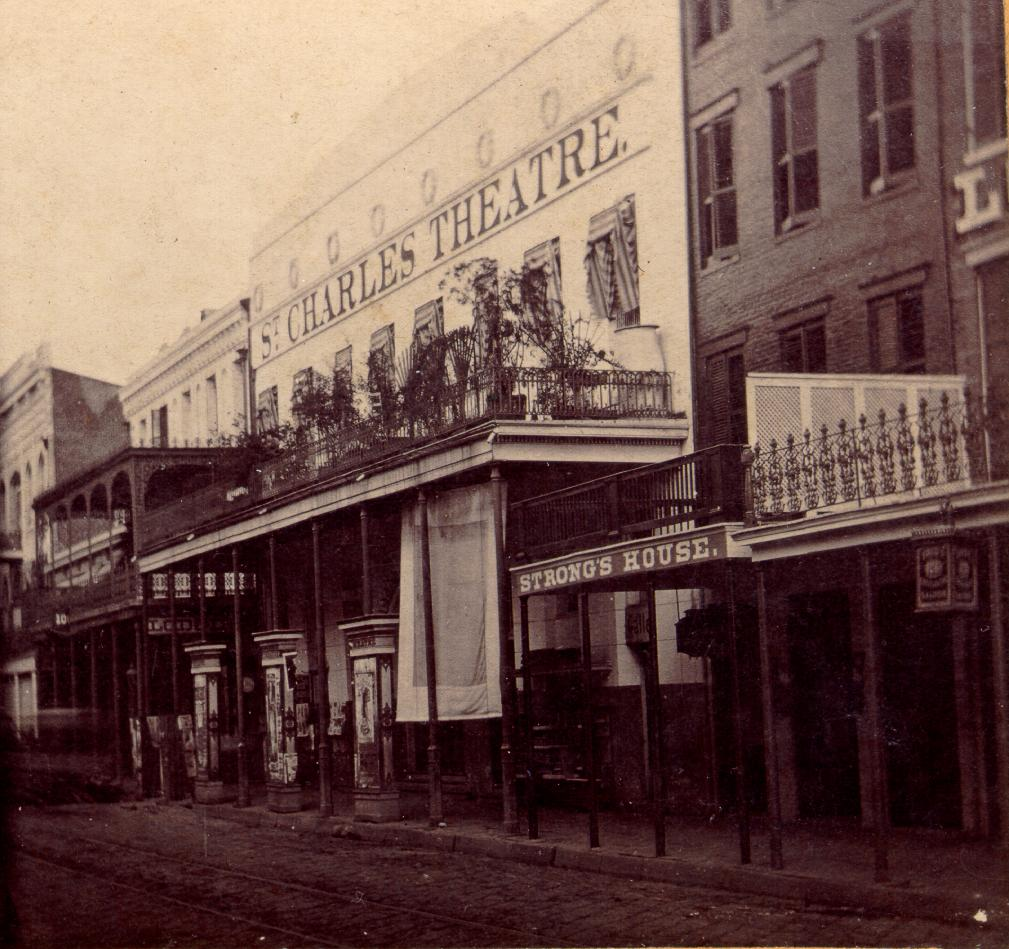
Image of the St. Charles Theatre

The St. Charles Theatre was a theater in New Orleans, United States, between 1835 and 1967.

It was founded by James H. Caldwell to replace the Camp Street Theatre and was for a time the only English theater in New Orleans. It was considered the finest theater building in America in 1835. It burnt down in 1842 but was rebuilt in 1843, then burnt and rebuilt a third time in 1899.

In the late 1870s, it was purchased by Gilbert R. Spalding and David Bidwell with the intent of restoring the theater to its previous first-rate position, but those plans were ended by Spalding's death in 1880.

It was segregated until the signing of the Civil Rights Act of 1875 and a few days later civil rights activists and legislators T. B. Stamps and Aristede Dejoie attended a play that was reported in newspapers across the country.
