= Our Lady of Mercy Academy =

Our Lady of Mercy Academy may refer to:

- Our Lady of Mercy Academy (New Jersey), Newfield, New Jersey
- Our Lady of Mercy Academy (New York), Syosset, New York
- Academy of Our Lady of Mercy, Lauralton Hall, Milford, Connecticut

== See also ==
- Our Lady of Mercy High School (disambiguation)
