= Anse-à-Foleur =

Anse-à-Foleur: Ansafolè
- Commune
- Location in Haiti
- Coordinates: 19°54′0″N 72°37′0″W
- Country: Haiti
- Department: Nord-Ouest
- Arrondissement: Saint-Louis-du-Nord

Area
  - Total: 62.14 km^{2} (23.99 sq mi)
- Elevation: 0 m (0 ft)

Population (March, 2015)
  - Total: 30,217
  - Density: 486/km^{2} (1,260/sq mi)
- Time zone: UTC-05:00 (EST)
  - Summer (DST): UTC-04:00 (EDT)

Anse-à-Foleur (French pronunciation: [ɑ̃s a fɔlœʁ]; Haitian Creole: Ansafolè) is a commune in the Saint-Louis-du-Nord Arrondissement, in the Nord-Ouest department of Haiti.
