= Mercy (Salmonella Dub album) =

Remix album by Salmonella Dub
- Released: 25 November 2004
- Label: EMI

Salmonella Dub chronology
One Drop East (2004)	Mercy (2004)	Remixes and Radio Cuts (2006)

Mercy is the sixth studio recorded album of New Zealand Dub band, Salmonella Dub released in 2004, the year after the release of their album One Drop East.

This special edition consists of nine songs, recorded at the same time as the One Drop East sessions, featuring remixes of One Drop East songs and some guest appearances. The Mad Professor remix of "Mercy" was originally intended to be released on One Drop East but was not completed in time. Many of the tracks are more upbeat than their One Drop East counterparts, such as the Drum 'n' Bass version of "Ez On" remixed by Concord Dawn. However, the album retains Salmonella Dub's distinctive style and is somewhat reminiscent of their earlier work.

The album spent 3 weeks on the New Zealand Album Charts, peaking at number 35 in January 2005.

== Track listing ==
1. "Longtime (Sativa Records Remix) featuring MC YT
2. "Mercy (Mu Remix)"
3. "Slide (Radio Cut)"
4. "Ez On (Concord Dawn Remix)"
5. "Dancehall Girl (Jagwah Mix)"
6. "DnB and the Doppla Effect"
7. "Nu Steppa (Nat Clarxon and DJ Digital Remix)"
8. "Funky Unky Meets Kill Bill"
9. "Mercy (Mad Professor Mix)
