= The Louisiana Weekly =

Weekly newspaper published in New Orleans

- Type: Weekly newspaper
- Owner: Dejoie family
- Founder(s): C.C. Dejoie and Orlando Taylor
- Founded: 1925
- Language: English
- Headquarters: New Orleans, Louisiana
- Website: www.louisianaweekly.com

The Louisiana Weekly is a weekly newspaper published in New Orleans, Louisiana. It emphasizes topics of interest to the African-American community, especially in the New Orleans area and south Louisiana. It has an estimated weekly circulation of 6,500.

The Louisiana Weekly was established by the C.C. Dejoie family in 1925. The paper has covered social justice issues including "education, the environment, politics and protest," including such diverse topics as the Black Panther Party and the threat of hydrofluoric acid contamination at a New Orleans area refinery. The newspaper also has a Spanish-language page aimed at south Louisiana's significant Central American population. The newspaper presently uses the tagline "Your Multicultural News Medium".

Publication of the Louisiana Weekly was interrupted (in print only) because of the flooding caused by Hurricane Katrina in August and September 2005.

Past issues of The Louisiana Weekly are archived by the Amistad Research Center of New Orleans.

== History ==
Founded in 1925 by Orlando Capitola Ward Taylor and Constant C. Dejoie Sr., The Louisiana Weekly is one of the oldest African-American newspapers that is still in circulation. "Their vision was to create a newspaper dedicated to the enlightening, ennobling and empowering people of color". The newspaper focused on topics that they felt were not getting the attention it deserved. The paper first worked out of the Pythian Temple Building at 234 Loyola Avenue. The first issue, which appeared on September 19, 1925, chronicled the life of educator and singer Professor John Wesley Work. Originally, the paper was called The New Orleans Herald but the name was changed in October. The newspaper sales were increasing as soon as the paper became available. "The annual subscription rate of the newspaper was two dollars, with six-month, one-month, and one-issue rates available at $1.25, 20 cents, and five cents, respectively." Even though the newspaper is based in Louisiana, the paper was read worldwide.

== People ==
The Dejoie family was one of the most prominent black families in New Orleans; they owned the Unity Industrial Life Insurance Company. O.C.W. Taylor was a former teacher and principal in the New Orleans Public School system. Mr. Taylor received his bachelor's degree from Wylie College in Texas having distinguished himself with the debate team and a Masters from Columbia University which has, within its oral history project, a tape of Mr. Taylor talking about his experiences at the Louisiana Weekly giving more history and information on that period of time. He also had a television show on WNOE TV, which was about students, teachers and their achievements in the New Orleans Public School system and a radio show on WNOE radio. Besides the Louisiana Weekly, O. C. W. Taylor worked with George Schuyler, a close friend and fellow Mason at the Pittsburgh Courier. The Pittsburgh Couriers first office in the south was in Mr. Taylors home at 1667 North Roman Street. His daughter - Doris Gaynelle Taylor was society editor for the Louisiana Weekly and the Pittsburgh Courier.

During O. C. W. Taylors' time at the Louisiana Weekly, which lasted many years, he successfully chaired the papers' Victory Bond sales drive, which met its goal with the help of Taylor's daughter Doris Gaynelle Taylor. Doris, who was named after Doris Zemurray, was the model on the posters showing her picture in the "V" as O. C. W. and his daughter circulated the city selling the Victory Bonds. Emmanuel Gregoire was also active in the Victory Bond campaign, which was a large event in New Orleans during that period of time. Mr. Taylor, who served as editor of the Louisiana Weekly during its early years, took a leave of absence from his job as teacher and principal with the New Orleans Public School System to work with C. C. Dejoie to bring the paper to a viable place. It was clear after the first year or two that the paper needed someone full-time if this project was going to succeed. Taylors' wife - Marceline Bucksell Taylor - supported the family during that time when money was short because of the sacrifices they decided to make to help the Louisiana Weekly become a substantial publication. Marceline Taylor and C. C. Dejoie's wife- Vivian - were close friends and spent time sewing together for their club, the Circle de Service, so to them it was family bringing in family to move the Louisiana Weekly along to success.

O. C. W. brought his brother-in-law, Louis Peter Bucksell, a pharmacist in the city of New Orleans who had three pharmacies around the state, but whose passion was photography, to work with the paper to do much of the needed photography. Since Louis Bucksell had his own photographic development studio his photography was sometimes quite outstanding. L. P. Bucksell took many pictures over the years for the paper to accompany articles and found stories on his own as he traveled around the city and the state to help make the paper a viable institution for the African American Community.

Louis Bucksell brought along his son-in-law Emmanuel Gregoire, known to some as "Uncle Greggy", to work on the paper with his writings and "Uncle Greggy" did a great deal of the administrative work. Mr. Gregoire was a teacher and principal in the New Orleans Public School System and also wrote and helped manage the Louisiana Weekly for several years. Gregoire, Bucksell and Taylor spent years working without pay to move the paper along to help it find a substantial foundation.

C.C. Dejoie helped establish the newspaper with a $2,000 investment and used his business contacts to help spread the paper throughout the city. "Joseph “Scoop” Jones, who served as a Louisiana Weekly newsboy, reporter, columnist, and photographer, was considered to be one of the publication's earliest and most talented journalists." After C.C. Dejoie stepped down, his son Henry Sr. took over his father role as publisher of the newspaper in 1965. Henry Sr. left the newspaper because of Hurricane Katrina and was not able to return home before his death.

== Content ==
The Louisiana Weekly has been through multiple different stages of African-American history. The paper wrote about the violence towards black people during World War II. "One of the greatest accomplishments was a five-week series that ran in the paper claiming that defense training should be extended to public schools, which was implemented by the Superintendent of Schools after the series ran." The Louisiana Weekly covered issues such as: Brown v. The Board of Education, the Black Power Movement, the Black Panther Party for Self-Defense, Martin Luther King Jr., W.E.B. DuBois, and the 1963 March on Washington. The paper also covers current events that are happening in the black community. It covers the shooting and injustices in the African-American community. The Louisiana Weekly does not just cover injustices, the newspaper covers sports, business, education, health, tourist advice, and entertainment.

== Reputation ==
"The Weekly's emphasis was placed on local, national, and international events that had tremendous effects on us in our struggle as people,". The Louisiana Weekly had to move out of New Orleans, LA because of Hurricane Katrina and that caused a slip in the paper's reputation. The paper wrote mostly government blame articles after Hurricane Katrina. "The paper was hit hard by the storm, and many of their subscribers dispersed throughout the country, from Atlanta to Los Angeles and New York. Displaced readers have come to depend even more heavily on the Louisiana Weekly for accurate coverage of New Orleans current events." The paper has gone through a tough time since Hurricane Katrina, but The Louisiana Weekly is still seen as one of the most important sources of news in the black community.
