= Baie-de-Henne =

Baie-de-Henne Be de Hèn
- Commune
- Location in Haiti
- Coordinates: 19°40′0″N 73°12′0″W
- Country: Haiti
- Department: Nord-Ouest
- Arrondissement: Môle-Saint-Nicolas
- Elevation: 97 m (318 ft)

Population (7 August 2003)
  - Total: 17,277
- Time zone: UTC-05:00 (EST)
  - Summer (DST): UTC-04:00 (EDT)

Baie-de-Henne (French pronunciation: [bɛ də ɛn]; Haitian Creole: Be de Hèn) is a commune in the Môle-Saint-Nicolas Arrondissement, in the Nord-Ouest department of Haiti. It has 17,277 inhabitants.
