= Mercy (given name) =

Mercy is a feminine given name or nickname which may refer to:

- Mercy Abang, Nigerian journalist
- Mercy Aigbe Gentry (born 1979), Nigerian actress, director and businesswoman
- Mercy Akide (born 1975), Nigerian former footballer
- Mercy Chepkurui (born 2000), Kenyan steeplechase runner
- Mercy Chinwo (born 1990), Nigerian gospel musician, singer and songwriter
- Mercy Wanjiru Gitahi (born 1993), Kenyan steeplechase athlete
- Mercy Johnson (born 1984), Nigerian actress
- Mercy Joseph (born 1992), Kenyan badminton player
- Mercy Kuttan (born 1960), Indian former track and field athlete
- Mercy Lewis (c. 1675/75-17??), an accuser in the Salem Witch Trials
- Mercy Nyakundi (born 2005), Canadian wheelchair basketball player
- Mercy Oduyoye (born 1934), Ghanaian Methodist theologian
- Mercy Ravi (1945-2009), Indian politician, social worker and writer
- Mercy Dee Walton (1915–1962), American jump blues pianist, singer and songwriter
- Mercy Wanjiku (born 1986), Kenyan long-distance runner who specialises in the steeplechase
- Mercy Otis Warren (1727-1814), political writer and propagandist of the American Revolution
- Chifundo "Mercy" James, daughter of pop star Madonna
- Mercy Isbell, daughter of musicians Jason Isbell and Amanda Shires
