= Môle-Saint-Nicolas Arrondissement =

Môle-Saint-Nicolas Arrondissement Arrondissement de Môle-Saint-Nicolas Awondisman Mòl Sen Nikola
- Arrondissement
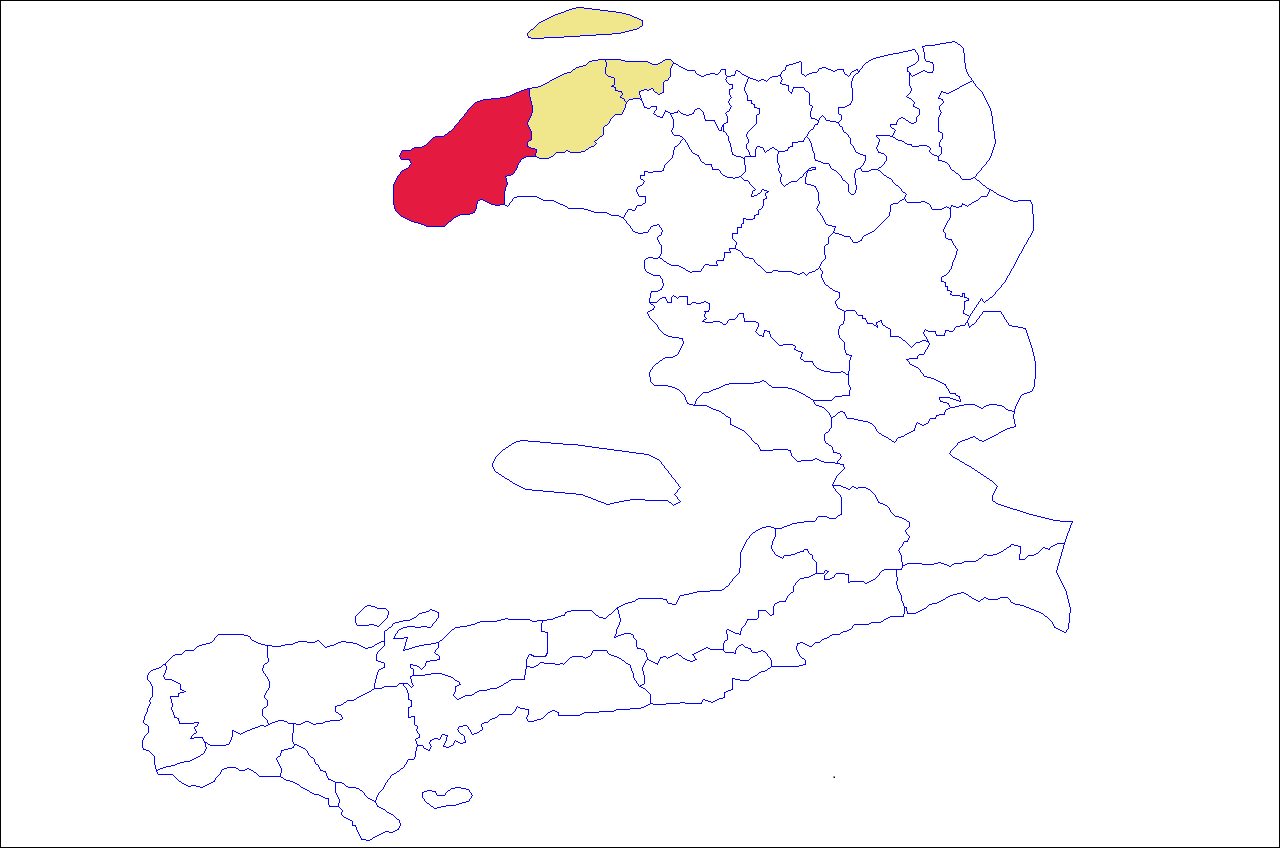
- Coordinates: 19.8°N 73.3833°W
- Country: Haiti
- Department: Nord-Ouest

Area
  - Arrondissement: 1,115.43 km^{2} (430.67 sq mi)
  - Urban: 3.4 km^{2} (1.3 sq mi)
  - Rural: 1,112.03 km^{2} (429.36 sq mi)

Population (2015)
  - Arrondissement: 245,590
  - Density: 220.18/km^{2} (570.25/sq mi)
  - Urban: 23,539
  - Rural: 222,051
- Time zone: UTC-5 (Eastern)
- Postal code: HT33—
- Communes: 4
- Communal Sections: 17
- IHSI Code: 093

Môle-Saint-Nicolas (Haitian Creole: Mòl Sen Nikola) is an arrondissement in the Nord-Ouest Department of Haiti. As of 2015, the population was 245,590 inhabitants. Postal codes in the Môle-Saint-Nicolas Arrondissement start with the number 33.

The arrondissement consists of the following communes:

- Môle Saint-Nicolas
- Baie-de-Henne
- Bombardopolis
- Jean-Rabel
