= Our Lady of Mercy High School =

Our Lady of Mercy High School or Our Lady of Mercy Catholic High School may refer to:

- Our Lady of Mercy Catholic High School (Georgia), Fayetteville, Georgia
- Our Lady of Mercy High School, former name of Our Lady of Mercy School for Young Women, Brighton, Monroe County, New York
- Our Lady of Mercy High School (Ohio), a former school in Cincinnati, Ohio
- Our Lady of Mercy Catholic High School (Micronesia), Federated States of Micronesia

== See also ==
- Mercy High School (disambiguation)
- Our Lady of Mercy Academy (disambiguation)
