= Saint-Louis-du-Nord =

Saint-Louis-du-Nord Sen Lwi dinò
- Commune
- Location in Haiti
- Coordinates: 19°56′0″N 72°43′0″W
- Country: Haiti
- Department: Nord-Ouest
- Arrondissement: Saint-Louis-du-Nord
- Elevation: 1 m (3.3 ft)

Population (7 August 2003)
  - Total: 69,592
- Time zone: UTC-05:00 (EST)
  - Summer (DST): UTC-04:00 (EDT)

Saint-Louis-du-Nord (French pronunciation: [sɛ̃ lwi dy nɔʁ]; Haitian Creole: Sen Lwi dinò) is a commune in the Saint-Louis-du-Nord Arrondissement, in the Nord-Ouest department of Haiti. It has 69,592 inhabitants.
