= Tortuga =

Tortuga Île de la Tortue Latòti
- Island
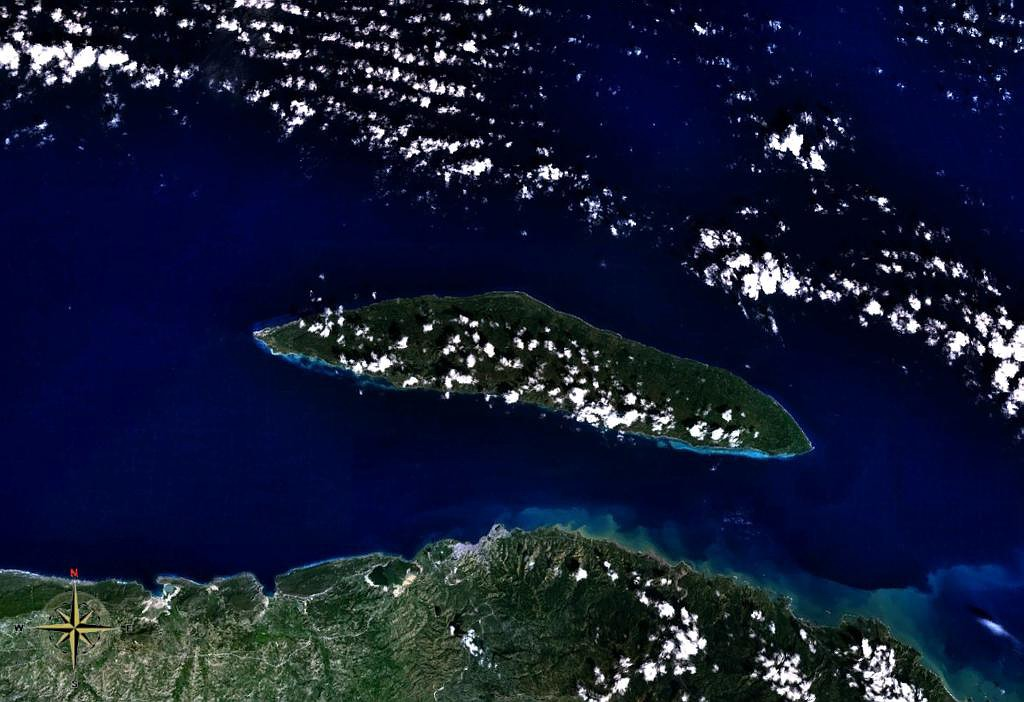
- Tortuga seen from space

- A map of Haiti with Île de la Tortue to the north.
- Coordinates: 20°02′23″N 72°47′24″W
- Country: Haiti
- Department: Nord-Ouest
- Arrondissement: Port-de-Paix
- Settled: 1625

Area
  - Total: 180 km^{2} (69 sq mi)
- Elevation: 459 m (1,506 ft)

Population (2003)
  - Total: 25,936
  - Density: 144/km^{2} (370/sq mi)
- Time zone: UTC-05:00 (EST)
  - Summer (DST): UTC-04:00 (EDT)
- Climate: Tropical Rainforest

Tortuga Island (French: Île de la Tortue, IPA: [il də la tɔʁty]; Haitian Creole: Latòti; Spanish: Isla Tortuga, IPA: [ˈisla toɾˈtuɣa], "Turtle Island") is a West Indian island off the northwest coast of Hispaniola, forming part of Haiti. It constitutes the commune of Île de la Tortue in the Port-de-Paix arrondissement of Haiti's Nord-Ouest department.

Tortuga is 180 square kilometres (69 square miles) in size and had a population of 25,936 at the 2003 census. In the 17th century, Tortuga was a major center and haven of Caribbean piracy. Its tourism industry and references in many works have made it one of the most recognized regions of Haiti.

== History ==
The first Europeans to land on Tortuga were the Spanish in 1492 during the first voyage of Christopher Columbus into the New World. On December 6, 1492, three Spanish ships entered the Windward Passage that separates Cuba and Haiti. At sunrise, Columbus noticed an island whose contours emerged from the morning mist. Because the shape reminded him of a turtle's shell, he chose the name of Tortuga.

Tortuga was originally settled by a few Spanish colonists under the Captaincy General of Santo Domingo. In 1625, French and English colonists from Saint Kitts arrived on the island of Tortuga after initially planning to settle on mainland Hispaniola. They were attacked in 1629 by Spanish forces commanded by Don Fadrique de Toledo, who expelled them before building a fort on the island and garrisoning it. As most of the garrison eventually left for Hispaniola to expel French colonists residing there, other French settlers returned in 1630, occupying and expanding the fort.

From 1630 onward, the island of Tortuga was divided into French and English colonies, allowing buccaneers to use the island as their main base of operations. In 1633, the first slaves were imported from Africa to aid in the plantations. However, by 1636 the use of slaves had ended. The slaves were said to be out of control on the island, while at the same time there had been continuous disagreements and fighting between French and English colonists on Tortuga.

In 1635, the Spanish expelled the French and English colonists from Tortuga before leaving. As more English and French settlers soon returned, the Spanish returned to expel them again, only to leave because the island was too small to be of major importance. This allowed the return of both French and English colonists. In 1638, the Spanish returned for a third time to secure their claim to the island and expel the French and Dutch settlers on Tortuga. They occupied the island, but were eventually expelled by the French and Dutch colonists in 1640, at which time the French built Fort de Rocher in a natural harbour; the fort enabled the French to defeat a Spanish invasion force the following year.

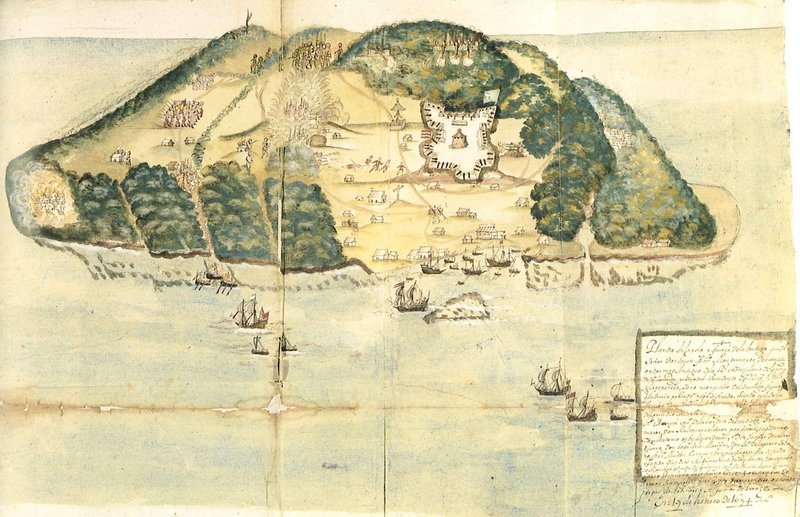
A drawing of Tortuga island from the 17th century.

By 1641, the buccaneers of Tortuga were calling themselves the Brethren of the Coast. The buccaneers population was mostly made up of French and Englishmen, along with a small number of Dutchmen. In 1654, the Spanish attacked the island for the fourth and last time, defeating a Franco-English force.

In 1655, Tortuga was settled again by English and French colonists under Elias Watts, who secured a commission from Col. William Brayne, the governor of Jamaica, to serve as governor of Tortuga. In 1664, French buccaneer Jeremie Dechamps sold the island for 15,000 livres to the French West India Company after having tried to sell it to the English for 6,000 pounds following an initial offer of 10,000 pounds by the French. In the same year, 400 French colonists came to Tortuga from Anjou, and they established Hispaniola's first sugar plantations since the first wave of European colonization. This group of colonists spread to the coast of the mainland and became the nexus of the French colony of Saint-Domingue.

By 1670, the buccaneer era was in decline, and many of the pirates turned to log cutting and wood trading as a new income source. At this time, Welsh privateer Henry Morgan started to promote himself and invited the pirates on the island of Tortuga to set sail under him. Morgan and some 2,000 privateers then attacked and sacked Panama the following year. They were hired by the French as a striking force that allowed France to have a much stronger hold on the Caribbean region. Consequently, the pirates never really controlled the island and kept Tortuga as a neutral hideout for pirate booty.

In 1680, the Parliament of England forbade English subjects to sail under foreign flags (in opposition to former practice). This was a major legal blow to the Caribbean pirates. Settlements were made in the Treaty of Ratisbon of 1684, signed by the European powers, that began to put an end to piracy. Most of the pirates after this time were hired by European powers to suppress their former buccaneer allies. The capital of Saint-Domingue had been moved from Tortuga to Port-de-Paix on the mainland of Hispaniola in 1676.

== Geography ==
Tortuga Lighthouse (east point)
- Location: Tortuga, Haiti
- Coordinates: 19°59′49″N 72°37′17″W

Tower
- Constructed: 1924
- Construction: concrete tower
- Height: 14 m (46 ft)
- Shape: tapered cylindrical tower with light
- Markings: white and red horizontal band tower

Light
- Focal height: 23.5 m (77 ft)
- Range: 14 nmi (26 km; 16 mi)
- Characteristic: Fl(2) W 6s

2026

The island of Tortuga stands off the northern coast of Haiti. It is very mountainous and rocky; the rocks are especially abundant on the northern part of the island. At the beginning of the 17th century, the population lived on the southern coast of the island, where there was a port for ships to enter. The northern shore was described as inaccessible via both land and sea.

The inhabited area was divided into four parts; the first of these was called "Low Land" or "Low Country". This region contained the island's port and was therefore considered the most important. The town was called Cayona, and the richest planters of the island lived there. The second region was called the "Middle Plantation"; the farmers of this region were unfamiliar with the soil and it was only used to grow tobacco. The third part was named "La Ringot", and was positioned on the western portion of the island. The fourth region was called the "La Montagne" (the Mountain); it is there that the first cultivated plantations were established upon the island.

This 17th century geography is known largely from Alexandre-Olivier Exquemelin's detailed description in his book Zeerovers, where he describes a 1666 journey to the island.

== In popular culture ==
The island is featured as a pirate haven in the Pirates of the Caribbean film series.

=== Rafael Sabatini's works ===
==== Captain Blood ====
Tortuga is featured in Rafael Sabatini's Captain Blood series and the movies based on it; the most famous is Captain Blood (1935) starring Errol Flynn. It is the place where Blood and his crew find refuge after their escape from Barbados in 1685. Blood receives a Letter of Marque from Tortuga's governor, D'Ogeron, and the island becomes his main base for the next four years. He starts his raids from Cayona, and several events in the books take place on Tortuga itself or on ships anchoring in the harbour of Cayona.

Sabatini used Exquemelin's History of the Bouccaneers of America as a main source for his description of Tortuga, and therefore the island is portrayed as a place where many buccaneers, prostitutes, and other dubious professions operate, but the French West India Company, which rules Tortuga, makes profit off of those affairs.

==== The Black Swan ====
Tortuga also features in Sabatini's novel The Black Swan and the 1942 movie based on it.

== Notable people ==
- Gabard Fénélon, professional football player
- Hugues Gentillon, film director, and founder of Yugy Pictures Entertainment

== See also ==
- List of islands of Haiti
- List of lighthouses in Haiti
- Geography of Pirates of the Caribbean
- Port Royal
- Tortuga (cocktail)
