= Ottavio Tiby =

Italian ethnomusicologist

Ottavio Tiby (1891-1955) Italian ethnomusicologist, was one of the pioneers of the scholarly study of Sicilian folk music.
