= Mercy, Haiti =

Mercy
- Village
- Location in Haiti
- Coordinates: 18.2638009°N 73.7822687°W
- Country: Haiti
- Department: Sud
- Arrondissement: Les Cayes
- Elevation: 55 m (180 ft)

Mercy (French pronunciation: [mɛʁsi]) is a village in the Les Cayes commune of the Les Cayes Arrondissement, in the Sud department of Haiti.
