= Bassin-Bleu =

Bassin-Bleu Basen Ble
- Commune
- Location in Haiti
- Coordinates: 19°47′0″N 72°48′0″W
- Country: Haiti
- Department: Nord-Ouest
- Arrondissement: Port-de-Paix
- Elevation: 198 m (650 ft)

Population (7 August 2003)
  - Total: 33,926
- Time zone: UTC-05:00 (EST)
  - Summer (DST): UTC-04:00 (EDT)

Bassin-Bleu (French pronunciation: [basɛ̃ blø]; Haitian Creole: Basen Ble) is a commune in the Port-de-Paix Arrondissement, in the Nord-Ouest department of Haiti. It has 33,926 inhabitants.

Bassin-Bleu is a home to a waterfall/pond also called Bassin-Bleu. They are a main tourist attraction. Bassin-Bleu in the Nord-Ouest department has a river running through it call Les Trois-Rivieres. The Bassin-Bleu with the waterfall is in the South of Haiti near the city of Jacmel.
