= Chansolme =

Chansolme Chansòl
- Commune
- Location in Haiti
- Coordinates: 19°53′0″N 72°50′0″W
- Country: Haiti
- Department: Nord-Ouest
- Arrondissement: Port-de-Paix
- Elevation: 273 m (896 ft)

Population (7 August 2003)
  - Total: 9,561
- Time zone: UTC-05:00 (EST)
  - Summer (DST): UTC-04:00 (EDT)
- Climate: Af

Chansolme (French pronunciation: [ʃɑ̃sɔlm]; Haitian Creole: Chansòl) is a commune in the Port-de-Paix Arrondissement, in the Nord-Ouest department of Haiti. It has 9,561 inhabitants.
