= C. C. Dejoie =

African-American businessman

Constant C. Dejoie Sr.
- Born: November 11, 1881; New Orleans, Louisiana
- Died: March 23, 1970 (aged 88)
- Occupations: Businessman and Publisher
- Known for: Founding The Louisiana Weekly newspaper

Constant "C. C." Dejoie Sr. (1881-1970) was a businessman and entrepreneur in New Orleans, Louisiana who co-founded The Louisiana Weekly newspaper. He was African-American.

== Biography ==
Dejoie was born on November 11, 1881, in New Orleans, Louisiana, to his parents Aristede Dejoie and Ellen Dejoie (née Chambers), a family of Creole heritage. Dejoie was educated in the New Orleans Public Schools and subsequently attended Southern University, graduating in 1898. He worked in various capacities in the New Orleans area, later joining the Unity Industrial Life Insurance Company which his father had founded. Dejoie served as business manager of the then-small enterprise.

In 1921, Dejoie became president of Unity Life, initiating a period of rapid expansion of its business. He expanded this insurance company by building branch offices throughout Louisiana and establishing a subsidiary company in the then rapidly growing metropolis of Chicago. The company suffered significantly during the Great Depression, and Dejoie carried the company through the economic downturn by focusing on whole life policies. Unity Life was philanthropic, having made donations to Flint-Goodridge Hospital and to the YMCA.

In August 1939, Dejoie was accused of conspiracy to murder his nephew Prudhomme John Earl Dejoie, in an incident that became known as the "Dejoie Affair". C.C. Dejoie was subsequently cleared of the allegation, while a friend and Unity Life employee Henry Wilcox was convicted. Late in the Great Depression, Dejoie sold his interests in Unity Life.

With former New Orleans public school teacher O.C.W. Taylor, Dejoie founded The Louisiana Weekly newspaper in 1925. The intent of the newspaper was to provide an outlet and a voice for the African-American community, a serious need in the Jim Crow South of the time. Dejoie and Taylor provided $2000 for initial financing, and they established its offices at the corner of Gravier St. and Saratoga St. (now Loyola Ave.) at the black-owned Pythian Temple Building. Its first publication was on September 19, 1925, published under the name The New Orleans Herald. However, it was renamed The Louisiana Weekly less than one month later. Taylor left The Louisiana Weekly after one year, leaving management of the enterprise entirely to Dejoie. In the early years of the publication, Dejoie made use of his business associates to sell the newspaper and to gather information for publication.

Dejoie died in 1970.

== Personal life ==
Dejoie married Vivian Baxter in 1914 with whom he subsequently had three children, Constant Charles Jr., Vivian (Mrs. John V. Roussell) and Henry Baxter. Dejoie's descendants, including Renette Dejoie-Hall, continued to serve in editorial capacities of The Louisiana Weekly at least until 2014.
