= Nord-Ouest (department) =

Department of Haiti

Coordinates: 19.95°N 72.8333°W

Nord-Ouest Nòdwès
- Department
- Nord-Ouest in Haiti
- Country: Haiti
- Capital: Port-de-Paix
- Région: Le Grand-Nord
- Symbole: 3 boats & 3 towers

Government
  - Type: Departmental Council

Area
  - Department: 2,102.88 km^{2} (811.93 sq mi)

Population (2015)
  - Department: 728,807
  - Density: 346.576/km^{2} (897.627/sq mi)
  - Urban: 203,568
  - Rural: 525,239
- Time zone: UTC-05:00 (EST)
  - Summer (DST): UTC-04:00 (EDT)
- ISO 3166 code: HT-NO
- HDI (2022): 0.527 low · 3rd

Nord-Ouest (French, pronounced [nɔʁwɛst]) or Nòdwès (Haitian Creole; both meaning "North West") is one of the ten departments of Haiti as well as the northernmost one. It has an area of 2,102.88 km^{2} (811.93 sq mi) and a population of 728,807 (2015 Census). Its capital is Port-de-Paix.

== Department ==
There is a proposal for the department to become 2 departments, Nord-Ouest and Bas-Nordouest (Môle-St-Nicolas) with the Horn-of-Artibonite.

== History ==
=== Taino Period ===
The region of the Great North of Haiti was under the administration of the Marien casicazgo, the Taino-chief Guacanagarix was the one to have received Christopher Columbus on his first voyage to Hispaniola. Columbus explained how the Taino chief offers him safe harbor after one of his boats sunk. Columbus described the place has Paradise Valley or Valparaiso and named the island La Isla Española. This department specifically the town of Mole-Saint-Nicolas is believed to be the first place on the island to have received a Christian cross.

The Island of Tortuga was part of the Taino dominion under the name of Baynei.

=== French Period ===
The Spaniards lost interest in the western part of the island leaving it vacant for French, Dutch and British pirates, and buccaneers, making Tortuga one of the biggest pirates hubs in the Caribbean. Under the French administration, the Nord-Ouest was part of the Ouest department and many French Governors governed the island from Le Môle.

=== Haitian Revolution ===
Early on the N-O departement was a strategic point for Toussaint Louverture, one of the first diplomatic and pre-independence treaty signed between the Indigènes and the British was signed by Toussaint and British Officer Maitland and thus the Indigènes took controlled of the part of Saint-Domingue that was under British rules. After Napoléon sent his troop to capture the Toussaint and put them under French slavery, the Haitian Officer Maurepas under the order of Toussaint burned down the city of Port-de-Paix and went uphill to Les Trois Pavillons fort. Maurepas was later on captured by the French and they drowned him in the Bay of Cap-Haitian.

Francois Lamort Cappois and the 9th demi-brigade freed the city of Port-de-Paix and later on the island of Tortuga on April 12, 1803. Le Mole officially became under Haitian control 10 days after the Battle of Vertières with the help of Vincent Pourcely colonel in the 9th demi-brigade.

=== Haitian Period ===
Cappoix-Lamort commander of Port-de-Paix is a signatory of the Haitian Declaration of Independence. Francois Cappoix the brilliant and vaillaint Haitian officers was trapped by Henry 1st men and assassinated in Limonade. The department was in open rebellion with the Crown. Pétion in the West who needed ally after the rebellion of Rigaud in the South and Goman in the Grand'Anse, sent troops to support the N-O. Henry 1st crushed the rebellion and granted amnitice to the rebelled troops.

The town of Môle Saint-Nicolas is located in the Nord-Ouest. Ever since Columbus landed here in 1492 and named the island Hispaniola, Môle St-Nicolas has been of interest to the colonials, including the British, Spanish, French, and the Americans due to its strategic location on the Windward Passage, just miles from Cuba.

The Mole-St-Nicolas affair was a diplomatic incident between the Haitians and the Americans because the Americans wanted a safe harbor to control the Winward Passage after the construction of the Panama Canal. The Haitian intellectual Anténor Firmin was remarkable in that affair.

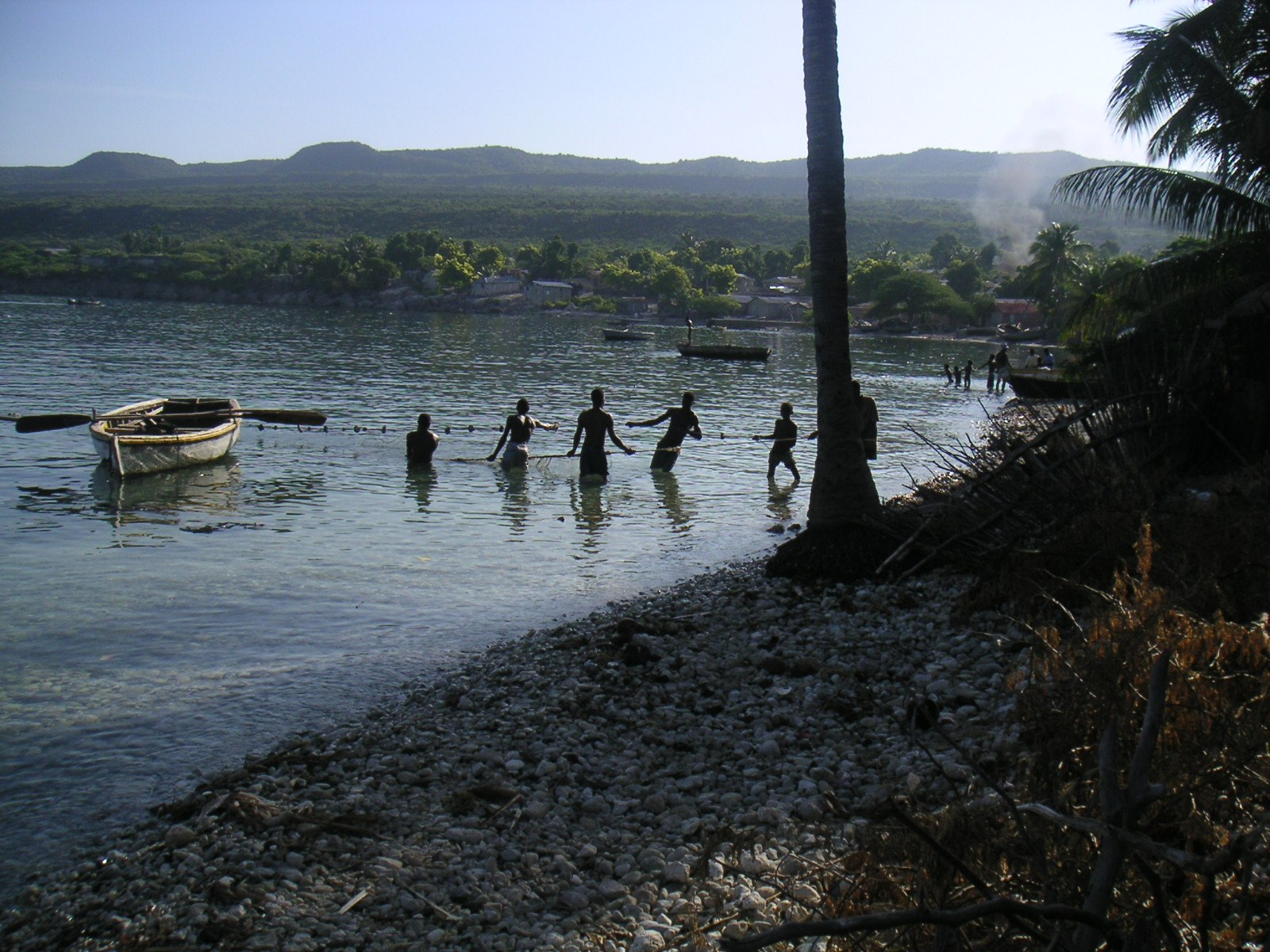
Môle-Saint-Nicolas

Sometime during the 19th century, it was created out of the Nord and Ouest departments.

== Geography ==
The department is bordered to the north by Cuba, Bahamas, and Florida, and has direct access to the Atlantic through the Tortuga Canal, on the west the Windward Passage, the south Gulf of Gonave and Artibonite Department and the east and North Department.

At the western tip of the department, the Mole Peninsula protects the city of the same name.

With the exception of Tortuga Island (La Tortue) and the coastal area near Port-de-Paix, the northwest is mostly arid and barren. In fact, the department has Haiti's second biggest satellite island under its administrative control, located less than 10 km offshore.

At Les Palmiste on the eastern coast visit a pre-Columbian rock carving presumed to be of native Taino origin of a goddess at La Grotte au Bassin exists.

Due to a lack of water management, the Trois-Rivières often flood the city of Port-de-Paix during the rainy season located on its east shore. On the west shore of the river, there is a lagoon.

== Economy ==
=== Agriculture ===
Port-de-Paix, which was once a large exporter of coffee and bananas, now imports goods and produce from Miami. The Bombardopolis Plateau is another area of sustainable potential for industry, tourism, ecological reserve, and agriculture. Salt production is a major industry in the area.

=== Tourism ===
Tortuga island, once the biggest pirate base in the Caribbean is a popular tourist site and is represented frequently in films and movies based on piracy. Named for the smooth shape that reminded Christopher Columbus of a turtle's shell, Tortuga's best beach is Pointe Saline at the western tip of the small island.

There are several ruined forts along the coast. On clear nights the Guantánamo Province of Cuba can be seen. This area is dry and offers little shade but has a beautiful shoreline.

Port-à-L'Écu is the point of interest in leisure tourism.

== Environment ==
It is one of Haiti's dryest areas, the N-O still offers a unique scenery in Haitian tourist and ecological package. The Canal and the Tortuga island are more or less well preserved although they need to be reinforced. Although not having a major plain the Trois-Rivières (Three Rivers), the second longest river after Artibonite offers a productive watershed and valley.

== Transport ==
The department has long been isolated from Port-au-Prince, gaining it the nickname of Far-West. The RN5 now connects Gonayiv to Gros-Morne and Port-de-Paix. the RN6 from Ouanaminthes to Cap-Haitian is to be continued until Port-de-Paix.

Port-de-Paix is the second biggest port on the Haitian Atlantic coast.

Port-de-Paix has its own airport.

The mountains overlooking the city of Port-de-Paix have great potential for wind energy.

== Culture ==
The N-O has two of Haiti's major lakoun-Vodoun or Vodoun Yard such as lakoun Vilokan, probably the first lakoun in Bohio since early Spanish colonial time, and lakoun-Grann-Sent-Àn in Anse-à-Foleur.

== Administrative divisions ==
The Department of Nord-Ouest is subdivided into three arrondissements, which are further subdivided into ten communes.

- Môle Saint Nicholas Arrondissement
  - Baie de Henne
  - Bombardopolis
  - Jean-Rabel
  - Môle Saint Nicholas
- Port-de-Paix Arrondissement
  - Bassin Bleu
  - Chansolme
  - La Tortue
  - Port-de-Paix
- Saint-Louis du Nord Arrondissement
  - Anse-à-Foleur
  - Saint-Louis du Nord
