= Saint-Marc =

Saint-Marc Amani-Y (Arawakan Name), Sen Mak (Haitian Creole)
- Commune
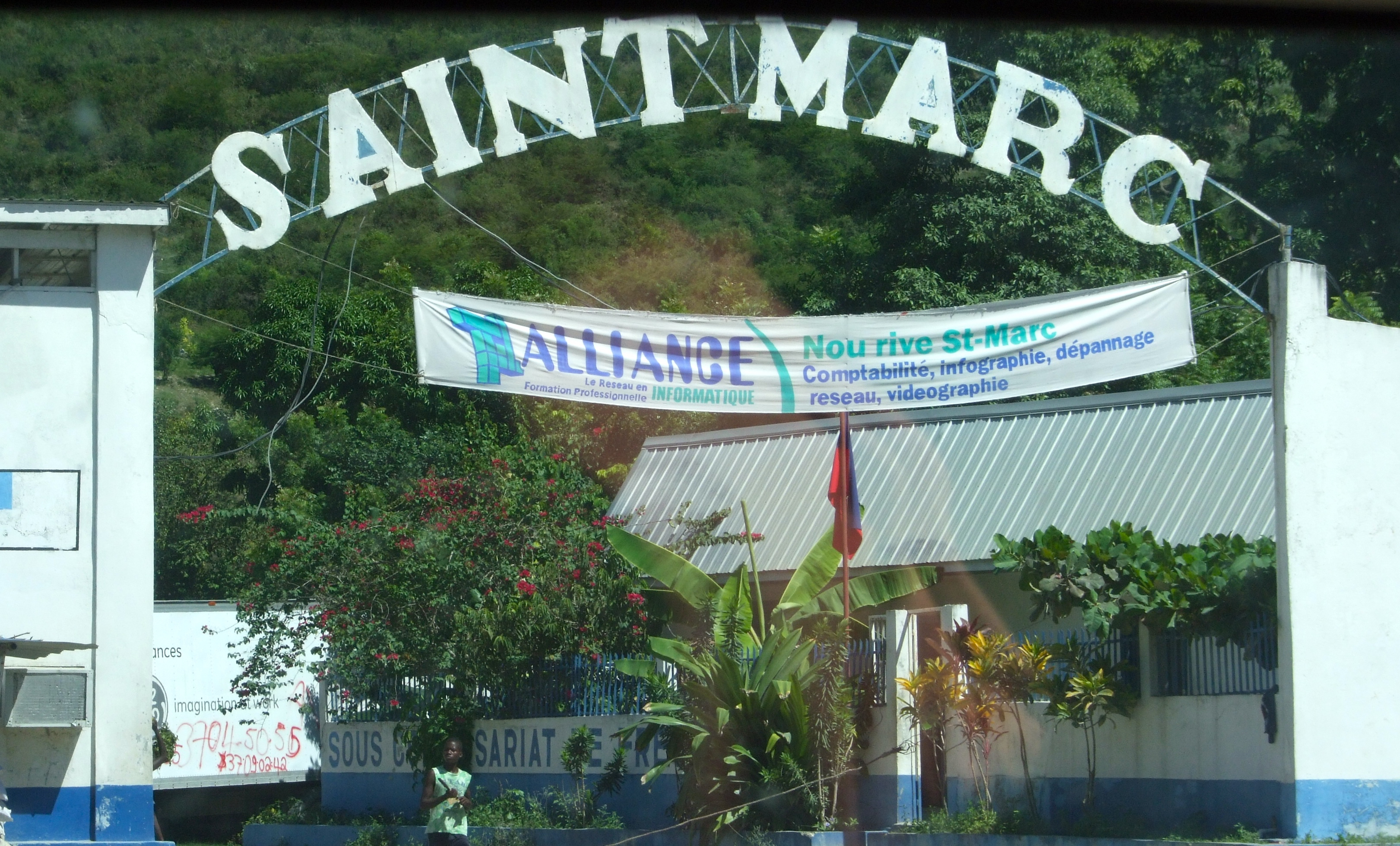
- Interactive map of Saint-Marc
- Location in Haiti
- Coordinates: 19°7′0″N 72°42′0″W
- Country: Haiti
- Department: Artibonite
- Commune: Saint-Marc
- Settled: 1716

Population (2015)
  - Total: 266,642
- Time zone: UTC−05:00 (EST)
  - Summer (DST): UTC−04:00 (EDT)
- Postal code: HT 4310
- Climate: BSh

Saint-Marc (French pronunciation: [sɛ̃ maʁk]; Haitian Creole: Sen Mak) is a commune in western Haiti in Artibonite departement. Its geographic coordinates are 19°7′N 72°42′W. At the 2015 Census the commune had 266,642 inhabitants. It is one of the biggest cities, second to Gonaïves, between Port-au-Prince and Cap-Haïtien.

Before the settlement of the French, the region was known as Amani-y ad part of the Xaragua caciquat.

The port of Saint-Marc is currently the preferred port of entry for consumer goods coming into Haiti. Reasons for this may include its location away from volatile and congested Port-au-Prince as well as its central location relative to a large group of Haitian cities including Cap-Haïtien, Carrefour, Delmas, Fort-Liberté, Gonaïves, Hinche, Limbe, Pétion-Ville, Port-de-Paix, and Verrettes. These cities, together with their surrounding areas, contain nearly eight million of Haiti's ten million people (2009).

In 1905 the Compagnie Nationale or National Railroad built a 100 km railroad north to Saint-Marc from the national capital of Port-au-Prince. The track was later extended another 30 km east to Verrettes.

== Overview ==
St. Marc is a large port town surrounded by mountains. At all times, there are many boats in the port, typically sail boats. The town was first settled in 1716, then located in the French colony of Saint-Domingue.

The town is located on flat land close to the sea but its edges extend into the foothills. From these vantage points, the ocean is sometimes viewable. The city has a few parks, including Place Cite Nissage Saget. These parks are often populated by vendors.

St. Marc is generally considered to be a safe place to live. About 60% of the population lives in the communal section, meaning outside of town. As a result, they are beyond its infrastructure and lack drainage systems, electricity and potable water.

Recent development projects have been underway in St. Marc, with assistance and funding from USAID and IOM. They include: grading and paving roads, implementing a sewage/drainage system and providing access to potable water at various points throughout the larger town. In addition, a USAID project trained youth to map the town on OpenStreetMap, a free, editable online map.

== Transportation ==
Pointe de Saint-Marc Lighthouse
- Location: Pointe de Saint-Marc, Artibonite, Haiti
- Coordinates: 19°02′45″N 72°49′13″W

Tower
- Constructed: 1924
- Construction: concrete (foundation), metal (tower)
- Height: 12 m (39 ft)
- Shape: square pyramid
- Markings: White (tower)
- Power source: solar power

Light
- Focal height: 29 m (95 ft)
- Range: 9 nmi (17 km; 10 mi)
- Characteristic: QF(9) W 15s

There is a metal skeleton lighthouse located on Pointe de Saint-Marc, which was built in 1924.

The way to get from the capital of Port-au-Prince through St. Marc is by means of Route Nationale # 1 (Haiti Highway 1), which extends all the way up to the coastal towns of Montrouis and Gonaïves, before reaching its terminus at the northern port of Cap-Haïtien.

The most prevalent mode of transportation is the motorcycle (mobylette), due to the inexpensive maintenance and low gas consumption. Generally, people fit as many as four on a bike even though the mobylettes are designed for a maximum of two people. Bikes are another common source of transport. Cars are considered a luxury mode of transportation.

St. Marc is known for being a blend of city and rural lifestyles. For many living in Port-au-Prince, it is considered the start of the “country”. Goats are rampant and can be seen roaming about the city streets. Many people in St. Marc also own cows or chickens.

== Culture ==
=== People ===
St. Marc is generally known for the hospitality of its residents, and comedy is popular pastime. Although St. Marc is known as the “pleasure city” as many young people reside here; the majority of people live in abject poverty.

=== Music ===
There are three main types of music listened to in St. Marc:

- Troubadou or twoubadou is very similar to Salsa music and includes drums, trumpets, and guitar.
- Haitian folk music is strongly associated with Vodou. It is often played as processional music in the streets between Ash Wednesday and Easter Sunday.

Popular Haitian groups have developed over the years. RapCreole is an emerging popular style among the youth. Typically this kind of rap uses rhythms typical of Haitian folk or popular music. Zomò is one of the most popular singer at Saint-Marc. In 2014, he was featured in a song called Life goes on, which was called one of Haiti's best songs.

=== Food ===
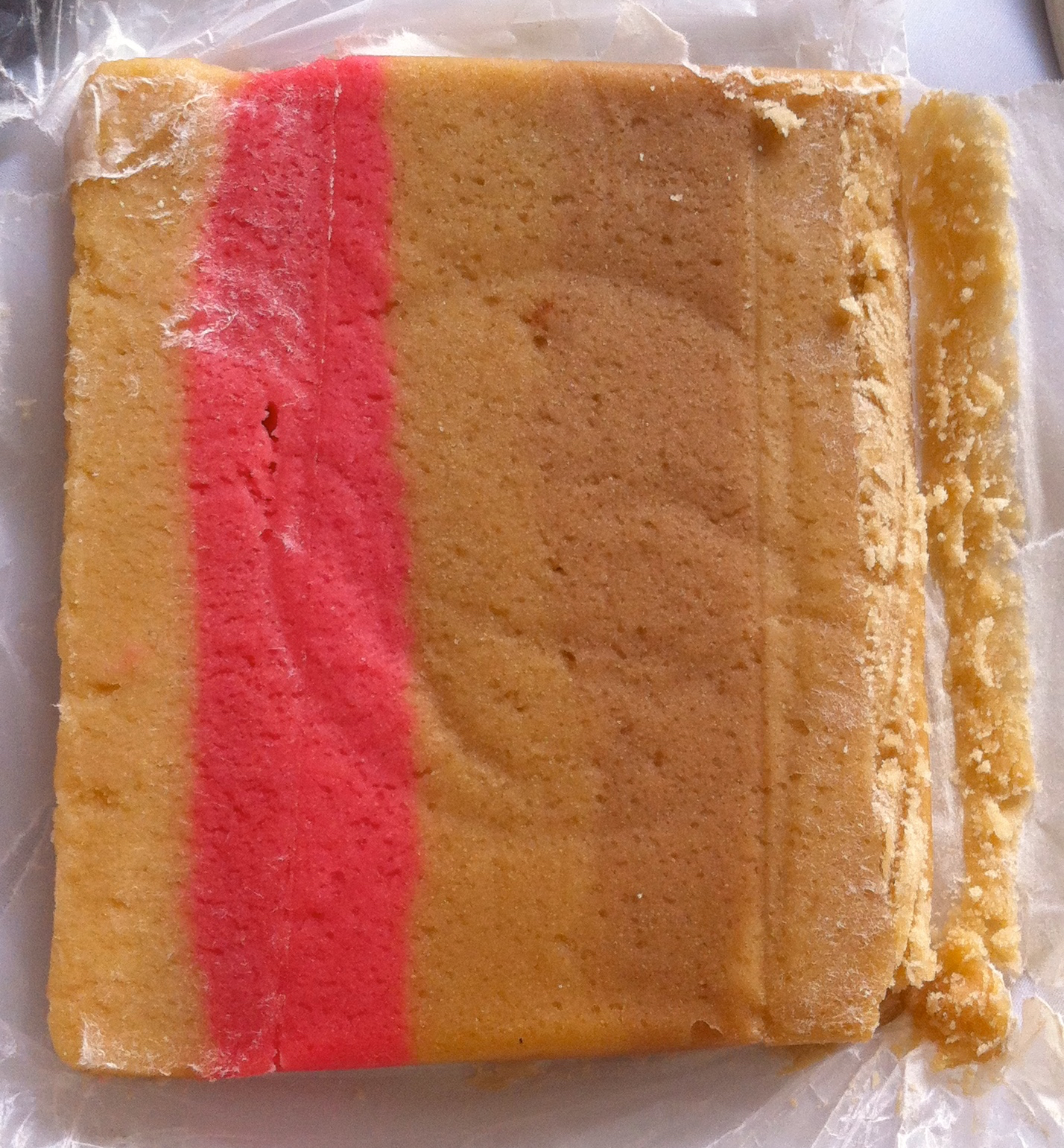
Dous Makos (Haitian Fudge)

Food plays a large role in the life of people in St. Marc. Meals are an important part of normal daily social interaction. For the most part, cooking is done outside to avoid overheating and moisture collection inside.

Plantains, rice or pasta are staples of almost every meal. Seafood is also consumed regularly. For instance, crab, dried cod and fresh fish are available.

Goat is perhaps the most common meat, but chicken and beef are also consumed regularly. Spices and spicy peppers are used abundantly in Haitian cuisine, along with sugar.

A significant amount of produce is grown locally, specifically bananas, plantains, mangoes, cherries, corn, manioc, rice, and tomatoes. The typical St. Marc resident consumes a lot of fruit. A dish very specific to St. Marc consists of white rice with, beans sauce, and crab/goat meat mixed in, or both stuffed in lavish edible leaves named "Lalo" in Haitian Creole. "Lalo" is also significantly produced in Artibonite. Other dishes include bananne pesée (fried plantains, called "bannann peze" in Haitian Creole) which are accompanied with pikliz, a spicy slaw mixture that consists of finely sliced carrots, cabbage, onions or shallots, and peppers.

Pumpkin soup ("soup joumou" in Haitian Creole) is typically prepared on Sunday morning, the day dedicated to rest and devotion, as a weekly remembrance of the end of enslavement. It usually consists of several types of meat, potatoes, and carrots. Fresh fish, typically sole, is also consumed regularly. This fish is cooked over an open fire with a mayonnaise-based marinade mixed with various spices.

″Riz au lait″ is a common dessert, essentially a rice pudding made with cinnamon, milk, sugar, and butter. Other Creole-named desserts include dous makos (Haitian fudge), dous kokoye (homemade coconut candy), pen patat (sweet potato bread), pen diri (rice bread), etc.

=== Religion ===
Religious believers follow mostly Catholicism and Haitian Vodou. Both are prevalent throughout the country. Catholicism/Christianity is the most widespread and generally accepted religion in St. Marc. Most Haitians attend church on Sundays. Roman Catholicism was brought by the French colonists who settled Saint-Domingue; missionary priests and others worked to convert enslaved Africans. Some 60% of Haitians are practicing Catholics, sometimes combining it with elements of Vodou. Evangelical Protestant and Baptist churches are also common in St. Marc. The majority of residents are very involved in their church as centers of community and cultural identity.

Vodou developed from combining of the different West African religions brought by slaves; the word Vodou is derived from an African word meaning spirit. It is the most widely practiced and considered the official religion of Haiti. Although a few devout Catholics denounce it, the majority of Haitians practice both religions simultaneously. Catholicism is syncretic and has absorbed elements of Vodou. The latter is often referred to for explaining and treating illness. Vodou is more strongly rooted in the rural areas, and this population is more reluctant to accept Western medicine.

=== Sports ===
Saint Marc currently has two soccer teams playing in the Haitian professional football league Ligue Haïtienne.

Baltimore Sportif Club and Tempête Football Club

== Economy ==
Commerce is the largest trade in St. Marc. Many find work as a merchant, either with their own stand in the market or at a boutique “convenient store” stand. There are also a multitude of street sellers who carry baskets of goods or candy on their heads, as well as selling canned milk to passers-by. Not many of these products are manufactured in St. Marc.

Nearly all products sold are received in the country as donations or surpluses from second-hand stores in the US. St. Marc markets are open daily, featuring almost any type of fruit or vegetable grown locally. St. Marc hosts a charcoal market for cooking material. As charcoal is used for much of the cooking in St. Marc and throughout Haiti in general, it is manufactured locally and supports a large work force. The island has become deforested from so much wood being taken from the forests.

Aside from the charcoal market, St. Marc's economics revolve a great deal around agricultural products produced in the area. In Deye Legliz, an area near St. Marc harbor, food markets are open daily. Most residents shop on Saturday to stock up on food supplies for the week.

The Boulevard area houses a large flea market, with a variety of mostly second-hand items sold, including clothing, electronic equipment, shoes, toys, bicycles, etc. Many people from Port-au-Prince come to the markets in St. Marc because of the inexpensive costs.

=== Shopping ===
Retail bricks and mortar (or wooden) stores also exist in St. Marc. These include: pharmacies that sell medicinal products, open-air markets (marché) that sell food and many other types of goods, bakeries with wheat and cassava bread and various sweet baked goods, convenience stores, and magasins or specialty shops for such items as fabric, hardware, beauty salons and car parts.

== Demographics ==
According to ARCHIVE Research: In general, people from St. Marc are classified as a Middle class and a Lower Class (the poverty class). The former is generally literate in French, while the latter use Creole and may not be literate. Many of the better schools teach both French and English as formal languages, resulting in children gaining fluency in those and Creole, their first language.

Residents aspire to having a concrete masonry house (CMU), associated with security and wealth. Middle-class families may also wish to save enough money to emigrate with their children from the struggling country. Some observers think the struggle for survival for most families works against joint goals for the city and nation.

== Climate ==
Saint-Marc has a tropical savanna climate (Köppen: Aw).

Climate data for Saint-Marc
Month	Jan	Feb	Mar	Apr	May	Jun	Jul	Aug	Sep	Oct	Nov	Dec	Year
Mean daily maximum °C (°F)	26.7 (80.1)	26.7 (80.1)	26.8 (80.2)	27.3 (81.1)	28.0 (82.4)	29.0 (84.2)	29.2 (84.6)	29.2 (84.6)	28.9 (84.0)	28.4 (83.1)	27.8 (82.0)	27.3 (81.1)	27.9 (82.3)
Daily mean °C (°F)	24.7 (76.5)	24.8 (76.6)	25.0 (77.0)	25.6 (78.1)	26.4 (79.5)	27.1 (80.8)	27.5 (81.5)	27.6 (81.7)	27.3 (81.1)	26.8 (80.2)	26.0 (78.8)	25.3 (77.5)	26.2 (79.1)
Mean daily minimum °C (°F)	22.6 (72.7)	22.8 (73.0)	23.1 (73.6)	23.8 (74.8)	24.8 (76.6)	25.6 (78.1)	25.9 (78.6)	26.1 (79.0)	25.8 (78.4)	25.4 (77.7)	24.3 (75.7)	23.4 (74.1)	24.5 (76.0)
Average precipitation mm (inches)	6.7 (0.26)	6.4 (0.25)	11.6 (0.46)	24.7 (0.97)	32.0 (1.26)	36.2 (1.43)	51.3 (2.02)	65.1 (2.56)	54.9 (2.16)	51.7 (2.04)	29.0 (1.14)	11.0 (0.43)	380.6 (14.98)
Source: Weather.Directory

== Attractions ==
Going to the beach is a popular activity for families and friends on the weekend. The most popular time to go is on Sunday after church. The most important beaches in St. Marc are Grosse Roche and Amani-y.

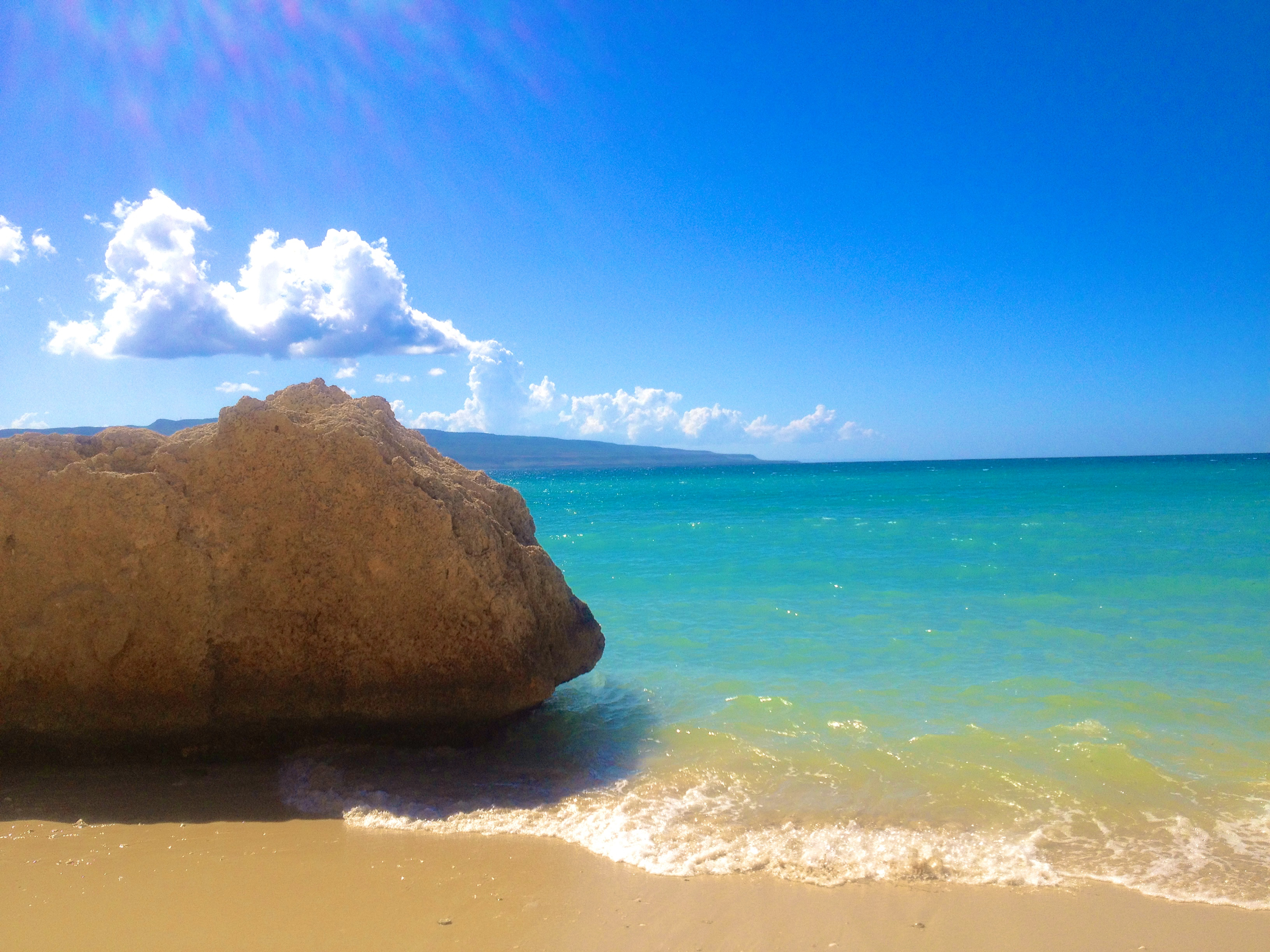
Grosse Roche Beach in Saint-Marc, Haiti

Amani-y beach is a white sandy beach. It was abandoned for more than 25 years before being acquired by the current developer. It is the site of a noted "Zombie hole", a 200-meters-deep reef that features large "Elephant Ears" fan coral, sponge tubes, black coral, blue tang, sea urchins, and many more.

Near the beach are some of the region's noted historical sites, such as: the Palace with 365 doors and 52 windows in Petite Rivière de l'Artibonite; the forts in Marchand Dessalines; the pilgrimage site of Saut d’Eau; and the port of Saint-Marc.

An experienced diver has described the diving at Amani-y as follows:

The diving at Amani-y is remarkable and unique. On the east end of the beach, walking out to chest -high water brings you to a dramatic drop-off, a wall going down hundreds of meters. At about 120 feet, a series of giant sponges begins. Making this dive easy is the fact that to the immediate west, a gradual slope takes you up to 30 feet, then 15-20, then ten feet or less, so decompression can be done in a very exciting and relaxing way. The shallower water is perfect snorkeling for non-divers.

== Media ==
=== FM Radio ===
- Radio Saint-Marc (4VLF) - Saint-Marc music (local), news
- 104.5 FM Stereo 3.0 kW Radio Max FM - Saint-Marc (Portail des Guêpes)
- 99.1 - RTC-Radio Tele Caleb - Saint-Marc
- 99.9 - Radio Vision 2000 - Saint-Marc
- 101.3 1 kW Radio Super Gemini - Saint-Marc
- 102.9 - Radio Tète a Tète - Saint-Marc
- 104.5 - Radio Max FM - Saint-Marc
- 105.7 500W Radio Delta Stereo - Saint-Marc
- (FM) - Radio Sonic Plus - Saint-Marc
- 105.5 Radio Megalexis
- 97.9 500w Radio L'Union Stéréo-Saint-Marc

== Notable people ==
- Jean Baptiste Point du Sable (before 1750): First permanent non-Indigenous settler of what would later become Chicago, Illinois, and is recognized as the "Founder of Chicago"
- Pierre Toussaint (d. 1853): Former slave, famous hairdresser and philanthropist in New York, and Catholic venerable
- Nissage Saget (1810–1880): Tenth president of Haiti. The first Haitian president to serve out his term of office (1869–1874) and retire voluntarily
- Marc Louis Bazin (1932–2010): Minister of Finance and Economy, fourth Prime Minister of Haiti and provisional President of Haiti
- Garcelle Beauvais (1966–): Haitian-American actress, television personality, author, and former fashion model.
- Ricardo Adé (1990–): Haitian international footballer, winner of Copa Sudamericana in 2023

== Sister cities ==
- Lake Worth Beach, Florida
- Savannah, Georgia

== See also ==
- List of lighthouses in Haiti
