= Dessalines =

Dessalines Desalin
- Commune
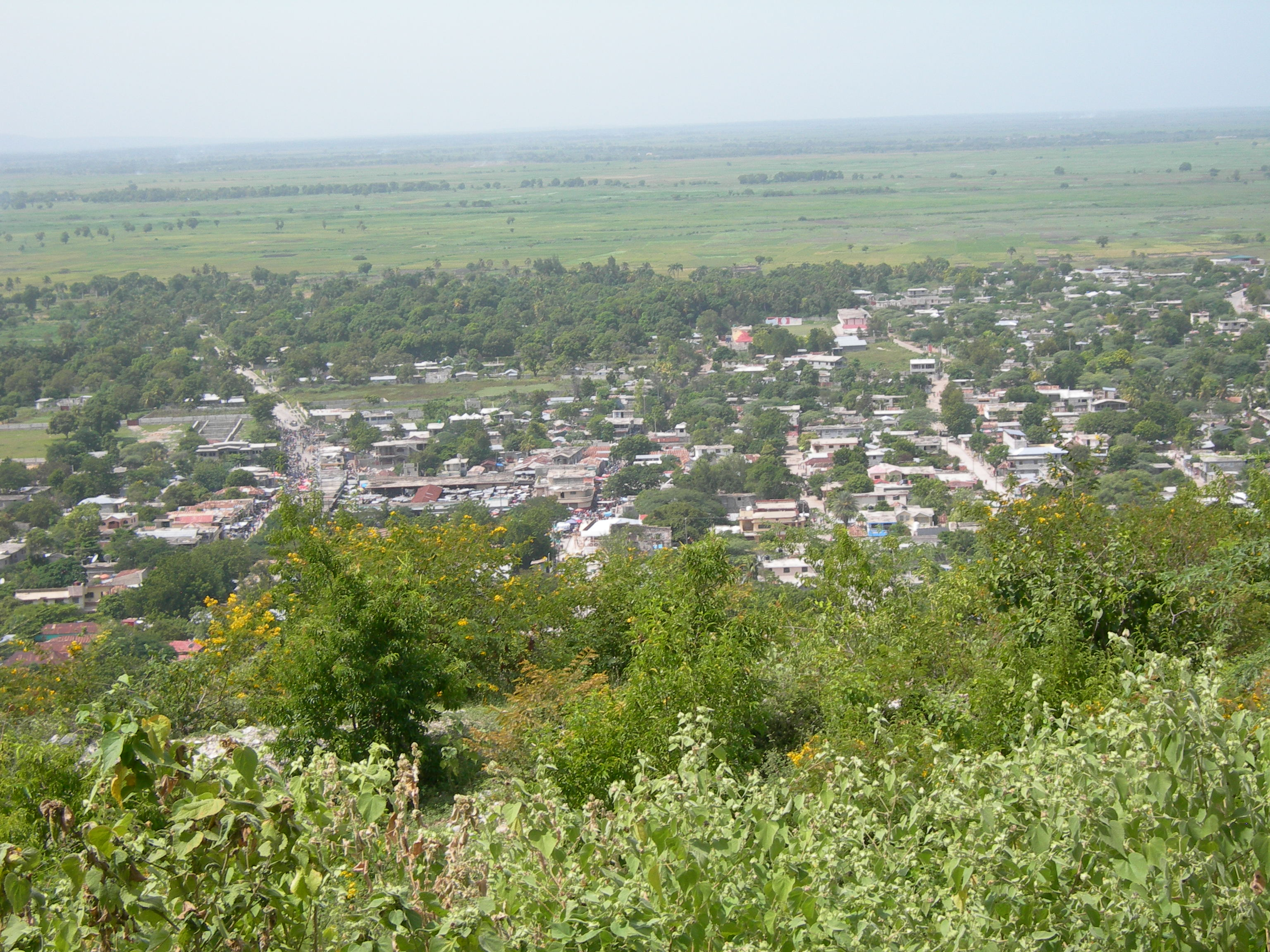
- Interactive map of Dessalines
- Location in Haiti
- Coordinates: 19°17′0″N 72°30′0″W
- Country: Haiti
- Department: Artibonite
- Arrondissement: Dessalines

Area
  - Total: 474.29 km^{2} (183.12 sq mi)

Population (2015)
  - Total: 181,903
  - Density: 383.53/km^{2} (993.33/sq mi)
- Time zone: UTC−05:00 (EST)
  - Summer (DST): UTC−04:00 (EDT)
- Postal code: HT 4410

Dessalines (French pronunciation: [dɛsalin]; Haitian Creole: Desalin) usually referred to as Marchand-Dessalines (Haitian Creole: Machan Desalin), is a commune in the Artibonite department of Haiti. It is named after Jean-Jacques Dessalines, a leader of the Haitian Revolution and the first ruler and emperor of independent Haiti.

== History ==
=== French period ===
During that period L'Éstère city was a major city in the Artibonite Valley. Marchand at that time was a habitation probably belonging to a French name Marchand.

=== Haitian Period ===
During the Haitian revolution, Dessalines organized most of his troops from the town of Petite Riviere de Artibonite. Dessalines asked Pétion to lay a plan for a new city that would become the capital of free Haiti over the habitation Marchand. In 1804 the town was made the capital of the newly independent state of Haiti. It was renamed after Jean-Jacques Dessalines in honor of the first Haitian head of state. The imperial constitution of 20 May 1805 was proclaimed from the town of Dessalines. After the emperor's assassination in October 1806 Port-au-Prince was declared the new capital of Haiti.

== Geography ==
The commune lay in the Artibonite Valley, on the north shore of the river at the bottom of the Montagne Noir mountain range. The major river of the commune is the Estère river.

== Economy ==
=== Agriculture ===
Like much of the valley Dessalines' main economical hub is agriculture mainly rice cultivation.

=== Tourism ===
Dessalines have great potential for historical and cultural tourism.

== Historical Places ==
- Fort Fin-du-Monde
- Fort Madame
- Fort Doco
- Fort Innocent
- Fort Culbuté
- Fort Décidé
- Kayloa Dessalines
- Bassin Félicité
