= Liancourt, Haiti =

Liancourt
- Commune

- Location in Haiti
- Coordinates: 19°08′00″N 72°32′00″W
- Country: Haiti
- Department: Artibonite
- Arrondissement: Saint-Marc

Population (2015 est.)
  - Total: 18,574
- Demonym: Liancourtois(e)
- Time zone: UTC−05:00 (EST)
  - Summer (DST): UTC−04:00 (EDT)

Liancourt (French pronunciation: [ljɑ̃kuʁ]) is a commune in the Saint-Marc Arrondissement, in the Artibonite department of Haiti. Once a communal section of Verrettes, a presidential decree on 22 July 2015 made it a commune.

Liancourt is located in the Artibonite Department of Haiti. Historically, it functioned as the first communal section of the Commune of Verrettes, serving as an agricultural and economic hub for the surrounding region.

In 2015, Liancourt was formally elevated to the status of a Commune—an acknowledgment of its growth, its people's resilience, and its longstanding role in making the Artibonite Department one of the most dynamic in the country. This recognition marked an important milestone in Liancourt's history.

However, the Government of Haiti has not invested in the infrastructure, development, or administrative support necessary to accompany Liancourt's new status.

The Artibonite Valley surrounding Liancourt is home to rice, corn, plantains, mangoes, bananas, sweet potatoes, sugarcane production, and small-scale farming operations that feed families across the country. Agriculture life is passed down through generations.

Energy Infrastructure: Hydroelectric Power Station

The Liancourt Hydroelectric Station, located in the Liancourt–Drouet area of the of Commune of Liancourt from Artibonite Valley, is one of Haiti's most significant energy infrastructures. Built in the early 1980s, it is recognized as Electricité d'Haïti's second‑largest hydroelectric plant, originally designed with a capacity of 3 MW. Over time, aging equipment reduced its operational reliability, prompting a major rehabilitation initiative beginning in 2015 and continuing through 2021. This modernization included the installation of new electromechanical systems, upgraded turbines, and structural improvements aimed at restoring full production capacity and increasing renewable energy output. Government reports confirm that once fully operational, the Drouet station is intended to supply electricity to several key localities: Pont‑Sondé, Liancourt, Petite‑Rivière de l'Artibonite, Verrettes, Deschapelles, and Saint‑Marc, strengthening the energy backbone of the entire lower Artibonite region. The rehabilitation was financed in part by the World Bank, reflecting its strategic importance for regional development and agricultural modernization.

National Beverage Manufacturer: Bralia Elite Enterprises of Liancourt

Bralia Elite Enterprises represents one of Liancourt's most significant contemporary industries — a locally rooted manufacturing and beverage company serving the entire Artibonite region. Drawing purified water from Liancourt's aquifers, Bralia produces a diverse portfolio of products including Caribbean‑inspired sodas, juices, artisanal rum, and its flagship Elite Ice, a staple throughout the region. With its main facility located in Liancourt, Bralia functions as both a major employer and a symbol of local economic vitality. The company showcases Liancourt's capacity for quality production, regional distribution, and industrial reliability. Its presence reinforces the commune's potential to grow into a broader manufacturing center, especially as future development aligns with the energy infrastructure already established by the hydroelectric station. Visit Elite @ https://www.braliaonline.com/
