= Grande-Saline, Haiti =

Grande-Saline Grann Salin
- Commune
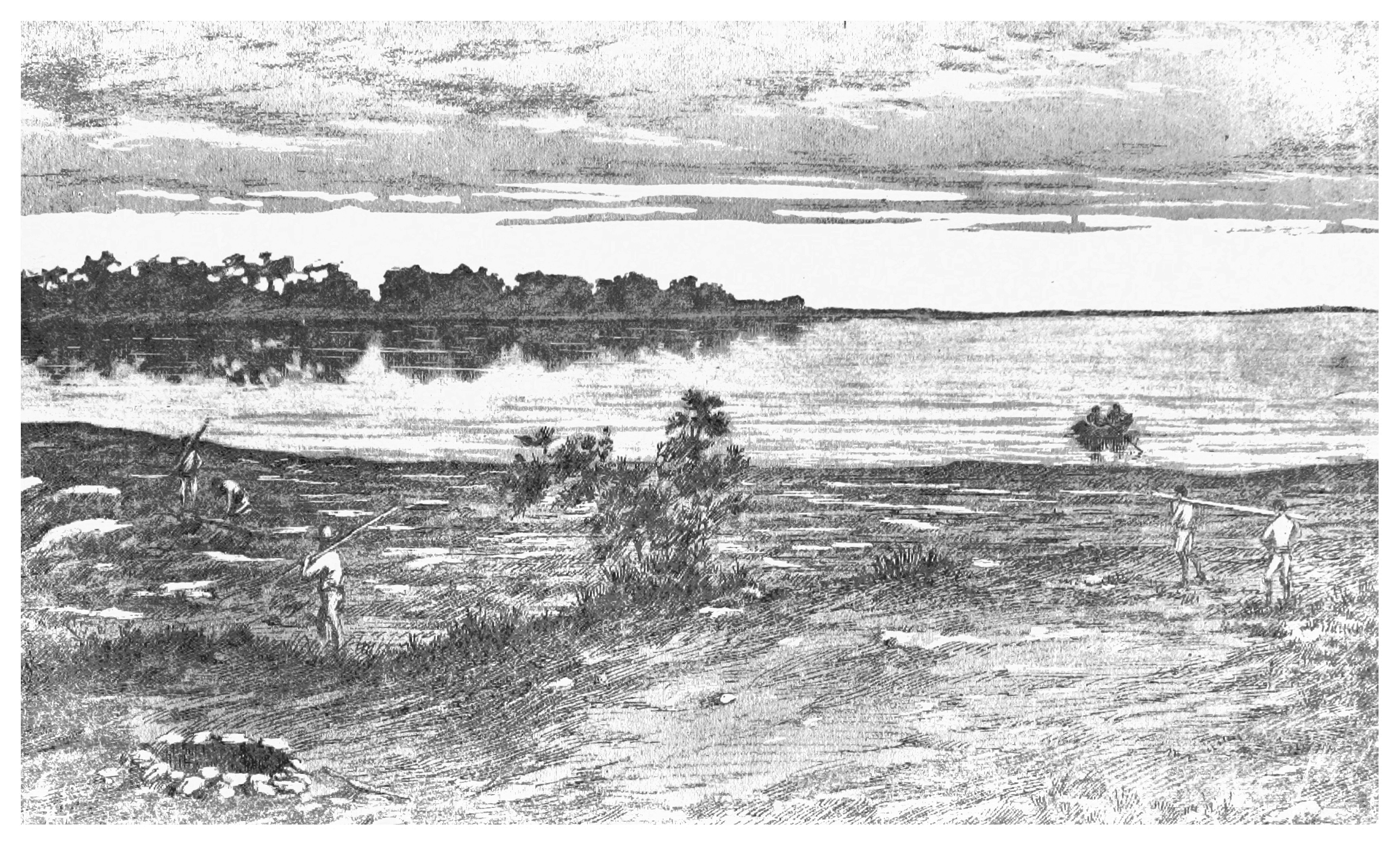
- Interactive map of Grande-Saline
- Location in Haiti
- Coordinates: 19°15′0″N 72°47′0″W
- Country: Haiti
- Department: Artibonite
- Arrondissement: Dessalines

Area
  - Total: 51.97 km^{2} (20.07 sq mi)
- Elevation: 0 m (0 ft)

Population (2015)
  - Total: 23,236
  - Density: 447.1/km^{2} (1,158/sq mi)
- Time zone: UTC−05:00 (EST)
  - Summer (DST): UTC−04:00 (EDT)
- Postal code: HT 4430

Grande-Saline (French pronunciation: [ɡʁɑ̃d salin]; Haitian Creole: Grann Salin) is a commune in the Dessalines Arrondissement in the Artibonite department of Haiti.
