= Desdunes =

Commune in Haiti

Desdunes Dedin
- Commune
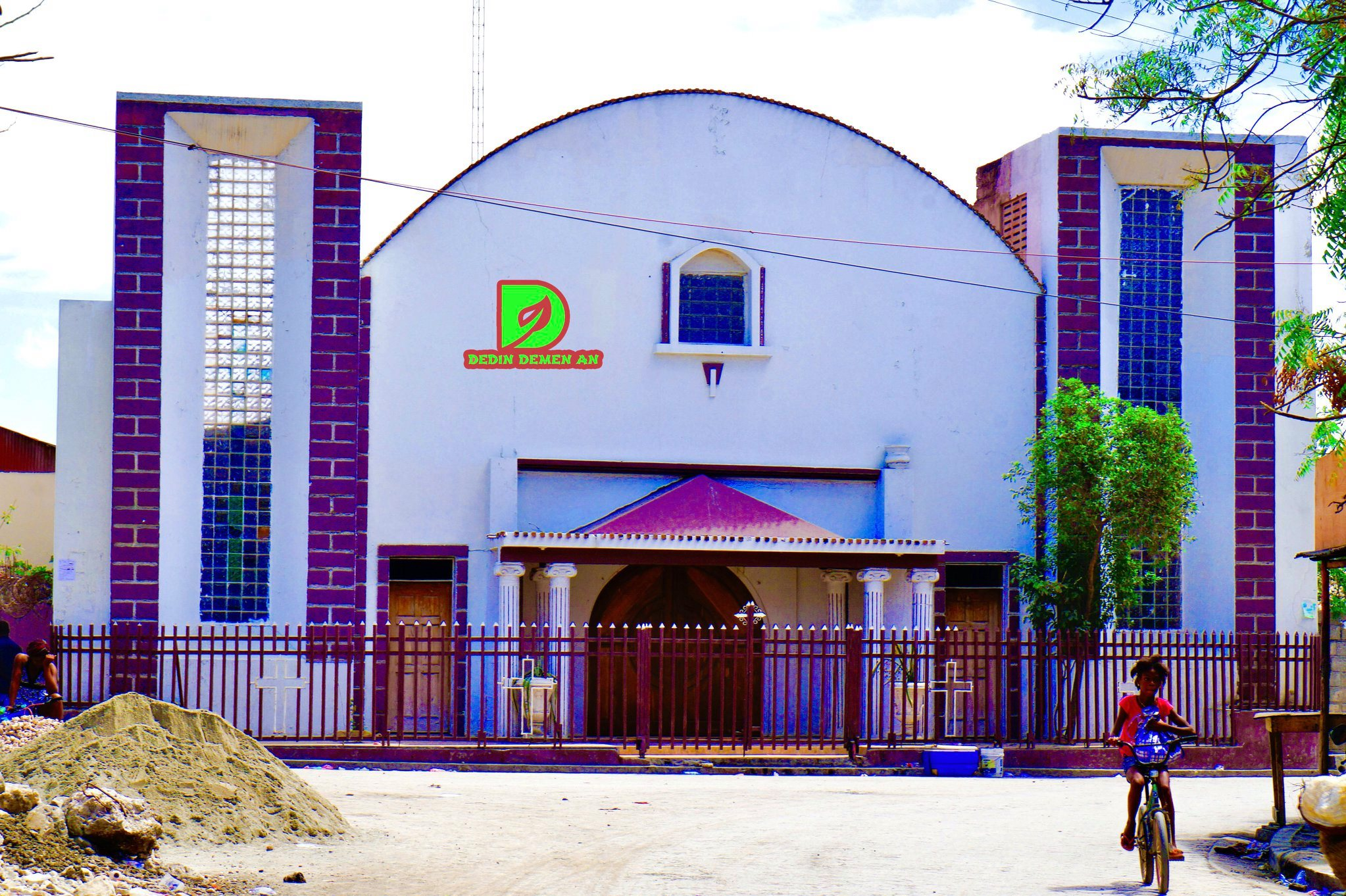
- Catholic Church In Desdunes
- Interactive map of Desdunes
- Location in Haiti
- Coordinates: 19°17′0″N 72°39′0″W
- Country: Haiti
- Department: Artibonite
- Arrondissement: Dessalines

Area
  - Total: 99.49 km^{2} (38.41 sq mi)
- Elevation: 98 m (322 ft)

Population (2015)
  - Total: 37,027
  - Density: 372.2/km^{2} (963.9/sq mi)
- Time zone: UTC−05:00 (EST)
  - Summer (DST): UTC−04:00 (EDT)
- Postal code: HT 4440

Desdunes (French pronunciation: [dedyn]; Haitian Creole: Dedin) is a commune in the Artibonite department of Haiti. It is located in the great Artibonite Plain in the heart of the rice granary of Haiti. The local economy is largely dependent on rice farming. The population was 37,027 at the 2015 census.

== About ==
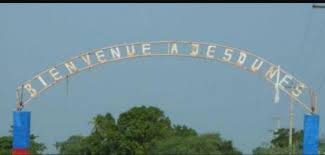
Welcome Sign

Desdunes is 86 km (54 miles) from Port-au-Prince and 19 km (12 miles) away from Gonaïves. The distance between the main part of the town and the Gulf of Gonâve is roughly 16 km (10 miles), and the sea is viewable from the area.

Desdunes was formed as a commune by an act of the law of 1983, when it broke away from the town of L'Estère. The residents knew the area as "Ti Desdunes" prior to the town's incorporation. Ti Desdunes was originally the second communal section of Gonaïves; Ti Desdunes also served as a military post for the Gonaïves Arrondissement.

== History ==
The town of Desdunes was founded at the time of the French colonization. The Rossignol family owned several industries including cotton and coffee. A member of this family that owned a cotton field, Louis Rossignol Lachicotte Desdunes, named the commune after himself.

== Geography ==
Desdunes is located at 19.2894° N, 72.6417° W. The eastern boundary is Route Nationale 1.

According to the IHSI, the commune has a total area of 99.49 square kilometers (38.41 square miles), of which 93.37 km^{2} (94%) is rural and suburban and 6.12 square kilometers (6%) is urban. It borders L'Estère to the north, Dessalines to the east, and Grande-Saline on the south.

Under the reign of the National Council of Government led by General Henry Nemphy, Desdunes was four communal sections.

In December 1990, many changes were made in the administrative structure of the area. The commune of Desdunes became composed of a central agglomeration (Desdunes) and 6 localities scattered on the municipal territory. 3 of the 4 sections were eliminated (i.e. the first, the third and the fourth sections). Only the second section composed of Grand-Islet and Hatte-Desdunes was allowed to participate in the elections.

Desdunes provides opportunities to observe the natural marshes and mangroves that run to Grand-Pierre Bay, which marks the boundary between the coastal plain and the vast Gulf of Gonâve, because it is partly surrounded on the west by coastal wetlands.

Many areas in the eastern part of town have been devoted to farming. Desdunes is mostly an agricultural community, but the farmer's tools are very rudimentary (the machete and the hoe) and the crops are subject to harsh changes of nature such as drought which is very common in the area.

Desdunes is made up of a number of neighborhoods:

- East of the geographical center of town is Desdunes. Desdunes is four kilometers from L'Estère which can be reached by a path in one hour of walking. It is roughly defined by the Desdunes Canal to the north, Rue Coloniale and Rue l'Hôpital to the east, Avenue Marie-Jeanne, along which runs l'Estère Canal, to the south, and Rue Nouvelle-Desdunes to the west. The zone consists of the Nouvelle-Desdunes, Lakou-Baptiste, Rasta, and Descarreaux neighborhoods.
- Duclos is located at across the canal from the south end of the Nouvelle-Desdunes Road. It is located along the Duclos canal.
- Modèl is a settlement in the southwest corner of the commune, near the border with Grande-Saline. Together with Duclos, the two represented Desdunes' original first communal section.
- Grand-Islet, coupled with Hatte-Desdunes, formed the second section.
- Aux Sources Sud runs along the banks of Rivière l'Estère. Its northern portion falls between l'Estère River and the l'Estère border line.
- Lagon-Penyen is a community that was once Desdunes' 4th section. This locality, which has a population of 26,952, or 76% of the population the municipality, has the highest concentration of residents in the commune.

== Demographics ==
Year	Population	Percent Growth
1998	29,333	0%
2003	42,000	+30%
2015	37,027	-13%

=== Neighborhoods ===
DED	Desdunes	Type	37,027	Settlements
VDD	Ville de Desdunes	Urban	33,222	Desdunes
DDU	1ere Section Desdunes	Rural section	3,805	Au-Source-Sud, Bois-Gerard, Chevreau, D'accuel, Duclos, Duclos-Desdunes, Grand-Lagon, Grand-l'Islet, L'Acul, La Hatte, Matelas, Modelle, Savane, Trou-Caïman, Vieux-Pilon.

== Climate and geology ==
The climate of the area is tropical dry. The seasons are marked by drought. During the dry season, the rainfall varies between 50 and 100 mm. The desertification is total. Access to clean water is a major problem in Desdunes. There is no source or river in the area, only a canal runs along the town on the southern edge, but the people wash there, do their laundry, and the animals drink from it. In the dry season, the canal is dry.

The plain of Artibonite (125 000 ha or 483 sq. miles) is the country's real grain store. It opens to the sea to the west and the mountains (500 to 1000 m altitude) to the east. This vast plain extends at an average altitude of 8 m below sea level. The soil geology is generally calcareous (high in calcium), of alluvial type (considered the most fertile), very deep (1.5 m), and strongly argillaceous (consisting of clay minerals). This type of land is favorable to rice growing.

=== Climate ===
The commune of Desdunes enjoys a dry tropical climate, with an average temperature of 26.5 °C (79.7 °F) and low rainfall which does not exceed 700 mm (28 in) per year on average.

This climate is characterized by two seasons:

- A dry season that runs from November to March with temperatures fluctuating around 25 °C (77 °F) in the dry season and very low rainfall reaching its lowest level in January with an average of 6 mm (0.25 in).
- A rainy season that extends from April to October, temperatures of about 28 °C (82 °F) and higher rainfall levels, reaching their highest level during the month of June with an average of 98 mm (3.8 in).

These climatic conditions can be explained by the location of the commune, located west of the Montagnes Noires and south of the Massif du Nord; clouds from the Atlantic Ocean, which are loaded with water, are discharging on the slopes to the east and north of these mountains because they are driven by the wind (trade winds from NE to SW). When they these mountains, clouds must rise at altitude, and then meet conditions of lower temperatures and pressures which this the phenomenon of condensation and precipitation; the other next to these mountains, where the commune of Desdunes is located, the air loses moisture and rainfall is weak.

=== Hydrographic network ===
In addition to these difficult weather conditions, the municipality is characterized by a relatively poor natural hydrographic network, marked by the Rivière l'Estère and its tributaries. These are powered by rainfall that waters the Montagnes Noires located east of the town. The relief forms a watershed which directs the runoff water towards watercourses that supply the L'Estère River, which is oriented east–west and marks the boundary between the commune of Desdunes and the commune of L'Estère;

The municipality also benefits from an artificial channel for the diversion of the River Artibonite, which allows for irrigation of acres of the lands of the commune.

This natural hydrographic network leads to the sea at Baie de la Tortue (Turtle Bay), with an average flow of less than 3 m^{3}/s. However, the municipality also benefits from an important network of artificial channels, powered by the rivers of Estère and Artibonite (Haiti's fastest flowing river at 99 m^{3}/s), crossing the whole commune of Desdunes from east to west to open in the Bay of Grande Pierre.

The commune, located on the plain of Artibonite, is characterized at a very low altitude (about 8 meters or 26 feet above sea level) by the absence of relief and by the presence of flood zones and mangrove swamps that form a buffer area between sea and land. The plain itself is surrounded by large mountain ranges: The Chaine des Matheux to the south, the Black Mountains to the east and the Massif du Nord to the northeast.

=== Soils ===
The soils of the commune are relatively poor and correspond in the best case to 5th grade soils, i.e. soils suitable for pasture and rice cultivation, offer high productivity with adequate layout. They are not able to accommodate other types of cultures, as the upper soil classes (from 1 to 4). These 5th category soils cover an area of 4009 hectares (15.5 sq. miles) located in the eastern part of the commune. These soils are affected in a general way by a process of salinization that impoverishes them. The 6th category soils, located in the center of the commune and covering 197 hectares (0.75 sq. miles) are soils to be dedicated to forest and pasture areas. These soils are very limited for agricultural activities because of their low depth and roughness.

Soils of the 7th category cover area of 2015 hectares (7.77 sq.mi) and are mainly based on the central area of the commune. These soils are not culturable and should only be intended for restières. Finally, the 8th category soils cover as for them a surface of 3628 hectares and are located exclusively on the fringe west of the town, near the sea. These soils, located in the mangrove area and swamps, should only be used for environmental protection and can not be used for commercial purposes like forestry or agriculture.

With regard to climatic hazards, the commune of Desdunes is primarily at risk of rainfall, which can cause floods and droughts.

== Economy ==
There are no banks in the municipality. The local residents go to other communes to carry out banking operations. However, there are three restaurants, a credit union and a marketing cooperative.

the soil is uncultivated due to persistent drought and lack of water supply. The residents of Desdunes rent their services seasonally in the rice fields in L'Estère. The local population often faces low food reserves. This persistent shortage has impoverished the community and has resulted in residents leaving the village in search of food security and job opportunities in the big cities. Goat farming is almost non-existent and it is only at the family level.

== Infrastructure ==
The supply of clean water and basic medical services are insufficient for the residents due to the town's small size. Various organizations are working to provide the necessary assistance to the townspeople as a result. Operation Blessing International's local arm called Operation Blessing Haiti Relief is among those groups helping Desdunes. The organization reached out to Desdunes residents last year, when they launched a clean drinking water and medical program. Under the program, residents received free supply of clean water and medical assistance in a span of 10 days.

=== Transportation ===
Desdunes is connected to L'Estère, the closest city, about four kilometers away by a dirt road. Walking remains the primary means of locomotion of the population.

=== Education ===
The Ministry of National Education of Youth and Sports is not represented in the commune of Desdunes. A large percentage of men and women do not know how to read or write and most children are not in school. A presbyteral school and three small community schools accommodate between 100 and 250 children. The school annexed to Good Samaritan Nutrition Center welcomes around 360 students from kindergarten to sixth grade.

=== Health ===
The Ministry of Public Health and Population is not represented in the municipality of Desdunes. There are two health centers with beds and a clinic, and two doctors and five auxiliaries who provide sanitary services at the commune level.

Other assistance programs are still being conducted in the town. Some of these programs involve treatments and preventive measures against various health issues such as tropical diseases and cholera. In-kind Donation of Safe Motherhood Kits and Rapid Response Mechanism are also among the programs rolled out in the small town.

=== Utilities ===
One river was counted at the commune level. For the other points of water there are public fountains with nearly 210 taps. Only the city has electricity which is provided by the Electricity of Haiti (EDH).

=== Security ===
The municipality has a court of peace, a police station, and one prison in the commune of Desdunes.

== Culture ==
=== Religion ===
The population practices several types of religion, mainly Catholics, Protestants, and douisants. According to the data of the IHSI, there would be 65 peristyles in the commune of Desdunes. Protestantism (41%) and Vodun (40%) are the religions most frequently performed according to the actual survey fielded by the GAFE, while the Catholic religion is practiced by only 17% of the population.

More than 26 temples of all beliefs have been enumerated in the commune. These temples are divided into Catholic, Baptist, Adventist, Pentecostal and Jehovah's Witness.

=== Socio-economic ===
Delays in children's growth are the result of protein-energy malnutrition and also of specific deficiencies in micronutrients. Other physical functions are affected such as disease resistance, work capacity, breastfeeding, and pregnancy. The Good Samaritain nutrition center, initiated in November 2004, offers the possibility for children to receive a balanced healthy meal a day and to be medically followed by doctor and a health assistant. Micro-manufacturing companies of rice straw briquettes are growing in the village, in order to replace the charcoal.

=== Organizations ===
There are four popular organizations, four peasant groups, two women's groups, and an international organization.

=== Communication ===
The town of Desdunes has multiple radio stations but no newspapers, magazines, or television stations.

=== Leisure ===
There are five gagères and a football pitch considered as a simple play area. For the cultural heritages, there are no monuments and sites.

The town celebrates the feast of patron Saint Peter on the 29th of June of each year.

Neighboring sections

	North 2e Petites-Desdunes, EST	Northeast 1re Lacroix-Perisse, EST
〰️West〰️ Canal de Saint-Marc	2e Bois Neuf Saint-Marc	East 2e Fossé-Naboth, DES
〰️Southwest〰️ Baie de Grand-Pierre	South 1re Poteneau, GDS	
