= Marmelade =

Marmelade Mamlad
- Commune
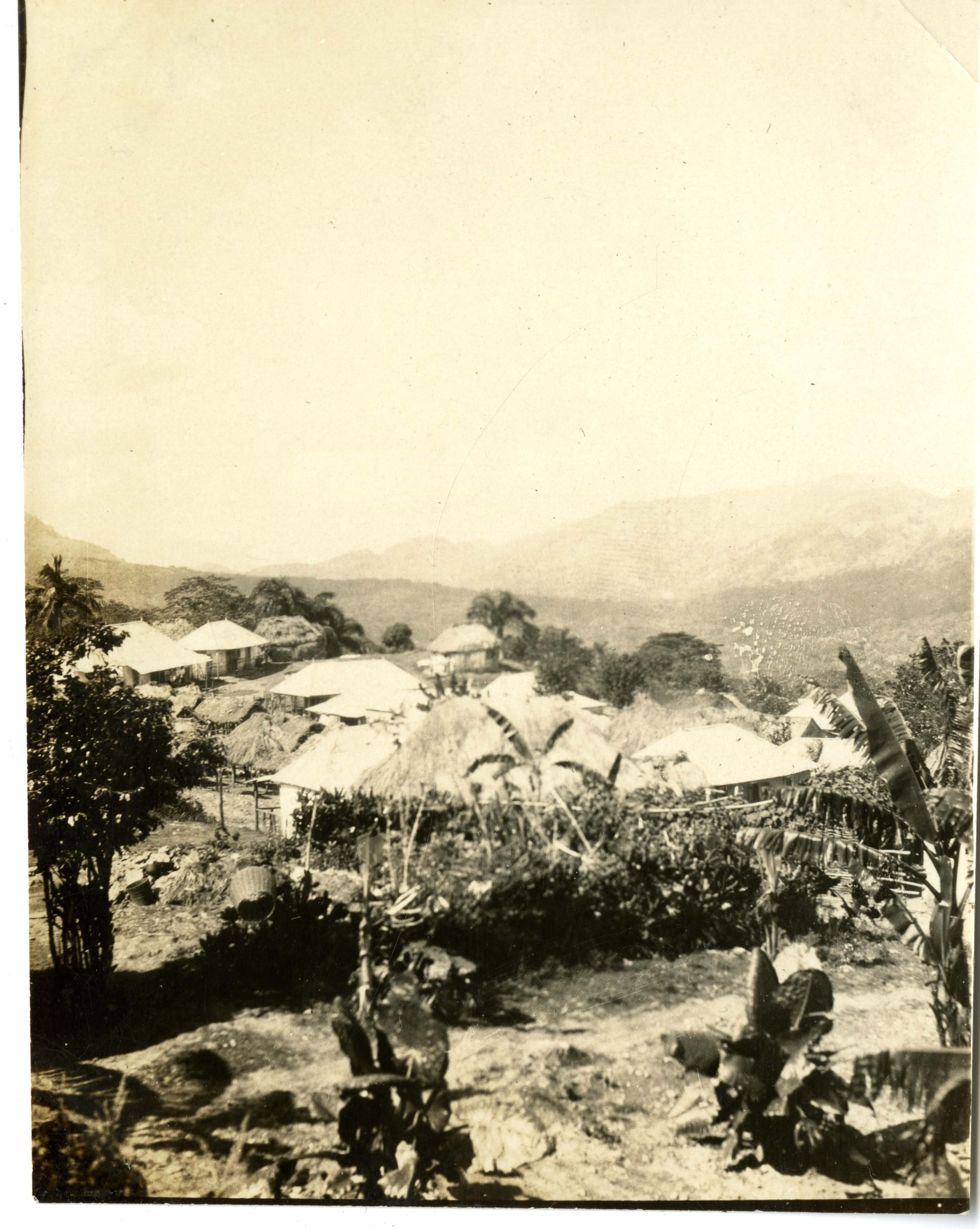
- Interactive map of Marmelade
- Location in Haiti
- Coordinates: 19°31′0″N 72°21′0″W
- Country: Haiti
- Department: Artibonite
- Arrondissement: Marmelade

Area
  - Total: 108.94 km^{2} (42.06 sq mi)
- Elevation: 759 m (2,490 ft)

Population (2015)
  - Total: 38,057
  - Density: 349.34/km^{2} (904.78/sq mi)
- Time zone: UTC−05:00 (EST)
  - Summer (DST): UTC−04:00 (EDT)
- Postal code: HT 4510

Marmelade (French pronunciation: [maʁməlad]; Haitian Creole: Mamlad) is a commune and former duchy in the Artibonite department of Haiti. It is the chief town of the Marmelade Arrondissement, which also includes the commune of Saint Michel de l'Attalaye.

Marmelade is the home town of Président René Préval. During the years following his first tenure, Préval initiated rural development projects in Marmelade, including a manufacturer of bamboo furniture.
