= Palais de la Belle Rivière =

Former palace of king Henri Christophe I in Haiti

Coordinates: 19°7′16″N 72°28′47″W

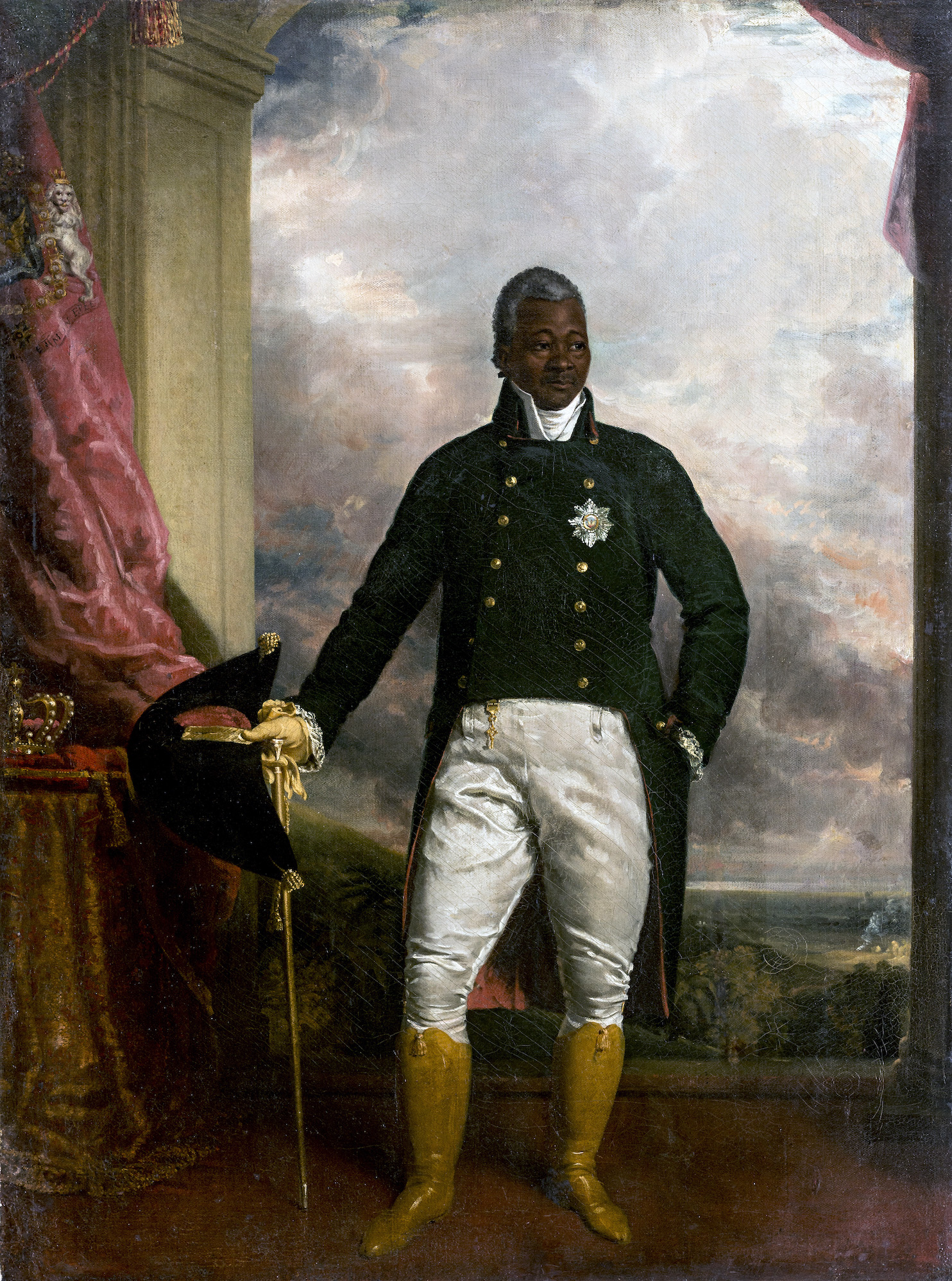
king Henri Christophe I by Richard Evans, c. 1816

The Palais de la Belle Rivière (French pronunciation: [palɛ də la bɛl ʁivjɛʁ], lit. 'Palace of the Beautiful River') is a former palace in Petite Rivière de l'Artibonite, in the Artibonite department of Haiti. It is also known as the ‘’palace of 365 doors’’ (French: Palais de 365 portes or French: Palais de trois cent soixante-cinq portes) although it does not have 365 doors. The palace was built for the first and last king of Haiti, Henri Christophe I. It overlooks the city center and the Artibonite River. Today, the palace ruins are in poor condition and deteriorating.

One kilometre east of the palace is the Crête-à-Pierrot fortress, where there was a major battle of the Haitian Revolution in March 1802.

== History ==
The Palais de la Belle Rivière was built in 1820 by Louis Dupeyrac to serve as a royal residence for king Henri Christophe, next to his residence in Milot, the Sans-Souci Palace. It was still under construction, when the Kingdom of Haiti fell in 1820 due to revolution and the king suffering a stroke. Shortly afterwards, he committed suicide—according to legend, by shooting himself with a silver bullet. Therefore, the palace was never completed, and the intended second floor was not realized.

Henri Christophe I constructed the palace to consolidate his power in the vast and rich agricultural Artibonite region, which bordered the republic of South Haiti, which was ruled by General Alexandre Pétion. Henri was known for his construction works: He built six châteaux, eight palaces and the massive Citadel Henri, now known as Citadelle Laferrière, on a mountain near Milot. The Sans-Souce palace was his most famous palace. Although in ruins today, this is a UNESCO World Heritage Site.

The Palace has a rectangular plan, 68 metres long and 11 metres wide. Its west facade is backed by a vast rotunda, 12 meters in diameter. The walls of the palace are made of stone masonry and clay bricks bonded with lime mortar.

The first restoration work was undertaken in 1932, when the first campaign to safeguard Haiti's monuments started. Although the restoration did probably not meet the rules of restoration, it slowed down the deterioration of the ruins and protected them against bad weather. In the second half of the 20th century, the building housed a municipal primary school and lodged various offices of the State and the Municipality. The palace also housed the local office of the National Security Volunteers (VSN), the Tonton Macoute, which was disbanded in 1986.

In 1995, the president of Haiti declared the palace national heritage and placed it in hands of the local municipality. Another restoration followed after the 2010 earthquake and the palace was restored from its dilapidated state. However today, the palace is still in poor condition and deteriorating again.

== Literature ==
- "Le Palais de la Belle-Rivière dit "Ka Wa"" (PDF). Bulletin de l'Ispan (in French). 5: 3. October 2009.
