= La Chapelle, Haiti =

La Chapelle Lachapèl
- Commune
- Interactive map of La Chapelle
- Location in Haiti
- Coordinates: 19°25′0″N 72°33′0″W
- Country: Haiti
- Department: Artibonite
- Arrondissement: Saint-Marc

Area
  - Total: 143.6 km^{2} (55.4 sq mi)
- Elevation: 234 m (768 ft)

Population (2015)
  - Total: 31,533
  - Density: 219.6/km^{2} (568.7/sq mi)
- Time zone: UTC−05:00 (EST)
  - Summer (DST): UTC−04:00 (EDT)
- Postal code: HT 4330

La Chapelle (French pronunciation: [la ʃapɛl]; Haitian Creole: Lachapèl) is a commune in the Saint-Marc Arrondissement, in the Artibonite department of Haiti. It has 31,533 inhabitants as of 2015.
