= Gonaïves Arrondissement =

Administrative division of Haiti

Coordinates: 19.45°N 72.6833°W

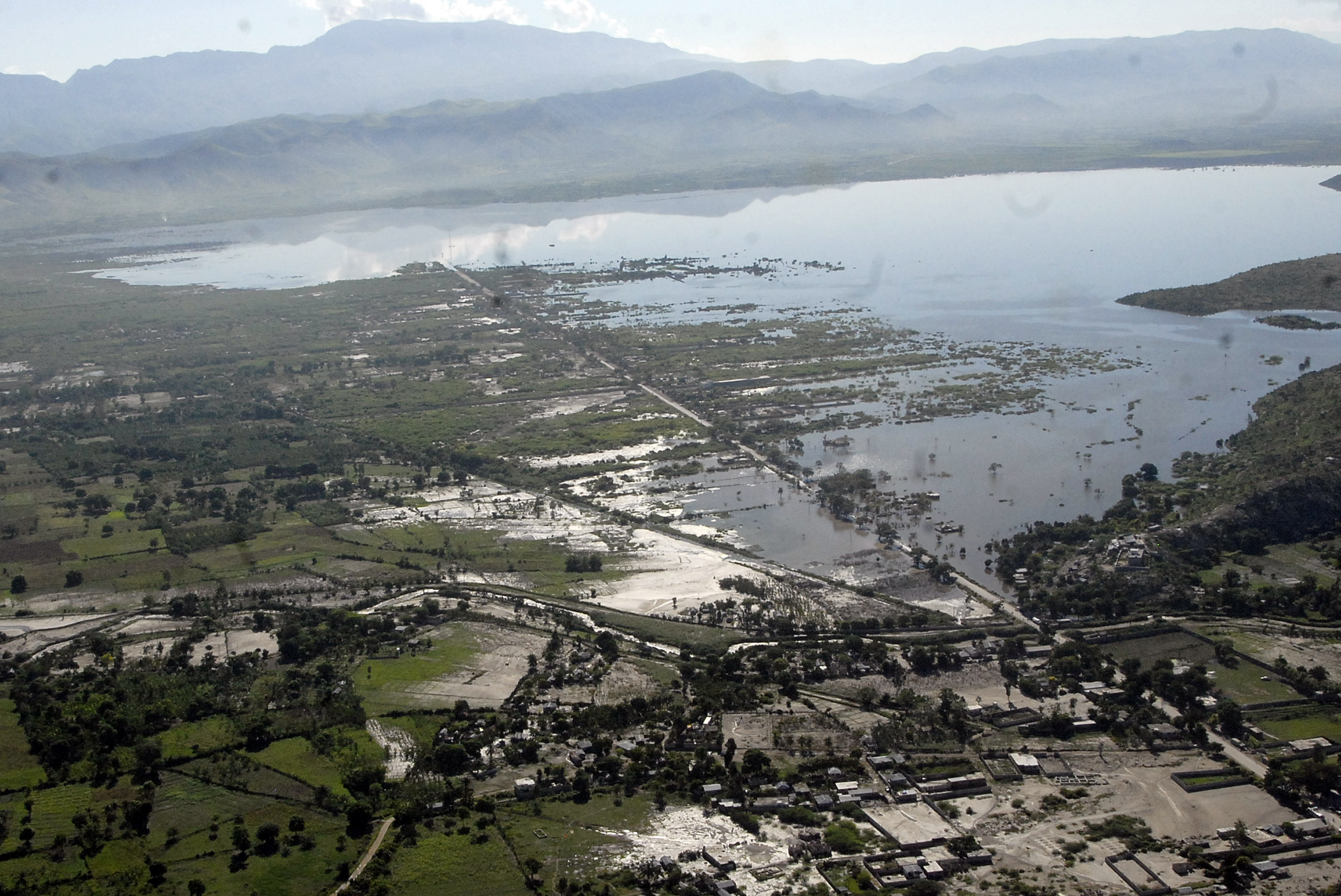
Aerial view of Gonaïves

Gonaïves (Haitian Creole: Gonayiv) is an arrondissement in the Artibonite department of Haiti. It has 263,858 inhabitants. Postal codes in the Gonaïves Arrondissement start with the number 41.

The arrondissement consists of the following municipalities:

- Gonaïves
- Ennery
- L'Estère
