= Anse-Rouge =

Anse-Rouge Ans Wouj
- Commune
- Interactive map of Anse-Rouge
- Location in Haiti
- Coordinates: 19°38′0″N 73°3′0″W
- Country: Haiti
- Department: Artibonite
- Arrondissement: Gros-Morne

Area
  - Total: 434.35 km^{2} (167.70 sq mi)
- Elevation: 50 m (160 ft)

Population (2015)
  - Total: 43,395
  - Density: 99.908/km^{2} (258.76/sq mi)
- Time zone: UTC−05:00 (EST)
  - Summer (DST): UTC−04:00 (EDT)
- Postal code: HT 4230
- Climate: Aw

Anse-Rouge (French pronunciation: [ɑ̃s ʁuʒ], lit. 'Red Bay'; Haitian Creole: Ans Wouj) is a commune in the Gros-Morne Arrondissement, in the Artibonite department of Haiti.
