= Gros-Morne Arrondissement =

Arrondissement of Haiti

Coordinates: 19°40′15″N 72°40′42″W

Gros-Morne (Haitian Creole: Gwo Mòn) is an arrondissement in the Artibonite department of Haiti.

It includes three communes: Anse-Rouge, Gros-Morne, and Terre-Neuve.
