= Saint-Marc Arrondissement =

Arrondissement of Haiti

Coordinates: 19.1167°N 72.7°W

Saint-Marc (Haitian Creole: Sen Mak) is an arrondissement in Artibonite department of Haiti. It has 268,499 inhabitants. Postal codes in the Saint-Marc Arrondissement start with the number 43.

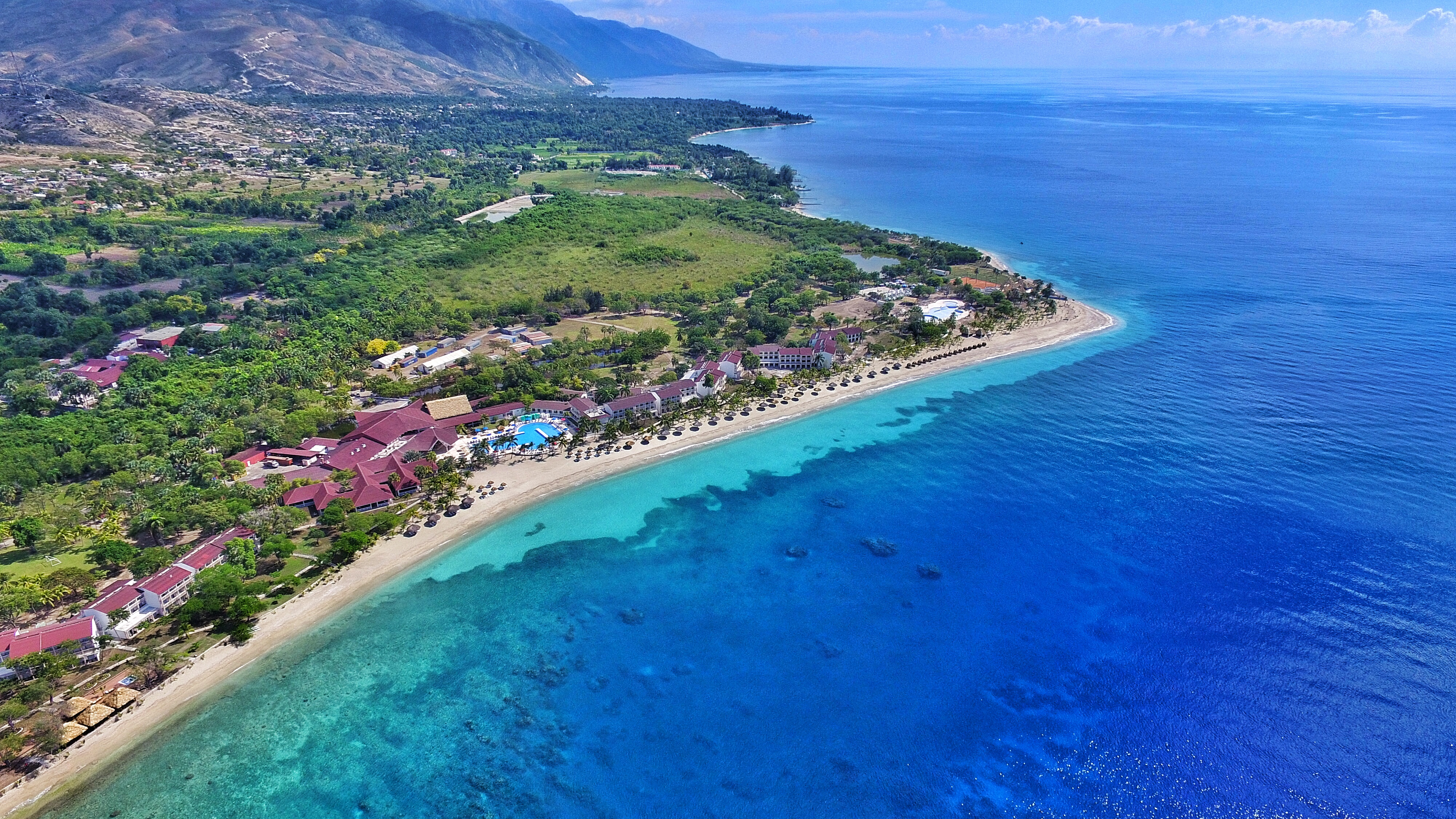
Saint-Marc Arrondissement

The arrondissement consists of the following municipalities:

- Saint-Marc
- La Chapelle
- Verrettes
- Montrouis
- Liancourt
