= Terre-Neuve, Haiti =

Terre-Neuve Tènèv
- Commune
- Interactive map of Terre-Neuve
- Location in Haiti
- Coordinates: 19°36′0″N 72°47′0″W
- Country: Haiti
- Department: Artibonite
- Arrondissement: Gros-Morne

Area
  - Total: 176.83 km^{2} (68.27 sq mi)
- Elevation: 524 m (1,719 ft)

Population (2015)
  - Total: 31,252
  - Density: 176.73/km^{2} (457.74/sq mi)
- Time zone: UTC−05:00 (EST)
  - Summer (DST): UTC−04:00 (EDT)
- Postal code: HT 4220

Terre-Neuve (French pronunciation: [tɛʁ nœv]; Haitian Creole: Tènèv) is a commune in the Gros-Morne Arrondissement, in the Artibonite department of Haiti. It has 31,252 inhabitants (2015).
