= L'Estère =

L'Estère Lestè
- Commune
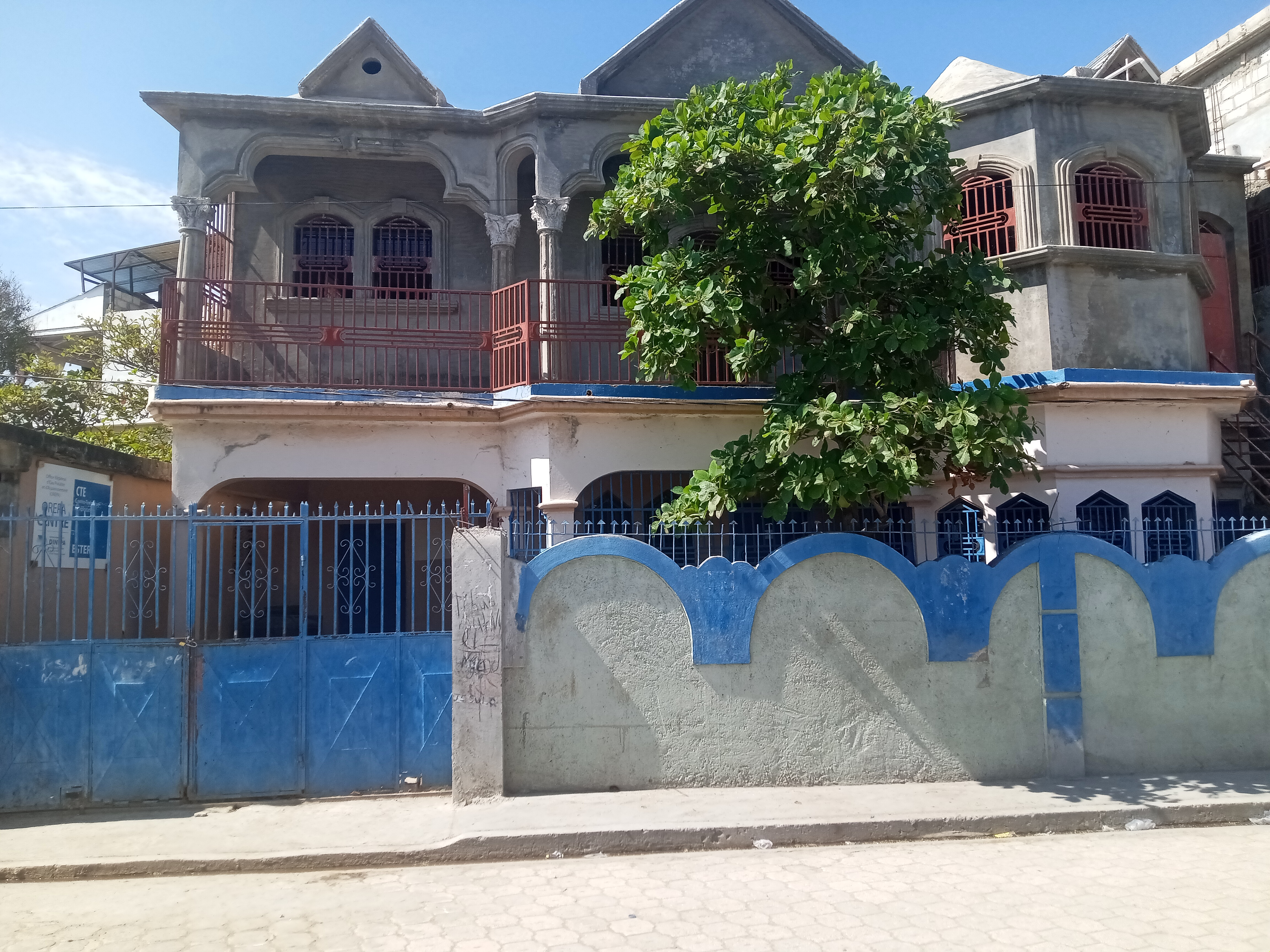
- Interactive map of L'Estère
- Location in Haiti
- Coordinates: 19°18′29″N 72°36′21″W
- Country: Haiti
- Department: Artibonite
- Arrondissement: Gonaïves

Area
  - Total: 176.24 km^{2} (68.05 sq mi)
- Elevation: 3 m (9.8 ft)

Population (2015)
  - Total: 45,159
  - Density: 256.24/km^{2} (663.65/sq mi)
- Time zone: UTC−05:00 (EST)
  - Summer (DST): UTC−04:00 (EDT)
- Postal code: HT 4130

L'Estère (French pronunciation: [lɛstɛʁ]; Haitian Creole: Lestè) is a commune in the Gonaïves Arrondissement, in the Artibonite department of Haiti. The population was 45,159 at the 2015 census. This historical city is where the famous battle of the Haitian Revolution took place on February 23, 1803, between the troops of Rochambeau and Dessalines at the Ravine-à-Couleuvres.
