= Ennery, Artibonite =

Ennery Ènri
- Commune
- Interactive map of Ennery
- Location in Haiti
- Coordinates: 19°29′0″N 72°29′0″W
- Country: Haiti
- Department: Artibonite
- Arrondissement: Gonaïves

Area
  - Total: 216.89 km^{2} (83.74 sq mi)
- Elevation: 365 m (1,198 ft)

Population (2015)
  - Total: 51,221
  - Density: 236.16/km^{2} (611.65/sq mi)
- Time zone: UTC−05:00 (EST)
  - Summer (DST): UTC−04:00 (EDT)
- Postal code: HT 4120

Ennery (French pronunciation: [ɛnʁi]; Haitian Creole: Ènri) is a commune in the Gonaïves Arrondissement, in the Artibonite department of Haiti. It has 51,221 inhabitants.
