= Montrouis =

- Communal section
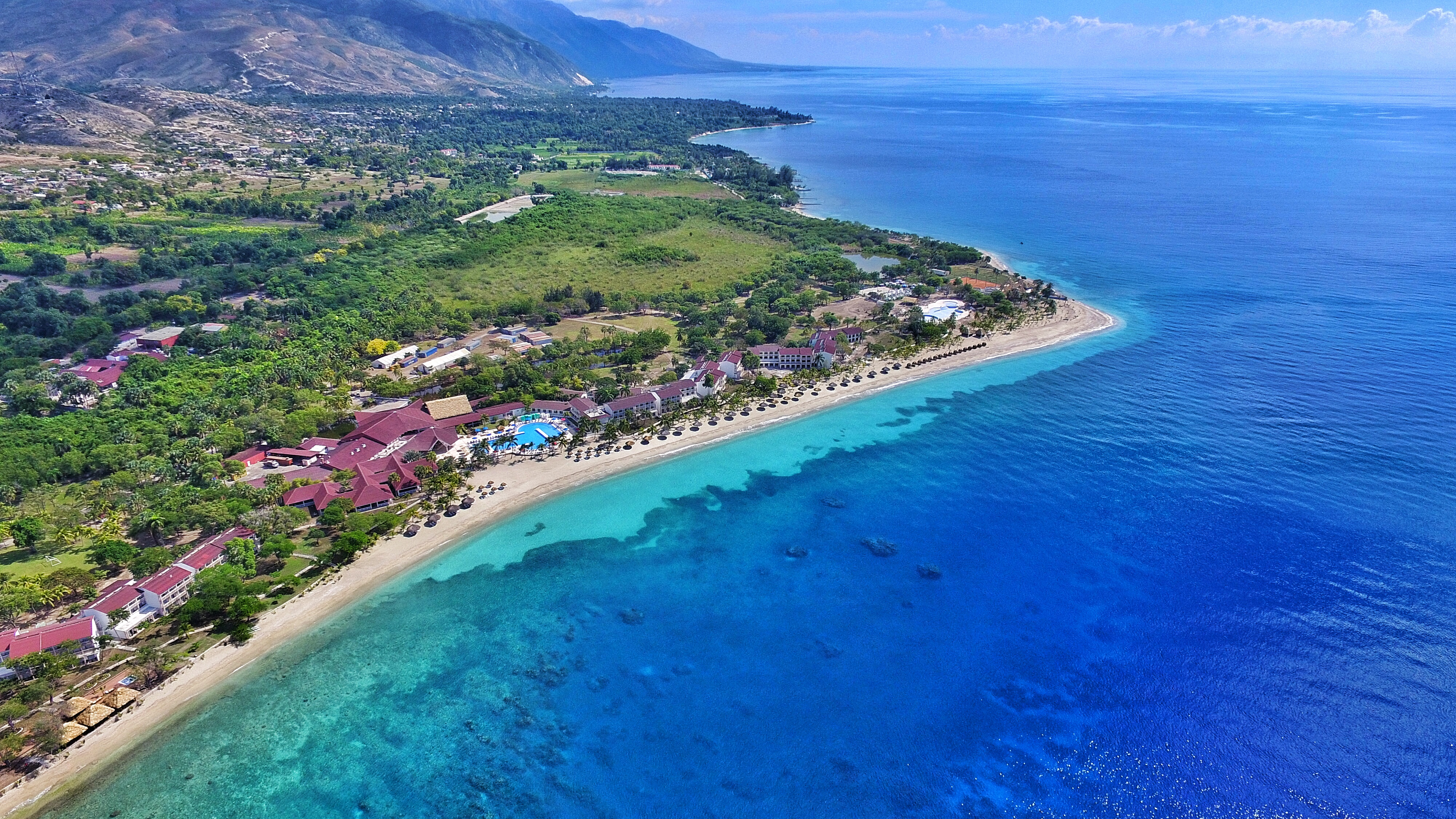

- Location in Haiti
- Coordinates: 18°57′2″N 72°42′16″W
- Country: Haiti
- Department: Artibonite
- Arrondissement: Saint-Marc

Population
  - Total: 18,419

Montrouis is a coastal communal section in Haiti, located in the department of Artibonite, south of Saint-Marc. Montrouis is one of the most important beach tourism destinations in Haiti, with several well renowned hotels and resorts, including the Moulin-sur-Mer. The town is located on the Côtes-des-Arcadins, one of Haiti's longest stretches of pure white sand beaches. It is also an exceptional place for sailing and fishing.

== 25th Session of the IARP General Assembly ==
The 25th session of the Amateur radio international operation general assembly was held in Montrouis in December 1994. This session adopted a convention allowing amateur radio operators to operate in an IARP member country temporarily while using a permit issued by another member country.
