= Gros-Morne, Haiti =

Gros-Morne Gwo Mòn
- Commune
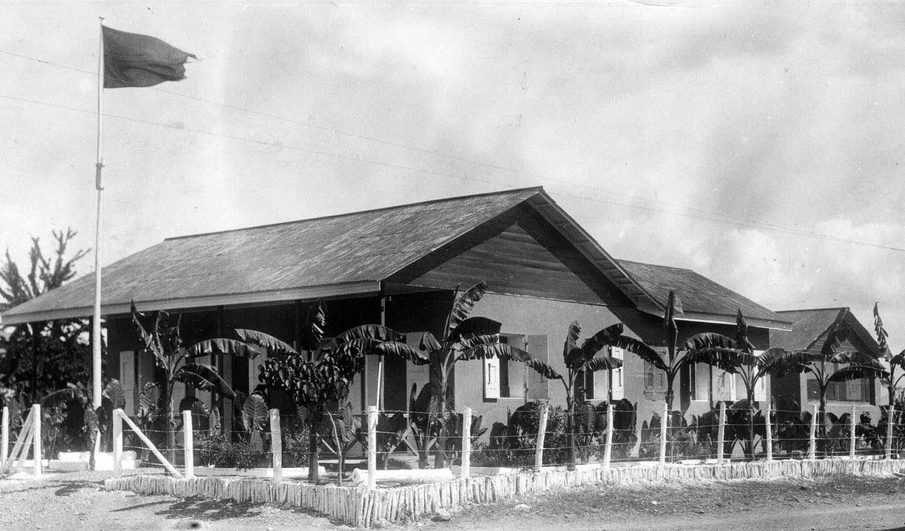
- Interactive map of Gros-Morne
- Location in Haiti
- Coordinates: 19°40′0″N 72°41′0″W
- Country: Haiti
- Department: Artibonite
- Arrondissement: Gros-Morne

Area
  - Total: 397.03 km^{2} (153.29 sq mi)
- Elevation: 211 m (692 ft)

Population (2015)
  - Total: 155,692
  - Density: 392.14/km^{2} (1,015.6/sq mi)
- Time zone: UTC−05:00 (EST)
  - Summer (DST): UTC−04:00 (EDT)
- Postal code: HT 4210

Gros-Morne (French pronunciation: [ɡʁo mɔʁn]; Haitian Creole: Gwo Mòn) is a commune in the Gros-Morne Arrondissement, in the Artibonite department of Haiti. It has 155,692 inhabitants (2015). Gros-Morne is a rural city in Haiti. Its name means "Big Mountain."

== Economy ==
Gros-Morne is famous for its production of the "Madame Francis" mango, in spite of the limited means of transport.
