= Marmelade Arrondissement =

Administrative division of Haiti

Coordinates: 19.5167°N 72.35°W

Marmelade (Creole: Mamlad) is an arrondissement in the Artibonite department of Haiti. It has 120,193 inhabitants. Postal codes in the Marmelade Arrondissement start with the number 45.

The arrondissement consists of the following municipalities:

- Saint-Michel-de-l'Atalaye
- Marmelade
