= Petite-Rivière-de-l'Artibonite =

Petite-Rivière-de-l'Artibonite Ti Rivyè Latibonit
- Commune
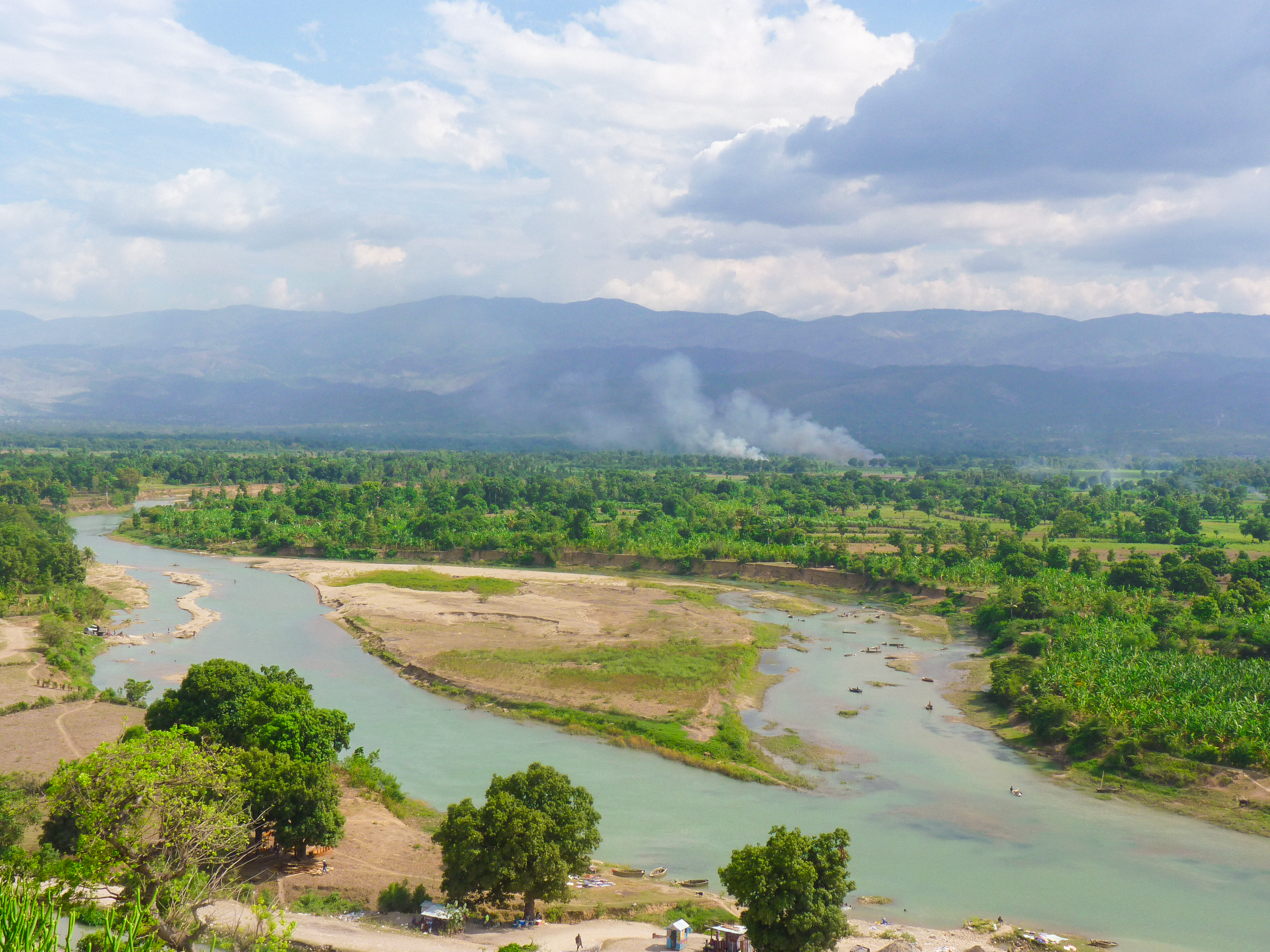
- Interactive map of Petite-Rivière-de-l'Artibonite
- Location in Haiti
- Coordinates: 19°08′0″N 72°29′0″W
- Country: Haiti
- Department: Artibonite
- Arrondissement: Dessalines

Area
  - Total: 506.71 km^{2} (195.64 sq mi)
- Elevation: 37 m (121 ft)

Population (2015)
  - Total: 170,740
  - Density: 336.96/km^{2} (872.72/sq mi)
- Time zone: UTC−05:00 (EST)
  - Summer (DST): UTC−04:00 (EDT)
- Postal code: HT 4111

Petite-Rivière-de-l'Artibonite (French pronunciation: [pətit ʁivjɛʁ də laʁtibɔnit]; Haitian Creole: Ti Rivyè Latibonit) is a commune in the Dessalines Arrondissement, in the Artibonite department of Haiti. It is located in the Artibonite Valley, with the center of the town on a bluff overlooking the Artibonite River.

One of the important battles of the Haitian Revolution (1791–1804) was fought here at Crete Pierrot; Jean-Jacques Dessalines ravaged the French army led by Rochambeau.

The town is the site of Palais de la Belle Rivière, a palace built from 1816 to 1820 by Henri Christophe. Its construction was never finished. Despite a popular urban legend, the palace does not have 365 doors and 52 windows. Following the 2010 earthquake, the palace was restored from its dilapidated state.

In April 2025 the area was attacked by a gang.
