= Artibonite (department) =

Department of Haiti

Coordinates: 19.45°N 72.6833°W

Artibonite Latibonit
- Department
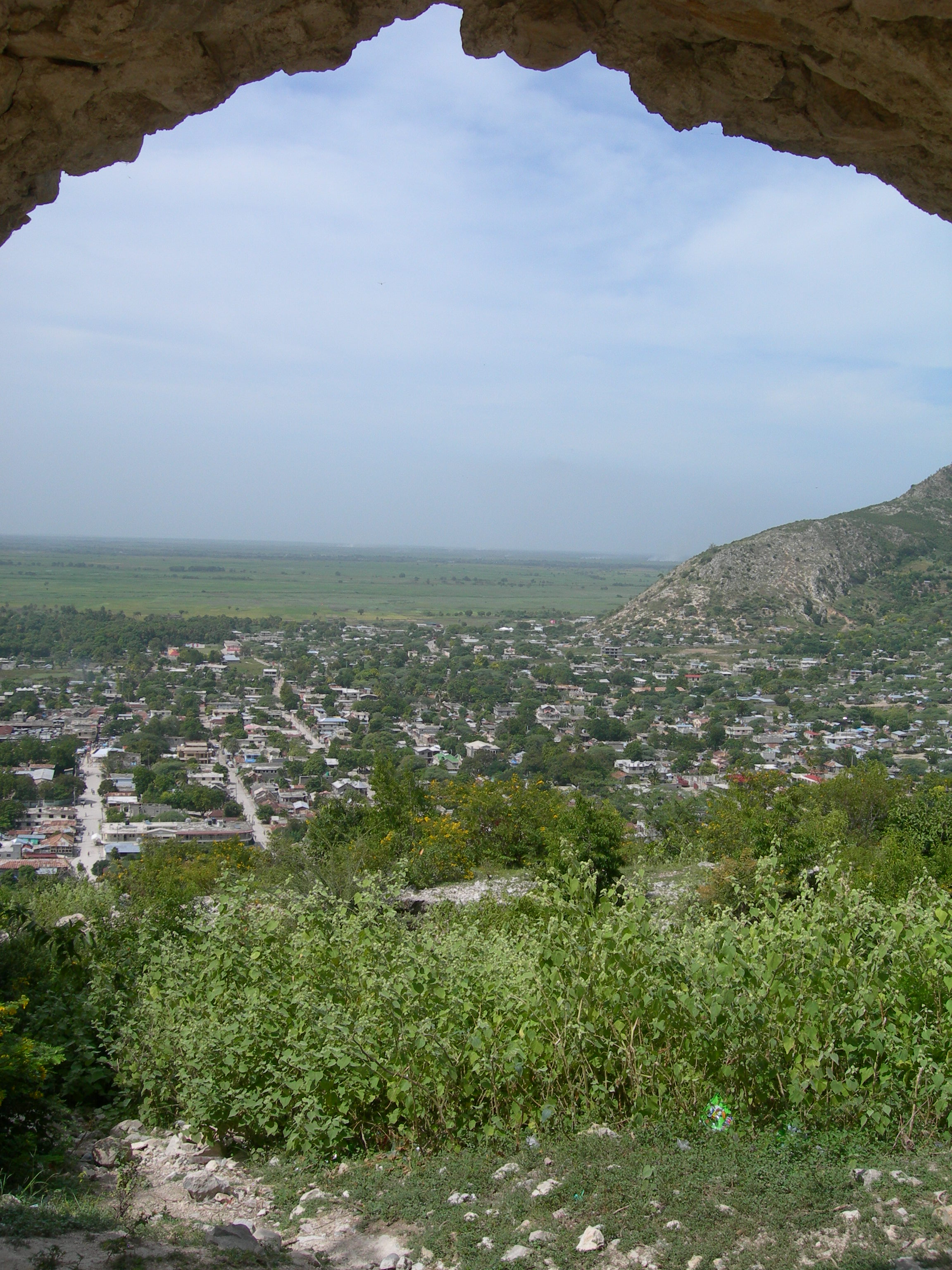
- Dessalines, Artibonite

- Artibonite in Haiti
- Country: Haiti
- Capital: Gonaïves
- Region: Artibonite
- Symbole: Dessalines Coat of Arm

Government
  - Type: Departmental Council

Area
  - Department: 4,986.94 km^{2} (1,925.47 sq mi)

Population (2015)
  - Department: 1,727,524
  - Rank: 2nd
  - Density: 346.410/km^{2} (897.197/sq mi)
  - Urban: 739,787
  - Rural: 987,737
- Time zone: UTC-05:00 (EST)
  - Summer (DST): UTC-04:00 (EDT)
- ISO 3166 code: HT-AR
- HDI (2017): 0.469 low · 7th

Artibonite (French pronunciation: [aʁtibɔnit]; Haitian Creole: Latibonit) is one of the ten departments of Haiti located in central Haiti. With an area of 4,887 km^{2} it is Haiti's largest department. As of 2015, its estimated population was 1,727,524. The region is the country's main rice-growing area. The main cities are Gonaïves (the capital) and Saint-Marc. In February 2004 an insurgency tried unsuccessfully to declare Artibonite's independence.

== Etymology ==
The name L'Artibonite is derived from the Artibonite River, the longest river on Hispaniola. L'Artibonite is derived from the Taino ja'tibonicu meaning "Great High Place of the Sacred Waters." Under the administration of Toussaint Louverture, the department was known as Toussaint's Department.

== History ==
=== Taino period ===
During the pre-colonial period, the area of the present-day department was divided among the Taíno cacicazgos of Marien, Maguana, and Jaragua. The border between these chiefdoms is generally believed to have followed the Artibonite River. Although the department's capital, Gonayibo, is thought to have belonged to the Xaragua chiefdom, it was located near the border between the three territories.

Haitian oral tradition recounts that the Taíno queen traveled annually from her principal city of Yaguana to Gonayibo, accompanied by her nitainos (nobles), a journey that is said to have inspired the origins of Haitian Rara traditions.

Some of the best-known Taíno settlements and archaeological sites in the department are Gonaibo, Amani-y, the caves of Dondon and archeological sites in the Cote-des-Arcadins area.

=== French period ===
Under the French administration the towns of St-Marc, L'Éstère. Mirebalais and Petite-Rivières-de-l'Artibonite were important French settlements with multiple plantations in the Valley. During that period the town of St-Marc was under the control of the colonialists and was the seat of Assemblée Colonial or the Colonial Assembly.

=== Haitian Revolution ===
At the beginning of the Revolution, St-Marc was burned by Dessalines and Gonaives by Vernet under the order of Toussaint in response to Napoléon's tyrannic behaviors. Later on, Toussaint defeated the French troops at the Bataille-de-la-Ravine-à-Couleuvre near the town of Gonaives. In Gonaives the French captured Toussaint and he was later sent to France and died.

In April 1802 during the siege of Crête-à-Pierrot that lasted almost one month, the indigenous troops offer the French generals the greatest resistance. During that battle, Dessalines threatened to set fire to the gunpowder reserve in case the French would enter the fort. The Haitian hero Marie-Jeanne Lamartinière surprised the French troops with her courageous behavior.

=== Haitian period ===
Gabart commander of St-Marc, Vernet commander of Gonaives, and Dessalines commander of the Indigenous Army are signatories of the Haitian Declaration of Independence. Gonayiv is the first city to be gained from the French troops by the Indigenous Army, and Gabart freed St-Marc on September 4, 1803.

On January 1, 1804, the city of Gonaives hold the first Haitian political conference and witness the Declaration of Independence under the eyes of Dessalines, Henry, Pétion, Geffrard, Boirond Tonnerre, some British troops and many more. The town of Dessalines became the world's first black capital and the seat of the Haitian Empire. Many times, the department has dissociated itself from Port-au-Prince and the West many times notably under the leadership of Henry Christophe, Nissage Saget, receiving Fabre Geffrard against Faustin. In the contemporary period, Gonaives rose furiously in 1986 and 2004 overthrowing both Duvalier and Aristide.

== Geography ==
The department is bordered to the north by North and North-West, on the west the Gulf of Gonave, the south West and the east and Centre. A core geographic feature of this department is the Artibonite River, which runs through the southern half of the department, allowing for rice cultivation in the Artibonite Valley. The department has two mountain ranges running from NW to SE. On the North shore of the Valley is Black Mountain and on the south shore is Mattheux Mountain. The Bay of Gonaïves is one of the best-protected bays in the country. The Bay of St-Marc is the biggest U-shaped bay in the country. The department doesn't have any major fault line through it.

== Environment ==
One of Haiti's biggest mangrove forests, harboring flamingos and other rare species, is located south of Gonaïves. There are also sand dunes in that area. There are many lagoons and rivers that run through the Valley. The largest lake in Artibonite is Bois-Neuf Lake south of St-Marc.

== Economy ==
The department has been in a state of economic decline since insurgencies and coups have reduced the nation's stability. Since the election of President René Garcia Préval, the production of rice and other crops has been increasing.

=== Tourism ===
From St-Marc to Montrouis the coastal area is known for its breathtaking beaches and potential for resort tourism. Some of the most notable beaches are Amani-y, Grosse-Roche, Decameron, Moulin-sur-Mer and more.

Cultural tourism focusing on Haitian history, forts, and Vodoun.

=== Agriculture and Fishing ===
The Valley is known as Haiti's food basket. Until the 1980s Haiti was able to be self-sufficient. Many families have farm animals such as pigs, goats, beef, chicken, and more.

=== Mining ===
Gonaïves is a point of interest for mining notably in the disaffected mines of Sedren.

=== Salt Production ===
Grande-Saline and Anse-Rouge are known for their Haitian Sea Salt production.

=== Energy ===
Haiti's biggest electrical dam is also used to control the flow of the Artibonite.

== Transport ==
The main road through the department is the RN1 connecting Okap to Pòtoprens, passing through Gonayiv and Sen-Mak. This road often causes congestion in Sen-Mak since it goes through the city. The RN5 connects Gonayiv to Gwomòn. The RD103 and RD304 connect Gonayiv to Ench and the Haitian-Dominican border. The RD101 and RD301 connect Sen-Mak to Mibalè and the Haitian-Dominican border.

Both St-Marc and Gonaïves are port towns harboring ships.

The Artibonite river is navigable by small rafts called kannòt and even jet skies

The department has no international airport although Gonaïves has a small airway.

== Health ==
Population health in Haiti has suffered from political instability and natural disasters. The Hôpital Albert Schweitzer Haiti is located in Deschapelles, Haiti. Established in 1956, it has grown to provide health care in the hospital and clinics to the Artibonite region with a budget of $6 million in 2015. In addition to founder Dr. Larry Mellon, notable figures in its history include Dr Harold May, Founder and President of FAMILY, Inc. (Fathers and Mothers, Infants, eLders, and Youth). In the Verrettes commune, FAMILY seeks to promote sustainable development. In addition, U. S. Tuskegee University has partnered with FAMILY to establish the FAMILY Tuskegee Institute of Haiti to develop academic and vocational training in the areas of forestry, agriculture and health care.

Trow other major hospitals are St-Nicolas in St-Marc and The Providence in Gonaïves.

== Historic places and landmarks ==
Several noteworthy events of the Haitian Revolution took place in the Artibonite Department.

- Gonaïves: the City of Independence
- Ravine-à-Couleuvre: site of the famous battle between Major General Toussaint Louverture and French troops commanded by Rochambeau.
- Petite Rivière de l'Artibonite: where Henry Christophe built his palace with 365 doors.
- Fort de La Crête-à-Pierrot: site of the Battle of Crête-à-Pierrot between Haitian rebels and French troops.
- Habitation Georges: site of Major-General Toussaint Louverture's arrest.
- Dessalines (formerly Marchand): Capital of the First Empire.
- Vieux Bac: near Grande-Saline where Toussaint Louverture defeated Colonel Brisbane in December 1794.
- Deschapelles, in the Artibonite Valley, is the location of the Hôpital Albert Schweitzer.
- Saint Marc, in the Artibonite Valley, is the Origin of soldiers who were sent to Savannah, Georgia USA in 1779 to fight for the Port of Savannah.
- Fort Blockhaus (Blòkòs) and Diamond (Djanman) in Saint-Marc
- Henry's castle ruin in Saint-Marc

Other facts:

- Dessalines and Maire-Claire got married in St-Marc
- After the execution of a St-Marc officer in Sansousi Palace, the city rebelled against the crown leading to the King's suicide in October 1820.

== Demography ==
The 2015 population of Artibonite was estimated at 1,727,524 (2015), with 739,787 (43%) residing in urban areas and (57%) residing in rural areas.

Year	Total Pop.	%±	Urban	Rural	Ratio
2003	1,299,398	———	422,476	876,922	32:68
2009	1,571,020	20.9%	607,757	963,263	39:61
2015	1,727,524	10.0%	739,787	987,737	43:57

Due to its importance, Artibonite is the second most populated department in Haiti. After the 2010 Earthquake, many families left the West for Artibonite. The department can better be subdivided into 3 distinct regions:

- The Horn or North'Artibonite that serves a buffer with the N-O, the Gros-Morne arrondissement
- Artibonite Proper or the northside of the Valley
- Lower-Artibonite or southside of the Valley, the St-Marc arrondissement

Commune	Nickname	Subregion	Population	Area	River
Gros-Morne	Mango city	Corne-de-l'Artibonite	141587	397	Mancelle
Gonaïves	Independence City	l'Artibonite	360000	574	La Quinte
St-Marc	Lion city	Bas-Artibonite	242485	557	St-Marc
Petite-Rivière	Fort-Lamartinières	l'Artibonite	307578	506	Artibonite
Dessalines	Emperor city	l'Artibonite	165424	474	L'Éstère
Ennery	Louverture city	l'Artibonite	51221	217	Bayonnais

== Culture ==
It is also a hub in Haitian machete fencing, cuisine with diri a lalo and has multiple colonial forts.

== Administrative divisions ==
The Department of Artibonite is subdivided into five arrondissements, which are further subdivided into sixteen communes.

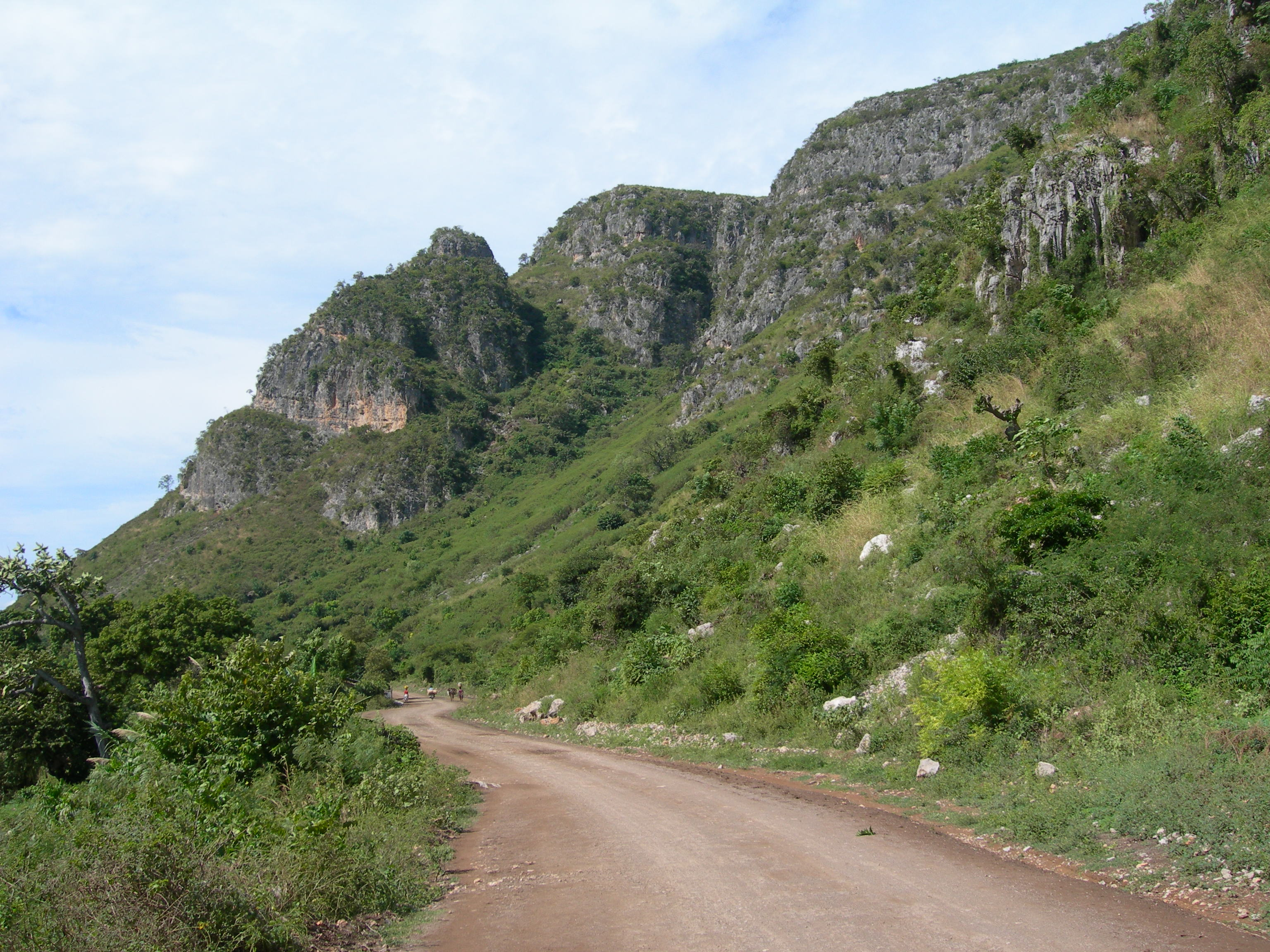
Dessalines Arrondissement

- Dessalines Arrondissement
  - Desdunes
  - Dessalines
  - Grande Saline
  - Petite Rivière de l'Artibonite
- Gonaïves Arrondissement
  - Ennery
  - L'Estère
  - Gonaïves
- Gros-Morne Arrondissement
  - Anse-Rouge
  - Gros-Morne
  - Terre-Neuve
- Marmelade Arrondissement
  - Marmelade
  - Saint-Michel-de-l'Atalaye

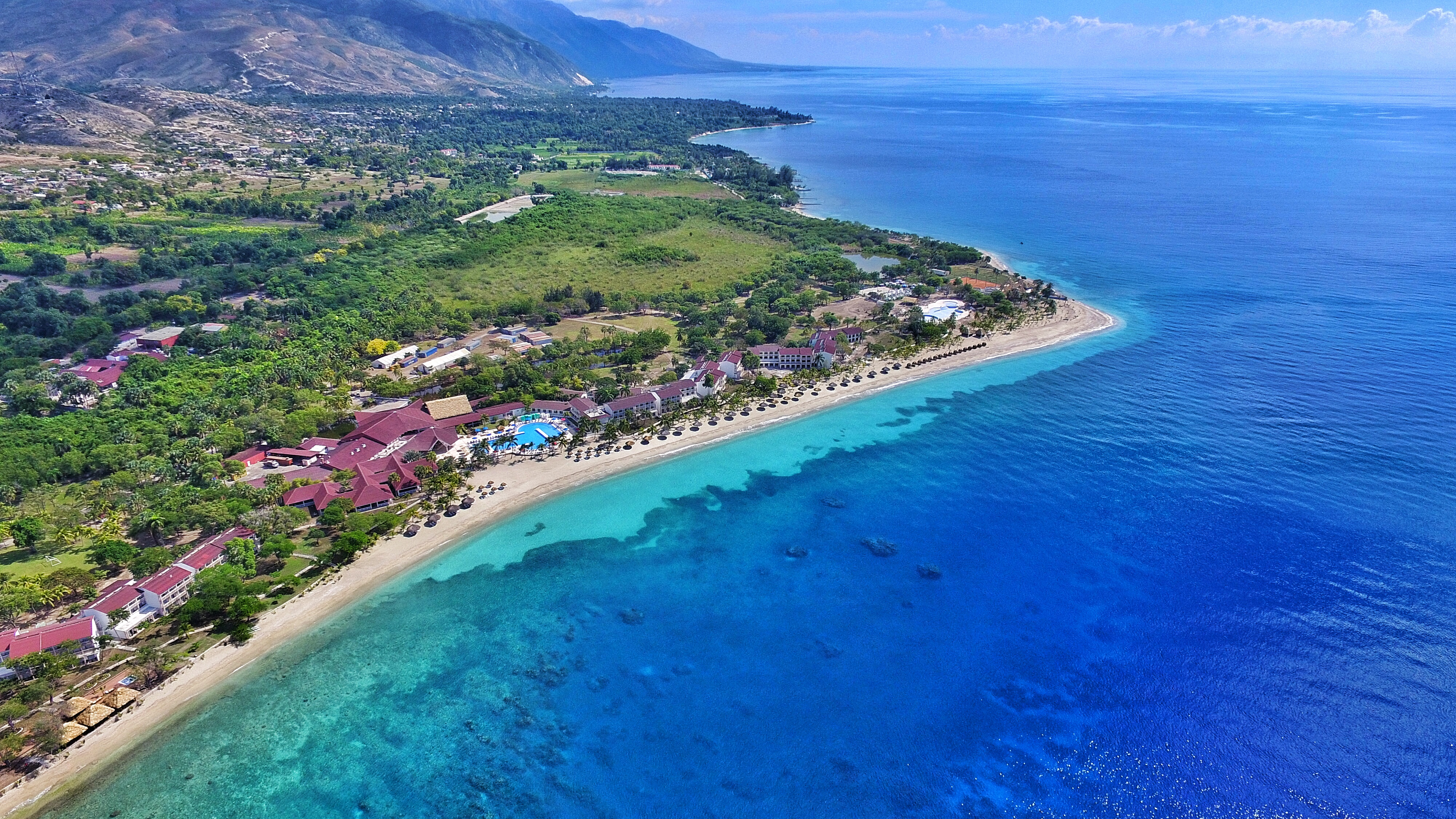
Saint-Marc Arrondissement

- Saint-Marc Arrondissement
  - La Chapelle
  - Saint-Marc
  - Verrettes
  - Montrouis
  - Liancourt
