= José de Guzmán, 1st Viscount of San Rafael de la Angostura =

Don José de Guzmán y Meléndez, 1st Viscount of San Rafael de la Angostura, 1st Baron of San Miguel de la Atalaya (c. 1740 in Hincha – 1792, in San Miguel de la Atalaya), was a cattle rancher, colonizer, and a peer of the Indies.

Guzmán was born in Hincha, in the Spanish colony of Santo Domingo, into a rich and powerful Criollo Spanish family; he was the son of José de Guzmán, who was mayor of Hincha in the 1730s, and María Meléndez. He married Gregoria de Luna y Andújar (daughter of Blas de Luna y Guzmán and Gregoria de Andújar y Valera), but had no children.

Guzmán was designated mayor of Hincha in 1765; he later founded within the lands of his family the village of San Miguel de la Atalaya in 1768, near the border with the French colony of Saint-Domingue. On 8 October 1778, King Charles III of Spain created Guzmán Baron of San Miguel de la Atalaya. In the 1780s, Guzmán made efforts to populate the Valley of Guaba with Canarian settlers and the Spanish Crown bestowed upon him the title of Viscount of San Rafael de la Angostura. Within the military, he had the rank of lieutenant colonel.

He died childless in 1792 in San Miguel de la Atalaya, his nephew José de Guzmán, 2nd Viscount of San Rafael de la Angostura, succeeded him; shortly later, after the Haitian occupation, the 2nd Viscount moved to Santiago de Cuba, Cuba.
