= Saint-Michel-de-l'Attalaye =

Saint-Michel-de-l'Attalaye Sen Michèl Latalay
- Commune
- Interactive map of Saint-Michel-de-l'Attalaye
- Location in Haiti
- Coordinates: 19°22′0″N 72°20′0″W
- Country: Haiti
- Department: Artibonite
- Arrondissement: Marmelade
- Founded in: 1768
- Founder: José de Guzmán y Meléndez, Viscount of San Rafael de la Angostura

Area
  - Total: 613.74 km^{2} (236.97 sq mi)
- Elevation: 420 m (1,380 ft)

Population (2015)
  - Total: 150,511
  - Density: 245.24/km^{2} (635.16/sq mi)
- Time zone: UTC−05:00 (EST)
  - Summer (DST): UTC−04:00 (EDT)
- Postal code: HT 4520

Saint-Michel-de-l'Attalaye (French pronunciation: [sɛ̃ miʃɛl də latalaj]; Haitian Creole: Sen Michèl Latalay) is a commune in the Marmelade Arrondissement, in the Artibonite department of Haiti. It has 95,216 inhabitants. It is the second largest city geographically after Port-au-Prince, the national capital. Located in the Central Plateau, it is home to several large Christian churches including one which has been there for over 50 years. It is a scenic locale, surrounded by rich farmland, abundant water resources and distant mountain peaks in every direction. There are excellent schools which are privately funded and a current (2011) small residential development outside of the main town area which is near completion which was originally sponsored by the central government. There is a new joint venture nearing completion with a Taiwanese partner that plans to bring bamboo crafts and goods manufacturing skills training to the local people.

The area is one of the least prone to earthquakes according to local government expertise. There is a new city hall nearing completion with excellent modern construction techniques and classic architecture (summer 2011).

== History ==
Saint-Michel-de-l'Atalaye was founded in 1768 as San Miguel de la Atalaya, on the grounds of the Estancia Marigallega by lieutenant-colonel José de Guzmán y Meléndez (who was later created Baron of San Miguel de la Atalaya by Charles III of Spain) and was populated by settlers from the Canary Islands. In 1773 the Treaty of San Miguel de la Atalaya was signed here by the governors of the Spanish colony of Santo Domingo and the French colony of Saint-Domingue. The Treaty created two committees to develop a boundary between the two colonies with reference to the rivers Dajabón and Pedernales.

In 1782 the population reached 1,131 inhabitants.

During the War of the First Coalition it was occupied by France in 1794. The following year, Spain formally ceded its portion of the island of Santo Domingo to France under the Peace of Basel. In 1809, Spain regained its former possessions in the island.

In December 1821 and January 1822, Haiti annexed areas of the central and northeastern part of the island; in February 1822 it annexed the city of Santo Domingo and the eastern side of the island. In 1844 the Dominicans proclaimed independence from Haiti, but Dominican control of the city was not very effective. As of the 1936 border treaty between Haiti and the Dominican Republic, the city was officially under Haitian control.
