= Jaraguá =

Jaraguá or Jaragua may refer to:

== Places ==
- Jaraguá, Goiás, a city in Brazil
- Jaraguá do Sul, a city in Santa Catarina State, Brazil
- Jaraguá (district of São Paulo), Brazil
- Villa Jaragua, a city in the Baoruco province, Dominican Republic
- Jaragua, Hispaniola, a cacicazgo in the island of Hispaniola

== Sports ==
- Associação Desportiva Jaraguá, a Brazilian futsal club
- Arena Jaraguá, an arena in Jaraguá do Sul, Brazil

== Other uses ==
- Jaraguá (CPTM), a railway station in the district of Jaraguá in São Paulo, Brazil
- Jaragua National Park, a national park in the Dominican Republic
- Pico do Jaraguá, a mountain in São Paulo, Brazil
- Hyparrhenia rufa or jaragua, a species of grass
