= Verrettes =

Verrettes Vèrèt
- Commune
- Interactive map of Verrettes
- Location in Haiti
- Coordinates: 19°3′0″N 72°28′0″W
- Country: Haiti
- Department: Artibonite
- Arrondissement: Saint-Marc
- Founded: 1727

Area
  - Total: 356.72 km^{2} (137.73 sq mi)
- Elevation: 72 m (236 ft)

Population (2015)
  - Total: 144,812
  - Density: 405.95/km^{2} (1,051.4/sq mi)
- Time zone: UTC−05:00 (EST)
  - Summer (DST): UTC−04:00 (EDT)
- Postal code: HT 4320

Verrettes (French pronunciation: [vɛʁɛt]; Haitian Creole: Vèrèt) is a commune in the Saint-Marc Arrondissement, in the Artibonite department of Haiti. It is located approximately 58 km north of the capital, Port-au-Prince, and has 144,812 inhabitants (2015).

- Settlements
- DesJardins
- Deschapelles
- Borel
- Désarmes
- Bastien

== History ==
Verrettes is also known as the birthplace of the late president Dumarsais Estimé. During his presidency, he made great efforts to modernize the commune of Verrettes by constructing the water distribution system of "Bassin Vincent", building streets with sidewalks, and a modern sewer system. Unfortunately, subsequent governments abandoned this urbanization work, as the pavement of some streets was not completed.

== Culture ==
The city of Verrettes has mostly been unaffected by Haiti's political turmoil and natural disasters. The small city is uneventful with a very low crime rate, but with an active nightlife. The city downtown is known for its live music, restaurants, clubs, and is also known as the playground for the town teenagers.

The city is very self-sufficient with most of the population consuming goods produced from nearby family farms in rural neighborhoods. Most of the formal businesses are owned by the city's upper middle class residence. Their homes are usually located near the downtown area; just like Port-au-Prince most of the upper-middle-class homes are surrounded by large cement walls with iron gates or some sort of fences.

Verrettes is mostly known for its strong emphasis on education; many rural town peasants relocate their children to Verrettes for their schooling, they usually rent houses and apartments in the town for their children to stay in. The middle and upper middle class residence are known for sending their children to Port-au-Prince to finish their studies. In the past few decades, there has been a large exodus of the upper middle class out of Haiti.

== Religion ==
At Verrettes "l’Eglise de la Nativité" (Church of Nativity) is still one of the largest churches of the country. The religion of the city is mainly Catholic & Protestant with a small percentage practicing Vodou.

== School ==
- Jardin D'enfants: Kindergartner
- La Providence: Primary School
- L'école Frere: Catholic School for Boys
- L'école Mere: Catholic School for Girls
- Charles Belair: Secondary School
- Indistrielle: Secondary School
- Lycée Garry: College Dumarsais Estimé
- Lycée Jacques Stephen et Alexis
- Centre de Formation Classique
- Centre D'etudes Secondaire des Verrettes
- Centre d'Etudes Secondaire de Deschapelles
- Ecole Mixte Gerald
- Ecole Mixte Pelerin de Deschapelles
- Institution Mixte Joseph C. Bernard
- institution Mixte Jean Piaget
- Institution Mixte Finotte Etienne
- institution Mixte Cerelus Pierre Glaude
- École professionnelle Dumarsais Estimé: Vocational school
- Academie St Robert Ecole Professionnelle :Vocational school

== Public Building ==
- Hôtel de Ville
- L'hôpital Dumarsais Estimé
- L'Église de la Nativité
- Salle de Royaume
- Hollywood Club
- Verrettes Cinema

== 2010 earthquake ==
The city's senator died in the 2010 Haiti earthquake.

La Providence is currently hosting 300 Jacmelien from the city of Jacmel displaced by the earthquake.
