= Battle of Ravine-à-Couleuvres =

1802 battle of the Haitian Revolution

- Part of the Saint-Domingue expedition
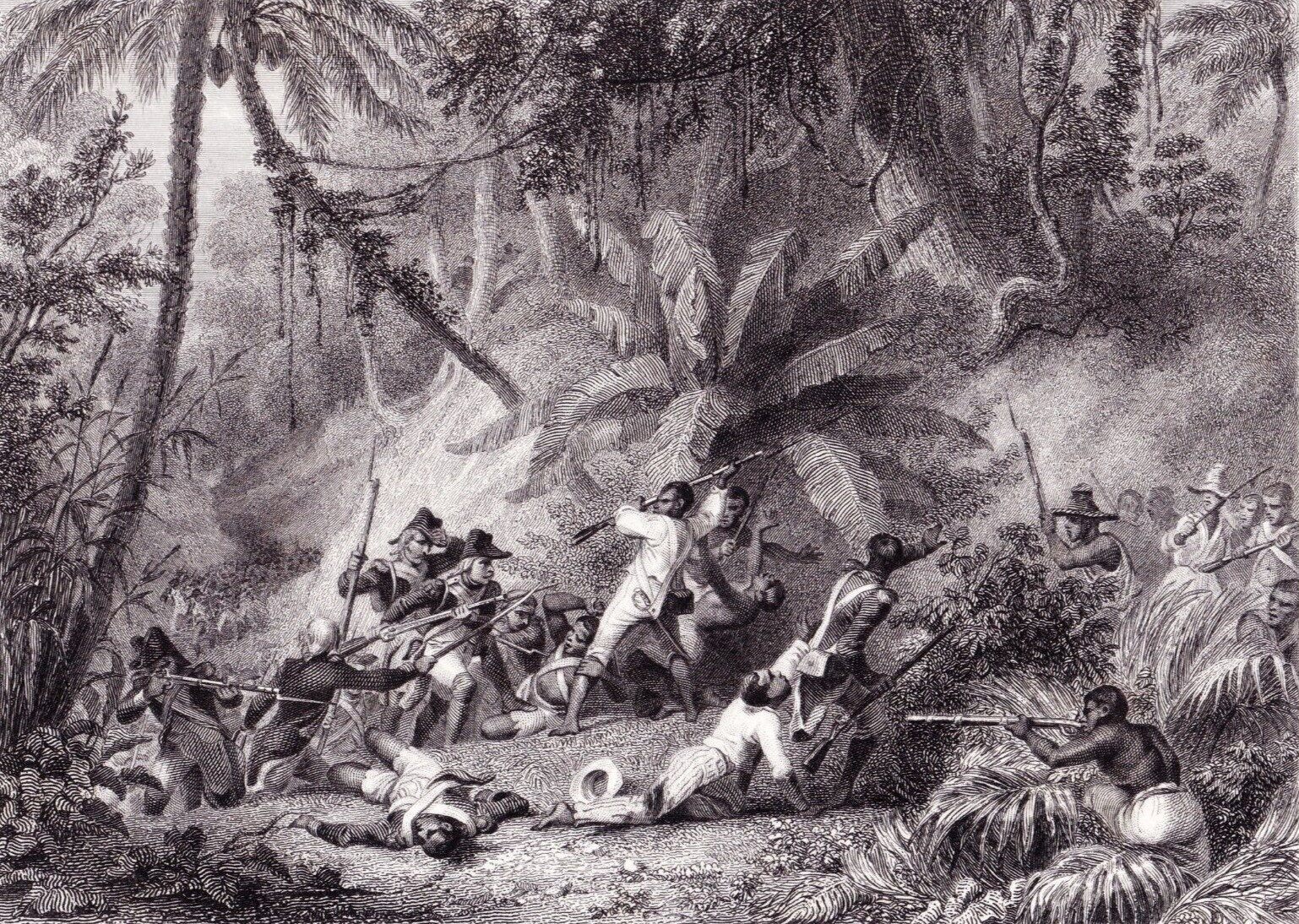
- Illustration of the battle by Karl Girardet
Date	23 February 1802
Location	Near Lacroix, Saint-Domingue 19.316°N 72.584°W
Result	French victory

Belligerents
France	Saint-Domingue

Commanders and leaders
Donatien de Rochambeau	Toussaint Louverture

Strength
3,000 infantry	2,500 infantry 400 cavalry

Casualties and losses
200 killed (Thomas Madiou)	800 killed (French claim); 300 killed (Thomas Madiou); Minor losses (Bell)

The Battle of Ravine-à-Couleuvres (Haitian Creole: Batay Ravin Koulèv), fought on 23 February 1802, was a major battle of the Saint-Domingue expedition during the Haitian Revolution.

A French division under General Donatien de Rochambeau was advancing down a ravine (the Ravine-à-Couleuvres), towards Lacroix, Artibonite, where they attacked the army of Toussaint Louverture. Louverture's forces consisted of 1,500 elite grenadiers, 1,000 grenadiers in different Demi-brigades, 400 dragoons. Louverture's forces resisted the attack strongly, but had to retreat across the Petite-Rivière after suffering 800 deaths.

In a statement made at the Fort de Joux, Louverture claimed that his forces consisted of 300 grenadiers and 60 cavalry, although other sources indicate that his forces contained over 3,000 regular infantry troops. However, it is almost certain that many of his forces - up to 2,000 men - were agricultural workers who joined the rebel forces. Louverture wrote that the French forces contained over 4,000 infantry soldiers, but according to the novelist and historian Madison Smartt Bell, Rochambeau probably landed at Fort-Liberté with 1,800 men, but not all of these would have marched on Gonaïves.

Prior to the battle on 22 February 1802, the French occupied the heights of Morne Barade and were attacked by rebel troops; the battle raged throughout the night and the French forces successfully resisted the attack. The following morning, the Haitian forces advanced out of the Ravine-à-Couleuvres as the French were travelling down it towards Lacroix, while Louverture rallied his cavalry. According to Bell, the losses of Louverture's army were minor.
