= Dessalines Arrondissement =

Coordinates: 19.2833°N 72.5°W

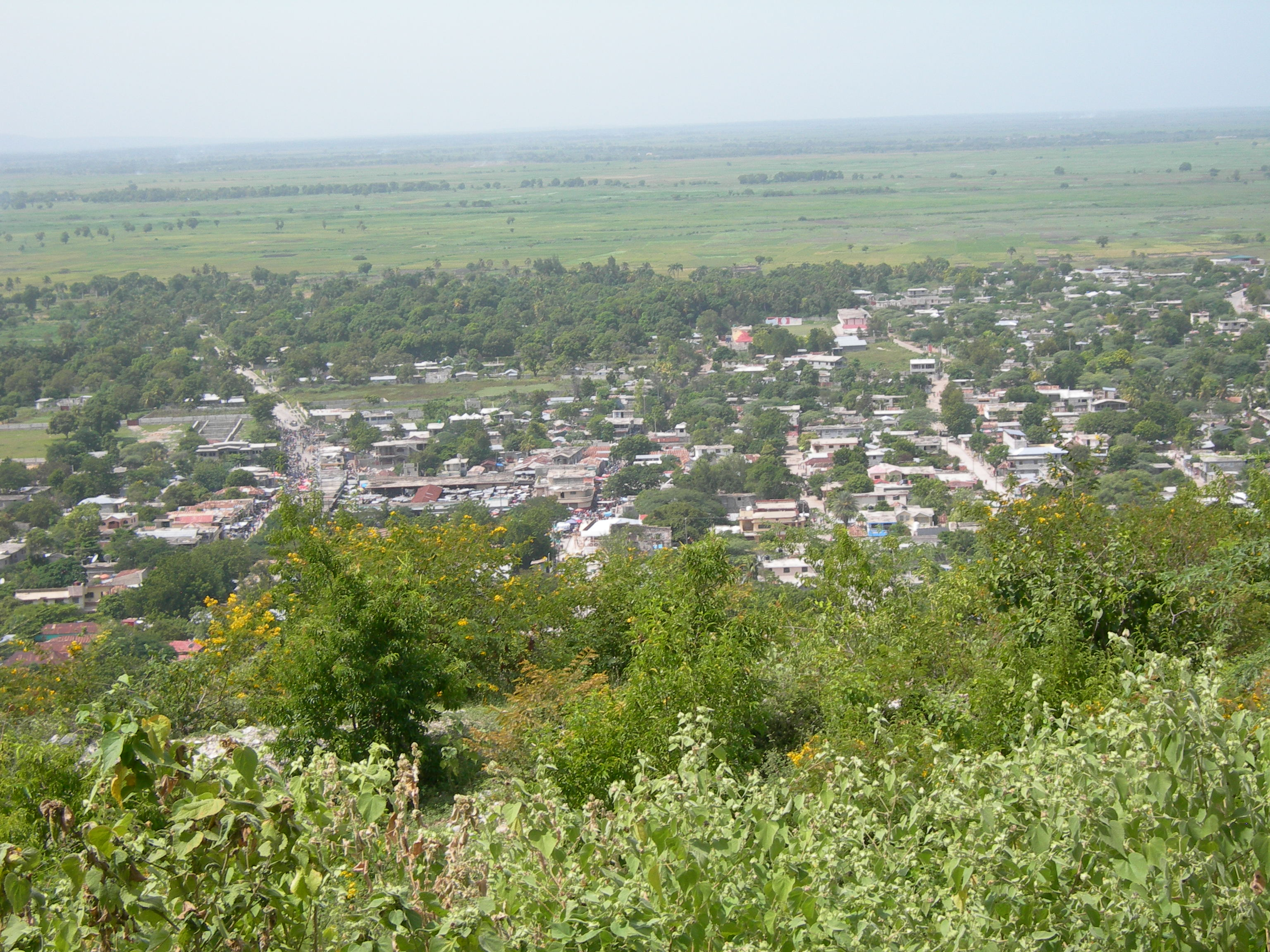
- Interactive map of Dessalines Arrondissement
- Country: Haiti

Area
  - Total: 1,132.46 km^{2} (437.25 sq mi)

Population
  - Total: 375,499
  - Density: 331.578/km^{2} (858.783/sq mi)

Dessalines (Haitian Creole: Desalin) is an arrondissement in the Artibonite department of Haiti.
