= Departments of Haiti =

First-level administrative territorial entity of Haiti

Departments of Haiti Départements d'Haïti (French)
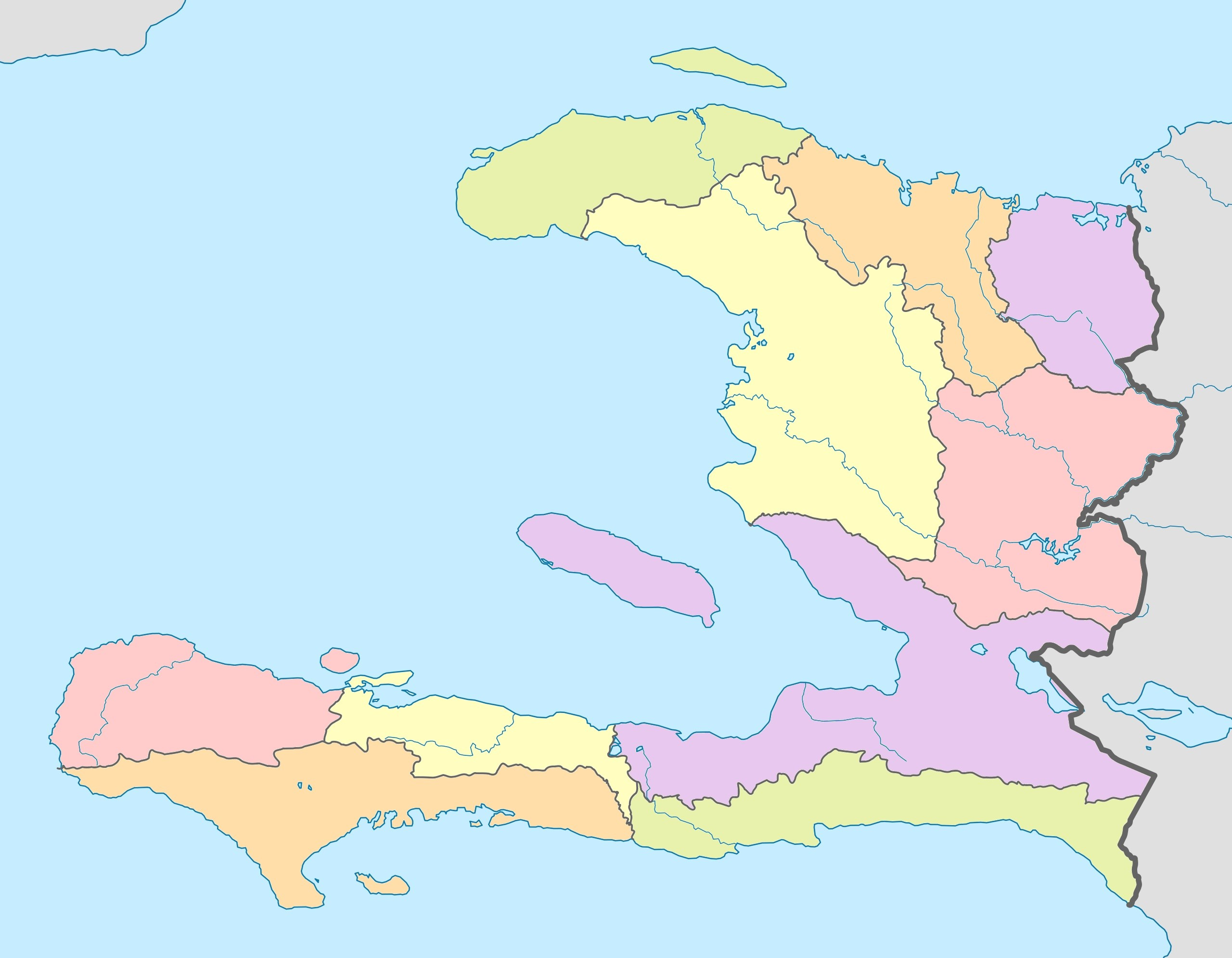
- Haiti's departments
- Category: Unitary state
- Location: Haiti
- Created: 1801
- Number: 10
- Populations: Nippes – lowest (342,525); Ouest – highest (4,029,246)
- Areas: Nippes – smallest (1,268 km^{2} (490 sq mi)); Artibonite – largest (4,984 km^{2} (1,924 sq mi))
- Subdivisions: Arrondissements, communes and communal sections

In the administrative divisions of Haiti, the department (French: département d'Haïti, pronounced [depaʁtəmɑ̃ d‿aiti]; Haitian Creole: depatman Ayiti) is the first of four levels of government. Haiti is divided administratively into ten departments, which are further subdivided into 42 arrondissements, 149 communes, and 574 communal sections as of 2021.

The Haitian government separately divides communes into villes, quartiers, and sections rurales to count urban and rural populations. Generally, each commune has one ville which serves as the administrative center and corresponds to the largest urban communal section. Quartiers are also counted as urban, but they are less populated and usually located in a different communal section.

In 2014, there was a proposal by the Chamber of Deputies to increase the number of departments from 10 to 14 —perhaps as high as 16.

== Administration ==
Each departments has a departmental council (conseil départemental) compound of three members elected by the departmental assembly for a 4-year term. The departmental council is led by a president (président). The council is the executive organ of the department.

Each department has a departmental assembly who assists the council in its work. The departmental assembly is the deliberative organ of the department. The members of the departmental assembly are also elected for 4 years. The departmental assembly is led by a president.

== History ==
Three departments have roots in the former French colony of Saint-Domingue, namely: the Nord, Sud, and Ouest. In 1801, under Governor-General Toussaint Louverture, the "provinces," became known as departments. The departement of l'Artibonite was known as departement of Louverture.

Under the administration of Dessalines the country was administrated by military divisions.

In 1821, Artibonite was created and in 1844, Nord-Ouest, both derived out of the Nord and Ouest departments. In 1962 during the reign of "Papa Doc" Duvalier, four new departments were created out of a territorial redistribution. These departments were: Centre, Grand'Anse, Nord-Ouest and Sud-Est. In 2003, a tenth department was created out of Grand'Anse, called Nippes.

In the 1990s, before the creation of Nippes, the dixième département was a phrase commonly used in regards to the Haitian diaspora. Since then, the phrase onzième département was soon adopted to describe the diaspora.

== Demographics ==
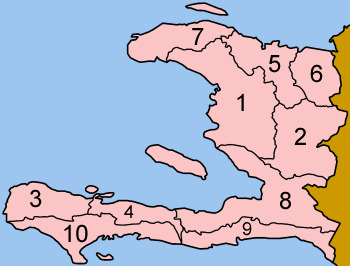
Departments of Haiti

Data based on 2015 estimates from the Haitian government.

Map	Department	Capital	Area (km^{2})	Population	Density (Pop./km^{2})	Planning Region
1	Artibonite	Gonaïves	4,987	1,727,524	350	Central
2	Centre	Hinche	3,487	746,236	210	Central
3	Grand'Anse	Jérémie	1,912	468,301	240	South
4	Nippes	Miragoâne	1,268	342,525	270	South
5	Nord	Cap-Haïtien	2,115	1,067,177	500	North
6	Nord-Est	Fort-Liberté	1,623	393,967	240	North
7	Nord-Ouest	Port-de-Paix	2,103	728,807	350	Central
8	Ouest	Port-au-Prince	4,983	4,029,705	810	West
9	Sud-Est	Jacmel	2,034	632,601	310	West
10	Sud	Les Cayes	2,654	774,976	290	South

== See also ==
- ISO 3166-2:HT
- Haiti
- Arrondissements of Haiti
- List of communes of Haiti
- List of departments of Haiti by Human Development Index
- List of West Indian first-level country subdivisions
