= Feuquerolles station =

Former French railway station

Feuquerolles
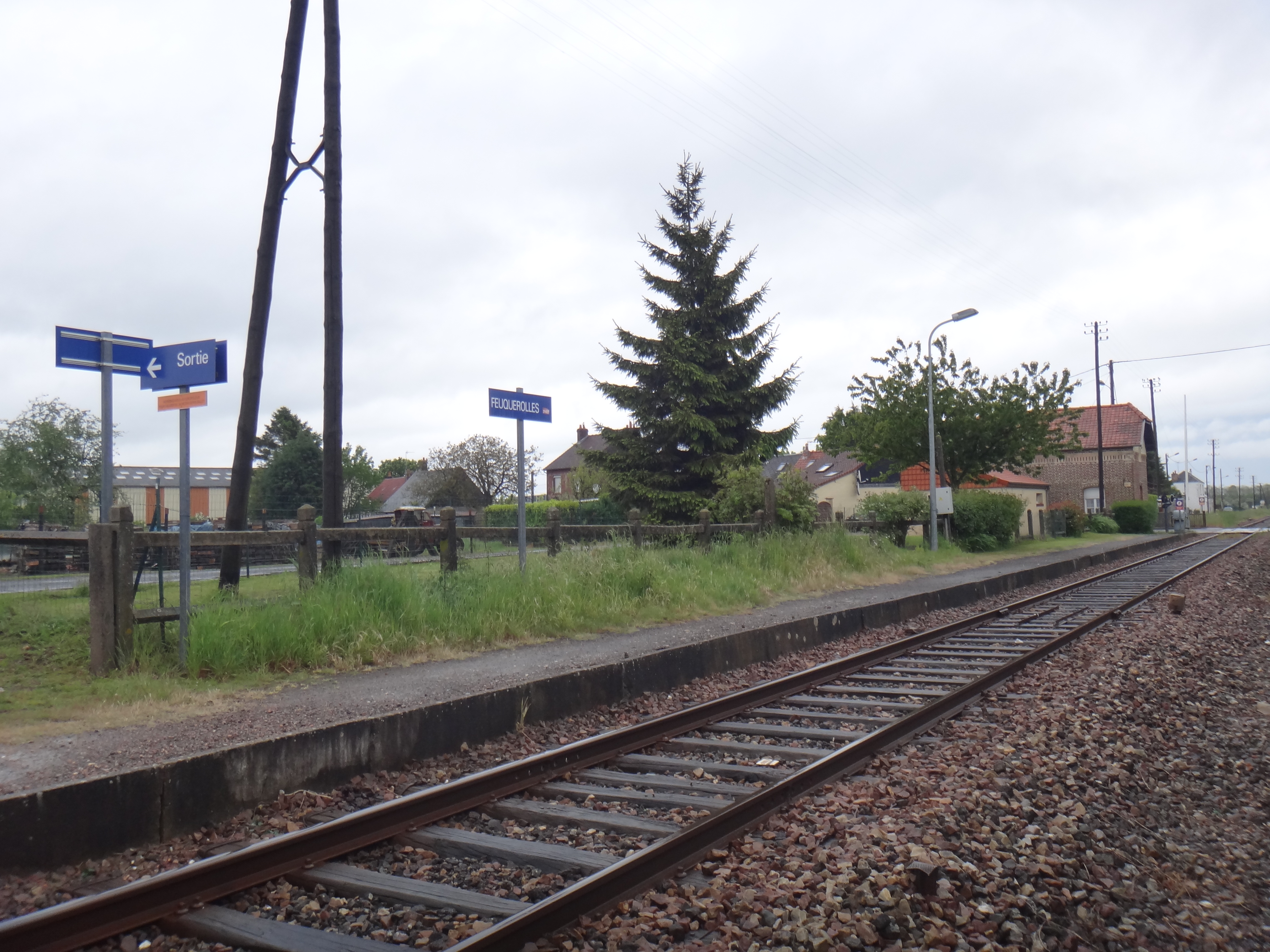

General information
- Location: rue Henri Barbusse; 80210 Feuquières-en-Vimeu
- Coordinates: 50°3′54″N 1°36′22″E
- Elevation: 100 m (330 ft)
- Owner: RFF/SNCF
- Line: Abbeville-Eu railway
- Platforms: 1
- Tracks: 1

Other information
- Station code: 87316752

History
- Opened: 1882
- Closed: 2018

Passengers
- 2007: fewer than 5 per day
Location

Feuquerolles is a former railway station located in the commune of Feuquières-en-Vimeu in the Somme department, France. The SNCF station was served by TER Hauts-de-France trains from Le Tréport-Mers to Abbeville. Train services were discontinued in 2018.

== The station ==
Feuquerolles is an unstaffed stop located at the 195.620 km point on the single-track Eu - Abbeville line, between Chépy-Valines and Feuquières-Fressenneville. The line opened on 4 December 1882. In 2008, the station was improved as part of a renewal of facilities on the entire line by the SNCF.

== See also ==
- List of SNCF stations in Hauts-de-France
