= Campagne =

Campagne (French pronunciation: [kɑ̃paɲ], meaning "countryside") may refer to several places:

== France ==
Campagne is the name or part of the name of several communes in France:

- Campagne, Dordogne, in the Dordogne department
- Campagne, Hérault, in the Hérault department
- Campagne, Landes, in the Landes department
- Campagne, Oise, in the Oise department
- Campagne, former commune of the Somme department, now part of Quesnoy-le-Montant
- Campagne-d'Armagnac, in the Gers department
- Campagne-lès-Boulonnais, in the Pas-de-Calais department
- Campagne-lès-Guines, in the Pas-de-Calais department
- Campagne-lès-Hesdin, in the Pas-de-Calais department
- Campagne-lès-Wardrecques, in the Pas-de-Calais department
- Campagne-sur-Arize, in the Ariège department
- Campagne-sur-Aude, in the Aude department
  - Gare de Campagne

== Haiti ==
- Campagne, Haiti, a rural settlement in the Jérémie commune

== Ireland ==
- Campagne (restaurant), Kilkenny

== Netherlands ==
- Campagne, a neighbourhood in Maastricht, Limburg province

== Surname ==
- Aleksi Campagne, Canadian singer-songwriter
- Carmen Campagne (1959–2018), Canadian singer and children's entertainer

== See also ==
- Pain de campagne, a French bread
