= Sanon =

Sanon may refer to:

== People ==
- Emmanuel Sanon (1951–2008), Haitian footballer known as Manno
- Issuf Sanon (born 1999), Ukrainian basketball player
- Jimmy-Shammar Sanon (born 1997), Haitian footballer
- Joson Sanon (born 2005), American basketball player
- Kriti Sanon (born 1990), Indian actress
- Nupur Sanon, Indian actress
- Roosevelt Sanon (born 1951), Haitian artist
- Thomas Sanon (born 1947), Burkinabé politician and diplomat
- Tudor Sanon (born 1984), Haitian taekwondo athlete
- Valentin Sanon (born 1980), Ivorian tennis player

== See also ==
- S-Anon, an organization for families of sex addicts
- Carrefour Sanon, a rural settlement in Haiti
