= Gérandale Télusma =

Haitian politician (1972–2010)

Member of the Chamber of Deputies for Gros Morne
- In office 21 April 2006 – 20 December 2010
- Preceded by: Marcson Erdain
- Succeeded by: Fritz Chéry

Personal details
- Born: 27 October 1972 Gros Morne, Haiti
- Died: 20 December 2010 (aged 38) Desdunes, Haiti
- Party: Mochrenha
- Education: State University of Haiti

Gérandale Télusma (27 October 1972 – 20 December 2010) was a Haitian lawyer and politician who served in the Chamber of Deputies of Haiti from 2006 until her death in 2010. A member of the Christian Movement for a New Haiti party, she represented Gros Morne in the legislature. During her tenure, Télusma had a significant role in increasing the minimum wage, and was considered to be one of Haiti's most prominent advocates for women.

== Biography ==
Gérandale Télusma was born on 27 October 1972 in Gros Morne, Haiti. She was raised in a single-parent household, as her father had abandoned the family before she was born. Her mother, Renette Thélusma, was a teacher. According to Télusma, the "H" in her surname had been removed by a civil service officer. Télusma was very close with her mother and grew up in Gros Morne, completing a substantial portion of her initial education in the town. For her secondary education, she attended the Lycée Marie-Jeanne in Port-au-Prince, graduating with a baccalaureate in 1992. Following this, she began pursuing a legal education, studying at the State University of Haiti and receiving a degree in legal science. Télusma went on to work as a lawyer at the Haitian National Police and the National Palace.

In the 2006 Haitian general election, Télusma was elected to the Chamber of Deputies, representing Gros Morne as a member of the Christian Movement for a New Haiti party. She was recruited to run by several prominent citizens of Gros Morne, who wished to be represented in the legislature by a woman. During her tenure, Télusma held several prominent positions, particularly becoming the secretary of the Chamber of Deputies. She was also the chairman of the Social Affairs and Women’s Rights Committee; in this position, Télusma led the reformation of Haiti's adoption laws. In 2009, she served as the chairman of a special commission tasked with drafting legislation to increase the minimum wage. Télusma was initially a proponent of increasing the minimum wage to 200 gourdes (4.85 USD) a day, up from 90 gourdes (2.18 USD); however, following objections from President René Préval, a compromise was passed, increasing the minimum wage to 125 gourdes (3.03 USD) per day for manufacturing jobs and 200 gourdes per day for commercial jobs. Télusma is regarded as having been one of the most prominent advocates for "raising female leadership" in Haiti.

Télusma ran for re-election in the 2010–11 Haitian general election, facing journalist Fritz Chéry of the Haiti in Action party. However, in the early morning of 20 December 2010, Télusma was killed in a car accident when the vehicle she had been travelling in lost control and "violently collided" with a parked bus on National road 1. The other three passengers, one of whom was her uncle, were critically injured. Télusma was 38 at the time of her death. Among those who paid tribute following her death were Edmond Mulet, the head of the United Nations Stabilisation Mission in Haiti, who stated that her death was "a great loss for Haitian women and for the nation"; Jocelyn Lassègue, a government minister and close ally of Télusma, who stated that her death was a "cataclysm"; and President Préval, who expressed condolences.
