= Quesnoy-le-Montant station =

Former French railway station

Quesnoy-le-Montant
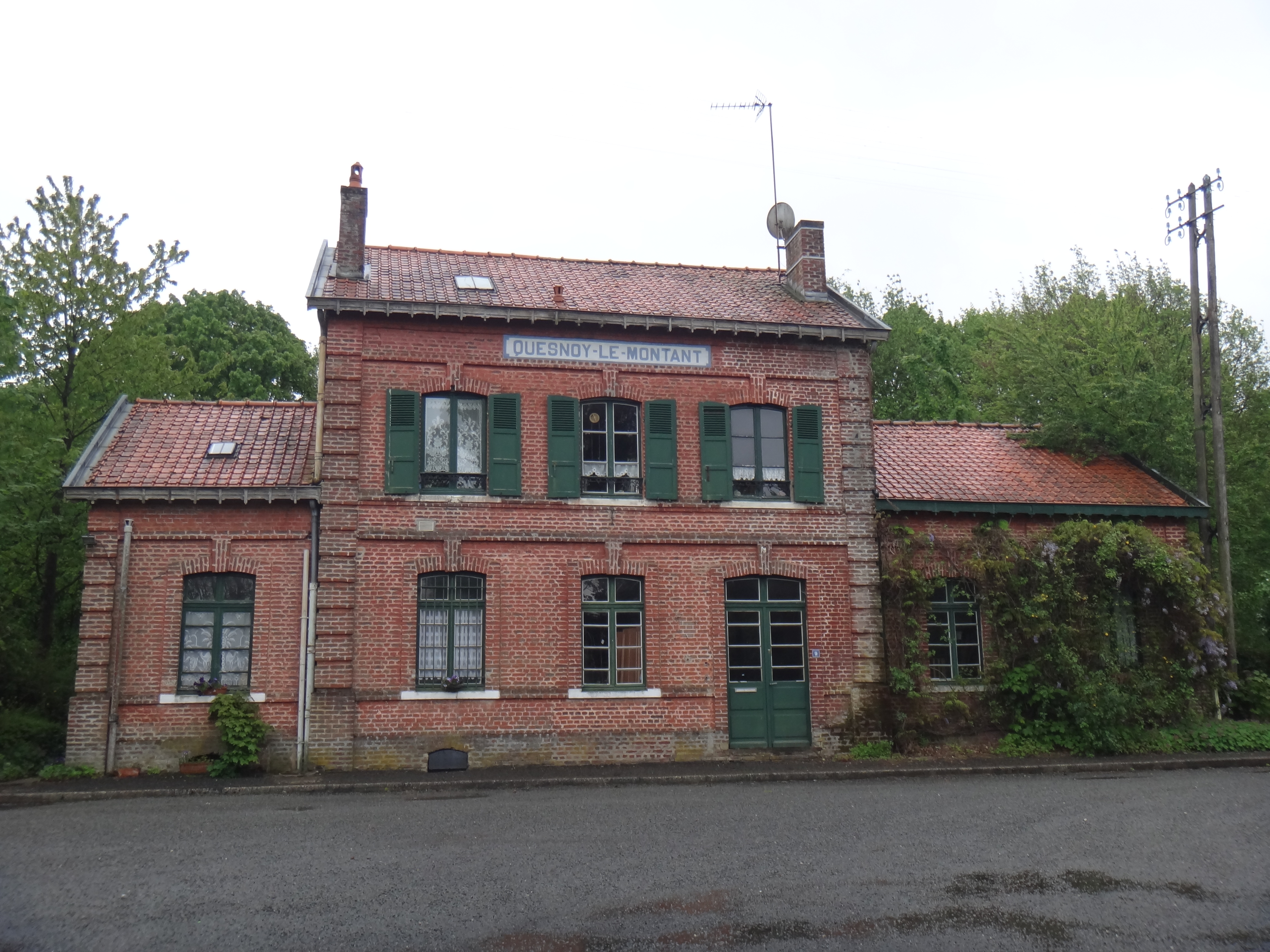
- Station building in 2014.

General information
- Location: La Gare; 80132 Quesnoy-le-Montant
- Coordinates: 50°6′32″N 1°42′9″E
- Owner: RFF/SNCF
- Line: Abbeville–Eu railway
- Platforms: 1
- Tracks: 1

Other information
- Station code: 87317487

History
- Opened: 1873 (the opening of the line)
- Closed: 2018
Location

Quesnoy-le-Montant is a former railway station located in the hamlet of Saint-Sulpice, in the commune of Quesnoy-le-Montant in the Somme department, France. The station was served by TER Hauts-de-France trains from Le Tréport-Mers to Abbeville (line 25). Its elevation is 20 metres (66 ft).

== Location ==
The line is at km 186.636 on the Abbeville–Eu railway between Abbeville and Acheux-Franleu. Four old stations between the station and Abbeville are now closed: Faubourg-de-Rouvroy, Cambron-Laviers, Gouy-Cahon and Cahon.

== History ==
The line from Paris to Le Tréport via Amiens and Abbeville was first opened in 1873. The station underwent renovations in 2008. Train services were discontinued in 2018.

== See also ==
- List of SNCF stations in Hauts-de-France
