= St. Louis King of France Cathedral, Jérémie =

Coordinates: 18.6447°N 74.1146°W

St. Louis King of France Cathedral
- Cathédrale Saint-Louis-Roi-de-France de Jérémie
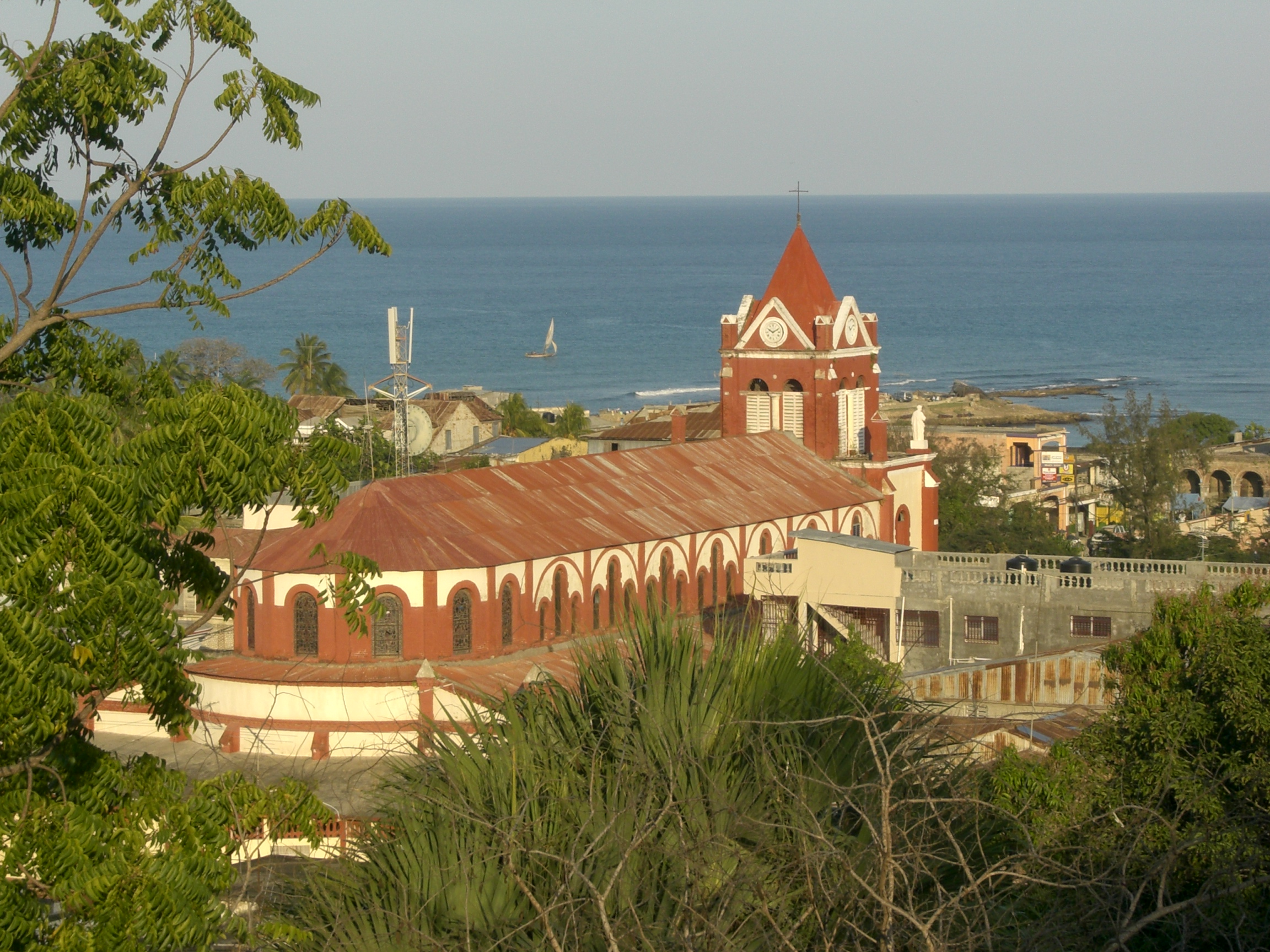
- St. Louis King of France Cathedral
- Location: Jérémie
- Country: Haiti
- Denomination: Roman Catholic Church
- Sui iuris church: Latin Church

History
- Status: Active

Architecture
- Functional status: Cathedral
- Completed: 1901

Administration
- Diocese: Diocese of Jérémie

The St. Louis King of France Cathedral (French: Cathédrale Saint-Louis-Roi-de-France de Jérémie) is a religious building belonging to the Catholic Church and is located in the town of Jérémie in the Caribbean and island country of Haiti.

In Jérémie an ancient temple was destroyed in a fire that occurred in 1874. In 1877 it was decided to rebuild a parish church. In 1879, a credit of 30,000 gourdes passed by the House of Representatives allowed support its reconstruction. The works came to an end in 1901. The church was dedicated to St. Louis King of France (also known as Louis IX of France and Ludovico). On April 20, 1972, the Diocese of Jérémie was created with the division of the diocese of Les Cayes. That is when Jérémie church became a cathedral.

The Cathedral sustained extensive damage in 2016 due to Hurricane Matthew.

The Cathedral was once again damaged on August 14, 2021 as a result of the 2021 Haiti earthquake, the extent of which is not known yet. Satellite imagery shows that at the very least the tower is gone.

== See also ==
- Roman Catholicism in Haiti
- St. Louis King of France Cathedral
