= La Coude =

- Rural settlement
- Location in Haiti
- Coordinates: 18°33′18″N 74°19′16″W
- Country: Haiti
- Department: Grand'Anse
- Arrondissement: Jérémie
- Elevation: 226 m (741 ft)

La Coude (French pronunciation: [la kud]) is a rural settlement in the Chambellan commune of the Jérémie Arrondissement, in the Grand'Anse department of Haiti.
