= Sassier =

- Village
- Location in Haiti
- Coordinates: 18°34′59″N 74°7′16″W
- Country: Haiti
- Department: Grand'Anse
- Arrondissement: Jérémie
- Elevation: 256 m (840 ft)

Sassier is a village in the Jérémie commune of the Jérémie Arrondissement, in the Grand'Anse department of Haiti.
