= Rampe des Lions =

- Village
- Location in Haiti
- Coordinates: 18°28′57″N 74°6′0″W
- Country: Haiti
- Department: Grand'Anse
- Arrondissement: Jérémie
- Elevation: 1,094 m (3,589 ft)

Rampe des Lions is a village in the Jérémie commune of the Jérémie Arrondissement, in the Grand'Anse department of Haiti.
