= Babino, Grand'Anse =

Babino
- Rural settlement
- Location in Haiti
- Coordinates: 18°30′1″N 74°22′5″W
- Country: Haiti
- Department: Grand'Anse
- Arrondissement: Jérémie
- Elevation: 230 m (750 ft)

Babino is a rural settlement in the Chambellan commune of the Jérémie Arrondissement, in the Grand'Anse department of Haiti.
