= Cadette, Haiti =

Cadette ,Village in Grand'Anse, Haiti

- Village
- Location in Haiti
- Coordinates: 18°33′0″N 74°18′40″W
- Country: Haiti
- Department: Grand'Anse
- Arrondissement: Jérémie
- Elevation: 76 m (249 ft)

Cadette (French pronunciation: [kadɛt]) is a village in the Chambellan commune in the Jérémie Arrondissement, in the Grand'Anse department of Haiti.
