= Morne Bijote =

- Village
- Location in Haiti
- Coordinates: 18°37′33″N 74°16′55″W
- Country: Haiti
- Department: Grand'Anse
- Arrondissement: Jérémie
- Elevation: 161 m (528 ft)

Morne Bijote is a village in the Abricots commune of the Jérémie Arrondissement, in the Grand'Anse department of Haiti.
