= Previle =

Previle may refer to:

- Previle (former municipality), Yugoslavia
- Previle, Haiti
