= Sources Chaudes =

- Communal section
- Location in Haiti
- Coordinates: 18°29′2″N 74°17′15″W
- Country: Haiti
- Department: Grand'Anse
- Arrondissement: Jérémie
- Elevation: 140 m (460 ft)

Sources Chaudes (French pronunciation: [suʁs ʃod]) is a communal section in the Moron commune of the Jérémie Arrondissement, in the Grand'Anse department of Haiti. It is situated along the Rivière Bois Mahot, and lies 143 meters above sea level; the community itself residing in a basin between several of the local mountains.
