= Desarmeaux =

- Village
- Location in Haiti
- Coordinates: 18°37′42″N 74°14′06″W
- Country: Haiti
- Department: Grand'Anse
- Arrondissement: Jérémie
- Elevation: 120 m (390 ft)

Desarmeaux is a village in the Bonbon commune of the Jérémie Arrondissement, in the Grand'Anse department of Haiti.
