= Dayere =

- Village
- Location in Haiti
- Coordinates: 18°30′39″N 74°11′16″W
- Country: Haiti
- Department: Grand'Anse
- Arrondissement: Jérémie
- Elevation: 368 m (1,207 ft)

Dayere is a village in the Jérémie commune of the Jérémie Arrondissement, in the Grand'Anse department of Haiti.
