= Lenaire =

- Rural settlement
- Location in Haiti
- Coordinates: 18°34′11″N 74°17′8″W
- Country: Haiti
- Department: Grand'Anse
- Arrondissement: Jérémie
- Elevation: 210 m (690 ft)

Lenaire is a rural settlement in the Moron commune of the Jérémie Arrondissement, in the Grand'Anse department of Haiti.
