= Plik =

- Village
- Location in Haiti
- Coordinates: 18°31′43″N 74°14′16″W
- Country: Haiti
- Department: Grand'Anse
- Arrondissement: Jérémie
- Elevation: 206 m (676 ft)

Plik is a village in the Moron commune of the Jérémie Arrondissement, in the Grand'Anse department of Haiti.
