= Duranton =

- Rural settlement
- Location in Haiti
- Coordinates: 18°33′1″N 74°8′58″W
- Country: Haiti
- Department: Grand'Anse
- Arrondissement: Jérémie
- Elevation: 279 m (915 ft)

Duranton is a rural settlement in the Jérémie commune of the Jérémie Arrondissement, in the Grand'Anse department of Haiti.
