= Poyrette =

- Village
- Location in Haiti
- Coordinates: 18°38′2″N 74°18′57″W
- Country: Haiti
- Department: Grand'Anse
- Arrondissement: Jérémie
- Elevation: 24 m (79 ft)

Poyrette is a village in the Abricots commune of the Jérémie Arrondissement, in the Grand'Anse department of Haiti.
