= Anse Josep =

- Village
- Location in Haiti
- Coordinates: 18°38′50″N 74°20′5″W
- Country: Haiti
- Department: Grand'Anse
- Arrondissement: Jérémie
- Elevation: 56 m (184 ft)

Anse Josep is a village in the Abricots commune of the Jérémie Arrondissement, in the Grand'Anse department of Haiti.
