= Anse du Clerc =

- Communal section
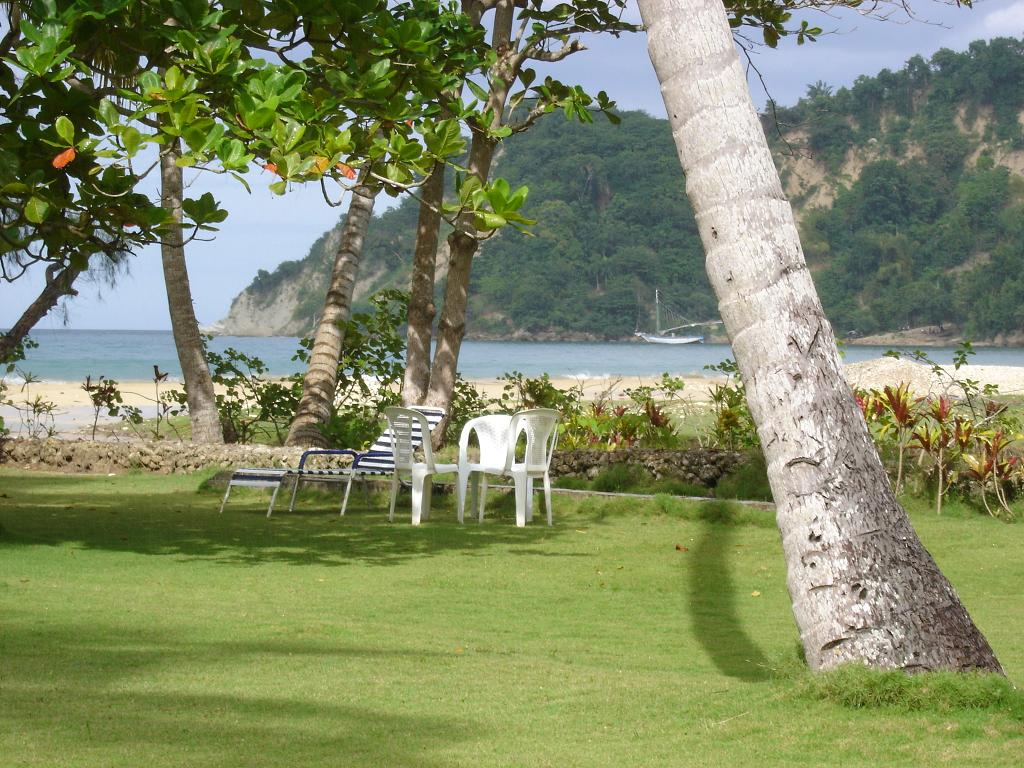

- Location in Haiti
- Coordinates: 18°38′51″N 74°16′43″W
- Country: Haiti
- Department: Grand'Anse
- Arrondissement: Jérémie

Area
  - Total: 20.35 km^{2} (7.86 sq mi)
- Elevation: 10 m (33 ft)

Population (March 2015)
  - Total: 8,363
  - Density: 411/km^{2} (1,060/sq mi)

Anse du Clerc (French pronunciation: [ɑ̃s dy klɛʁ]) is a communal section in the Abricots commune, in the Jérémie Arrondissement, in the Grand'Anse department of Haiti.
