= Marche Leon =

- Rural settlement
- Location in Haiti
- Coordinates: 18°33′5″N 74°7′21″W
- Country: Haiti
- Department: Grand'Anse
- Arrondissement: Jérémie
- Elevation: 163 m (535 ft)

Marche Leon is a rural settlement in the Jérémie commune of the Jérémie Arrondissement, in the Grand'Anse department of Haiti.
