= Latitte =

- Village
- Location in Haiti
- Coordinates: 18°35′26″N 74°20′20″W
- Country: Haiti
- Department: Grand'Anse
- Arrondissement: Jérémie
- Elevation: 322 m (1,056 ft)

Latitte is a village in the Abricots commune of the Jérémie Arrondissement, in the Grand'Anse department of Haiti.
