= Grande-Anse River =

Coordinates: 18°37′7.52″N 74°7′35.4″W

Grande Anse River
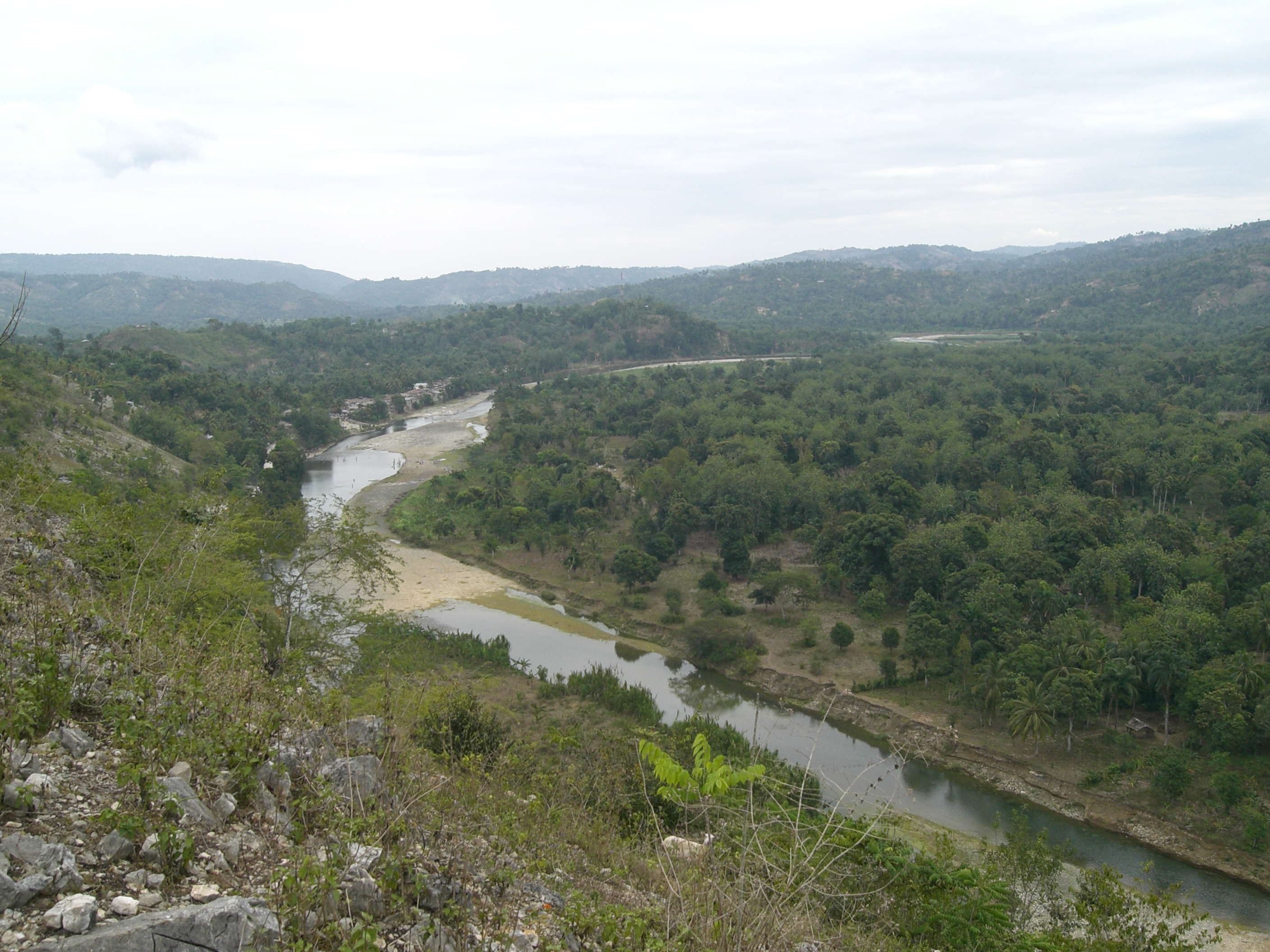

Location
- Country: Haiti
- Department: Grand'Anse
- Commune: Jérémie, Moron

Physical characteristics
- Source: Belzanine
  - location: Moron, Grand'Anse, Haiti
- Mouth: Gulf of Gonâve
- Length: 22 mi (35 km)
- Discharge
  - location: mouth

Basin features
- Tributaries
  - left: Rivière Bras Gauche, Rivière Maro
  - right: Rivière Bras Droite

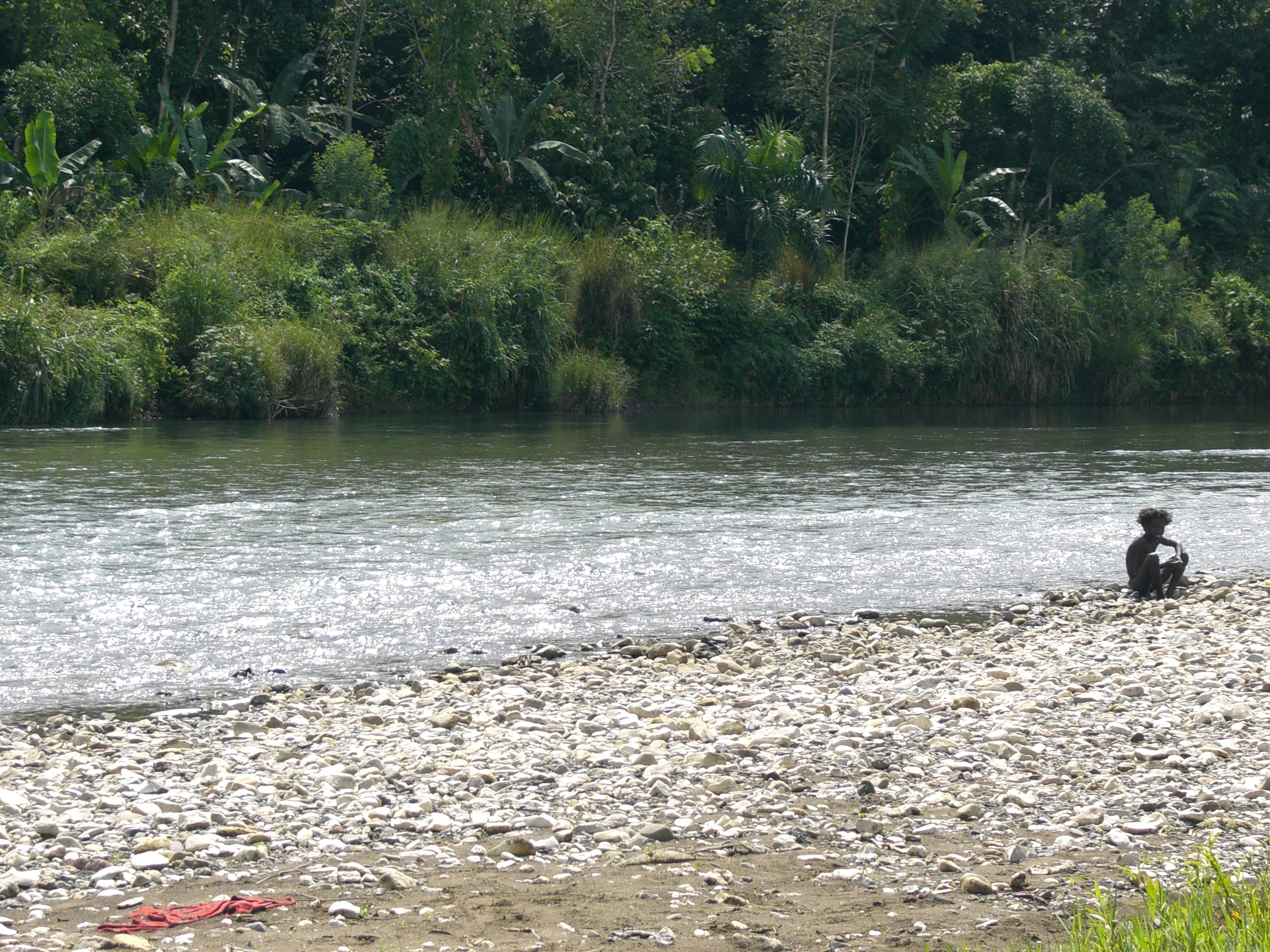
Grand-Anse River (2005)

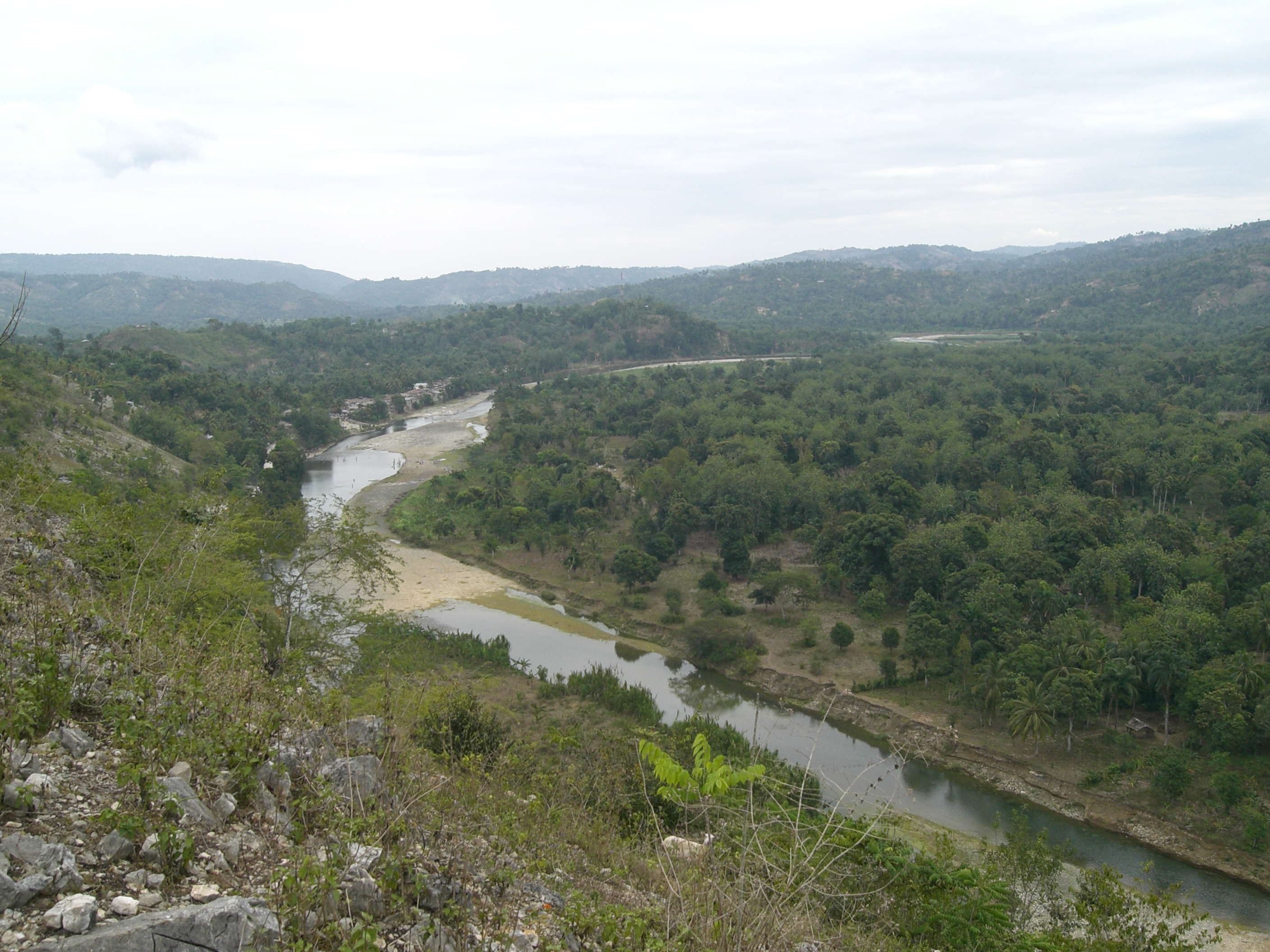
Grand-Anse River (2005)

The Grande-Anse River (French: Rivière de la Grande-Anse [ʁivjɛʁ də la ɡʁɑ̃dɑ̃s]) flows through western Haiti and empties into the Gulf of Gonâve at the city of Jérémie. It is one of the largest rivers in Haiti.

It is also one of the most dangerous rivers in Haiti. Many people died trying to cross the river by truck in the last decades. Most recently, bridges have been constructed over the river linking Aux-Cayes in the south department to Jeremie in the Grand'Anse department.
