= Leopold, Haiti =

Leopold
- Village
- Location in Haiti
- Coordinates: 18°34′53″N 74°13′12″W
- Country: Haiti
- Department: Grand'Anse
- Arrondissement: Jérémie
- Elevation: 36 m (118 ft)

Leopold is a village in the Jérémie commune of the Jérémie Arrondissement, in the Grand'Anse department of Haiti.
