= Sajote =

- Village
- Location in Haiti
- Coordinates: 18°37′03″N 74°22′53″W
- Country: Haiti
- Department: Grand'Anse
- Arrondissement: Jérémie
- Elevation: 80 m (260 ft)

Sajote is a village in the Abricots commune of the Jérémie Arrondissement, in the Grand'Anse department of Haiti.
