= Saint-Victor, Haiti =

Saint-Victor
- Village
- Location in Haiti
- Coordinates: 18°36′51″N 74°21′05″W
- Country: Haiti
- Department: Grand'Anse
- Arrondissement: Jérémie
- Elevation: 156 m (512 ft)
- Time zone: UTC-05:00 (EST)
  - Summer (DST): UTC-04:00 (EDT)

Saint-Victor is a village in the Abricots commune of the Jérémie Arrondissement, in the Grand'Anse department of Haiti.
