= La Forêt =

La Forêt may refer to:

== Places ==
=== France ===
- La Forêt (Creuse), former commune of département Creuse today part of Montboucher
- La Forêt (Puy-de-Dôme), former commune of Puy-de-Dôme, today part of Cisternes-la-Forêt
- La Forêt-Auvray, Orne
- La Forêt-Fouesnant, Finistère
- La Forêt-du-Parc, Eure
- La Forêt-le-Roi, Essonne
- La Forêt-Sainte-Croix, Essonne
- La Forêt-sur-Sèvre, Deux-Sèvres
- La Forêt-du-Temple, Creuse
- La Forêt-de-Tessé, Charente

=== Guernsey ===
- La Forêt, Guernsey (The Forest), a parish in Guernsey

=== Haiti ===
- La Forêt, Haiti, a rural settlement in the Grand'Anse department of Haiti

== Arts ==
- La Forêt (2014 film), a 2014 television film by Arnaud Desplechin adapted from the Russian play by Ostrovski
- The Forest (TV series), 2017 French television series
- La Forêt, 1987 opera by Rolf Liebermann
- La Forêt (album), 2005 album by Xiu Xiu

== See also ==
- Laforêt (disambiguation)
- The Forest
