= Lori, Haiti =

Lori
- Village
- Location in Haiti
- Coordinates: 18°31′36″N 74°13′29″W
- Country: Haiti
- Department: Grand'Anse
- Arrondissement: Jérémie
- Elevation: 295 m (968 ft)

Lori is a village in the Jérémie commune of the Jérémie Arrondissement, in the Grand'Anse department of Haiti.
