= L'Homond =

Village in the Grand'Anse department of Haiti

- Village
- Location in Haiti
- Coordinates: 18°37′52″N 74°18′30″W
- Country: Haiti
- Department: Grand'Anse
- Arrondissement: Jérémie
- Elevation: 18 m (59 ft)

L'Homond is a village in the Abricots commune of the Jérémie Arrondissement, in the Grand'Anse department of Haiti.
