= La Roche, Haiti =

La Roche
- Rural settlement
- Location in Haiti
- Coordinates: 18°31′25″N 74°15′25″W
- Country: Haiti
- Department: Grand'Anse
- Arrondissement: Jérémie
- Elevation: 236 m (774 ft)

La Roche is a rural settlement in the Moron commune of the Jérémie Arrondissement, in the Grand'Anse department of Haiti.
