= Beaudrouin =

- Rural settlement
- Location in Haiti
- Coordinates: 18°35′10″N 74°5′25″W
- Country: Haiti
- Department: Grand'Anse
- Arrondissement: Jérémie
- Elevation: 119 m (390 ft)

Beaudrouin is a rural settlement in the Jérémie commune in the Jérémie Arrondissement, in the Grand'Anse department of Haiti.
