= Louissant =

- Village
- Location in Haiti
- Coordinates: 18°34′58″N 74°20′52″W
- Country: Haiti
- Department: Grand'Anse
- Arrondissement: Jérémie
- Elevation: 400 m (1,300 ft)

Louissant is a village in the Abricots commune of the Jérémie Arrondissement, in the Grand'Anse department of Haiti.
