= Acheux—Franleu station =

Railway station in Chépy, France

Acheux—Franleu

General information
- Location: Route départementale 80; 80210 Chépy; Somme; France
- Coordinates: 50°04′57″N 1°39′26″E
- Owner: SNCF
- Line: Abbeville—Eu railway
- Platforms: 1
- Tracks: 1

Other information
- Station code: 87316745

History
- Opened: 1873
- Closed: 2018
Location

Acheux—Franleu station (French: Gare d'Archeux—Franleu) is a former railway station in Chépy and near Acheux-en-Vimeu and Franleu, Hauts-de-France, France. The station opened in 1873 and is located on the Abbeville-Eu railway. The station was served by TER (local) services between Abbeville and Le Tréport operated by SNCF. Train services were discontinued in 2018.
