= Chambellan =

Chambellan Chanbèlan
- Commune
- Interactive map of Chambellan
- Location in Haiti
- Coordinates: 18°34′0″N 74°19′0″W
- Country: Haiti
- Department: Grand'Anse
- Arrondissement: Jérémie

Area
  - Total: 73.13 km^{2} (28.24 sq mi)
- Elevation: 307 m (1,007 ft)

Population (2015)
  - Total: 26,459
  - Density: 361.8/km^{2} (937.1/sq mi)
- Time zone: UTC−05:00 (EST)
  - Summer (DST): UTC−04:00 (EDT)
- Postal code: HT 7150

Chambellan (French pronunciation: [ʃɑ̃bɛlɑ̃]; Haitian Creole: Chanbèlan) is a commune in the Jérémie Arrondissement, in the Grand'Anse department of Haiti. It has 26,459 inhabitants in 2015.

Villages located within the commune include: Babino, Cadette, Grande Plaine, Granger, La Coude and Laterriere.
