= Campanhã station =

Campanhã station may refer to:

- Campanhã railway station, the principal railway station for the city of Porto, Portugal
- Campanhã station (Porto Metro), a station on the Porto Metro in the city of Porto, Portugal

== See also ==
- Campagna station (disambiguation)
- Campagne station
