= La Forêt, Haiti =

La Forêt
- Rural settlement
- Location in Haiti
- Coordinates: 18°37′25″N 74°11′30″W
- Country: Haiti
- Department: Grand'Anse
- Arrondissement: Jérémie
- Elevation: 493 m (1,617 ft)

La Forêt is a rural settlement in the Jérémie commune of the Jérémie Arrondissement, in the Grand'Anse department of Haiti.
