= Campagne, Haiti =

Campagne
- Rural settlement
- Location in Haiti
- Coordinates: 18°32′6″N 74°11′58″W
- Country: Haiti
- Department: Grand'Anse
- Arrondissement: Jérémie
- Elevation: 204 m (669 ft)

Campagne (French pronunciation: [kɑ̃paɲ]) is a rural settlement in the Jérémie commune of the Jérémie Arrondissement, in the Grand'Anse department of Haiti.
