= Campagna station =

Campagna station may refer to:

- Cerignola Campagna railway station, a railway station in Cerignola, Foggia, Apulia, Italy
- Madonna di Campagna railway station, a railway station in Turin, Piedmont, Italy

== See also ==
- Campanhã station (disambiguation)
- Campagne station
