= Previle, Haiti =

Previle
- Rural settlement
- Location in Haiti
- Coordinates: 18°32′4″N 74°10′4″W
- Country: Haiti
- Department: Grand'Anse
- Arrondissement: Jérémie
- Elevation: 281 m (922 ft)

Previle is a rural settlement in the Jérémie commune of the Jérémie Arrondissement, in the Grand'Anse department of Haiti.
