= Bonbon, Haiti =

Bonbon
- Commune
- Interactive map of Bonbon
- Location in Haiti
- Coordinates: 18°40′0″N 74°15′0″W
- Country: Haiti
- Department: Grand'Anse
- Arrondissement: Jérémie

Area
  - Total: 31.88 km^{2} (12.31 sq mi)
- Elevation: 113 m (371 ft)

Population (2015)
  - Total: 8,610
  - Density: 270/km^{2} (699/sq mi)
- Time zone: UTC−05:00 (EST)
  - Summer (DST): UTC−04:00 (EDT)
- Postal code: HT 7130

Bonbon (French pronunciation: [bɔ̃bɔ̃]; Haitian Creole: Bonbon) is a commune in the Jérémie Arrondissement, in the Grand'Anse department of Haiti. The non-profit organization Sant Demen is establishing a learning center for the Haitian community in the area. It has 8,610 inhabitants in 2015.

The village of Desarmeaux is also located in the commune.
