= Gros Morne, Haiti =

Gros Morne
- Rural settlement
- Location in Haiti
- Coordinates: 18°31′10″N 74°16′56″W
- Country: Haiti
- Department: Grand'Anse
- Arrondissement: Jérémie
- Elevation: 162 m (531 ft)

Gros Morne is a rural settlement in the Moron commune of the Jérémie Arrondissement, in the Grand'Anse department of Haiti.
