= Carrefour Sanon =

- Rural settlement
- Location in Haiti
- Coordinates: 18°39′3″N 74°12′18″W
- Country: Haiti
- Department: Grand'Anse
- Arrondissement: Jérémie
- Elevation: 261 m (856 ft)

Carrefour Sanon is a rural settlement in the Jérémie commune of the Jérémie Arrondissement, in the Grand'Anse department of Haiti.
