= Feuquières—Fressenneville station =

Former French railway station

Feuquières—Fressenneville
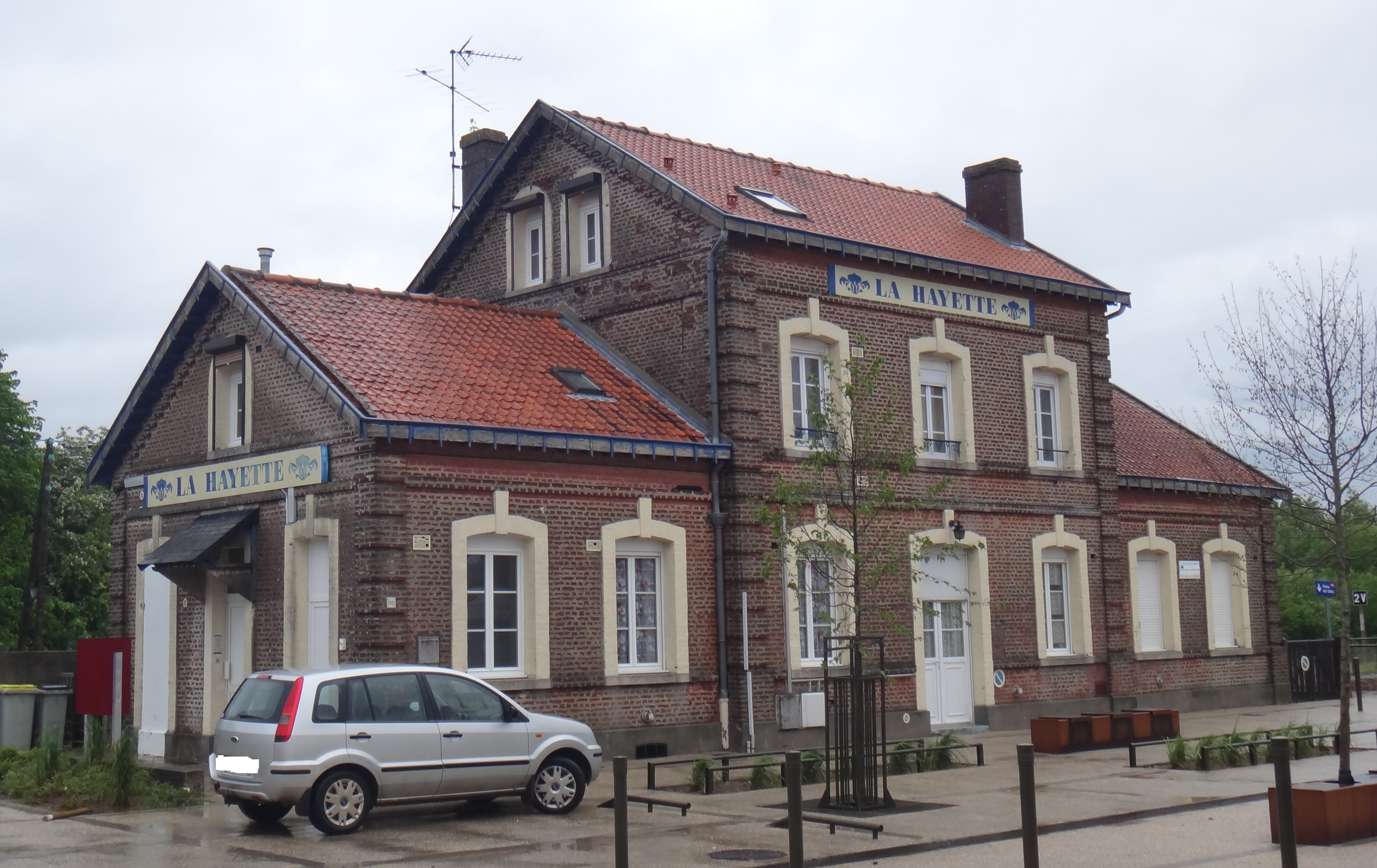
- Feuquières—Fressenneville station building

General information
- Location: Rue Aristide Briand; 80210 Feuquières-en-Vimeu; Somme; France
- Coordinates: 50°3′48″N 1°35′20″E
- Owner: SNCF
- Line: Abbeville—Eu railway
- Platforms: 1
- Tracks: 1

Other information
- Station code: 87317503

History
- Opened: 1882
- Closed: 2018

Passengers
- 2007: 40 per day
Location

Feuquières—Fressenneville station (French: Gare de Feuquières—Fressenneville) is a former railway station located in the commune of Feuquières-en-Vimeu in the Somme department, France, near the village of Fressenneville. The station was served by TER Hauts-de-France trains from Le Tréport-Mers to Abbeville. It was a free-access unstaffed station.

== History ==
The line was placed in service on 4 December 1882. In 2007, an average of 40 passengers a day used the station, an increase of 1.3% over 2002. The station was renovated as part of a programme by the SNCF in 2008. Train services were discontinued in 2018.

== See also ==
- List of SNCF stations in Hauts-de-France
