= Chépy—Valines station =

Former railway station in France

Chépy—Valines
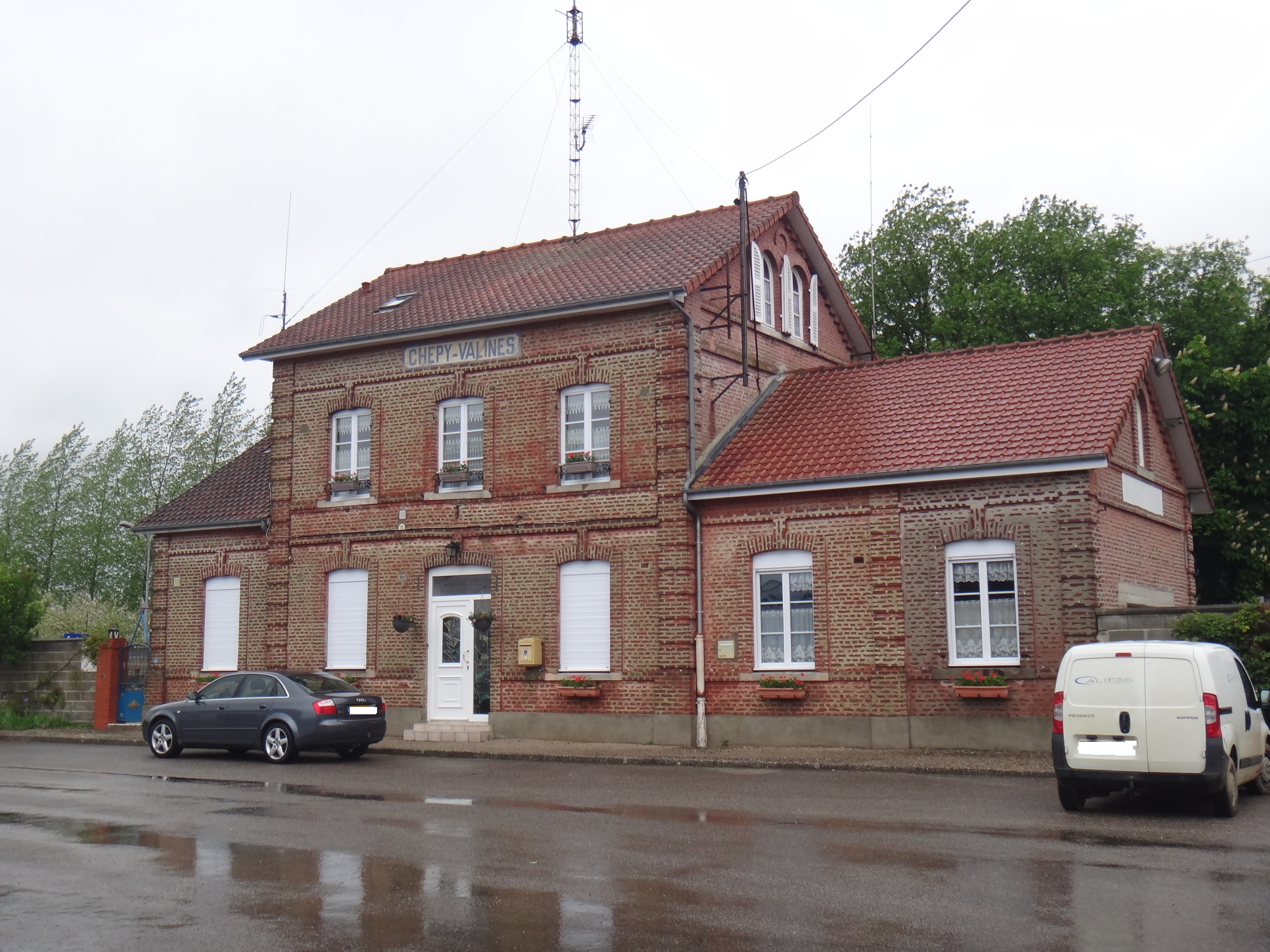
- The station in 2014

General information
- Location: Rue de Valines; 80210 Chépy; Somme; France
- Coordinates: 50°4′5″N 1°38′9″E
- Elevation: 98 m (322 ft)
- Owner: SNCF
- Line: Abbeville—Eu railway

Other information
- Station code: 87317495

History
- Closed: 2018
Location

Chépy—Valines station (French: Gare de Chépy—Valines) is a former railway station located in the commune of Chépy, and near Valines, both in the Somme department, France. The station was served by TER Hauts-de-France trains from Le Tréport-Mers to Abbeville. Train services were discontinued in 2018.

== See also ==
- List of SNCF stations in Hauts-de-France
