= Abricots =

Abricots: Abriko
- Commune
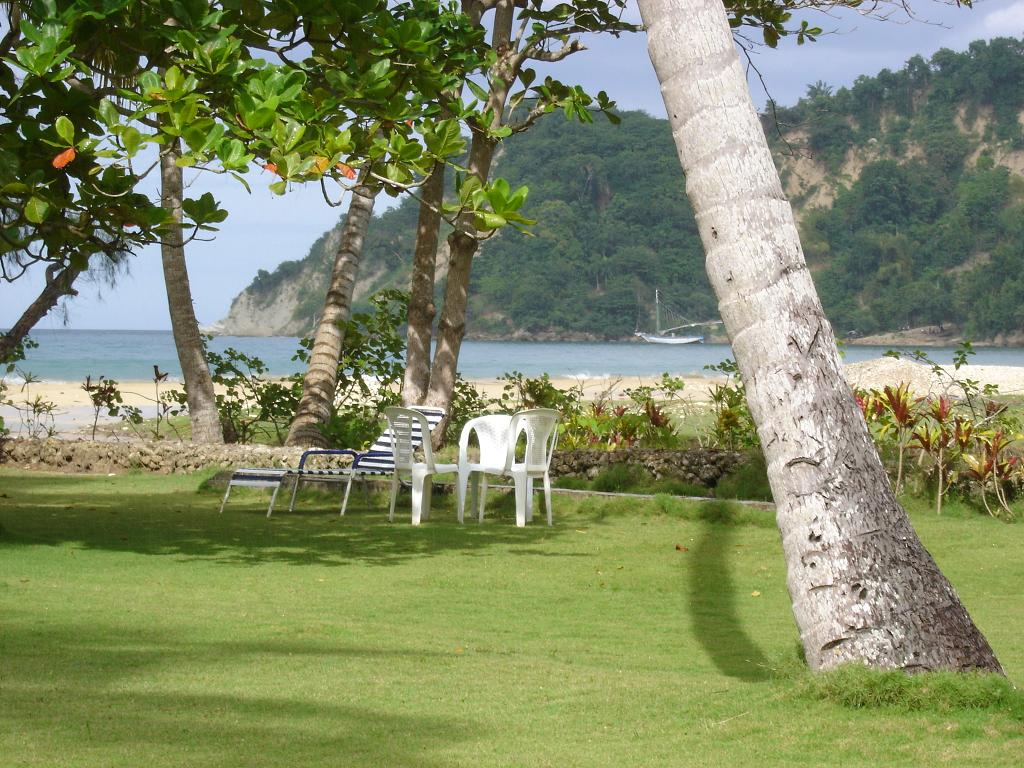
- Anse du Clerc
- Interactive map of Abricots
- Location in Haiti
- Coordinates: 18°38′0″N 74°18′0″W
- Country: Haiti
- Department: Grand'Anse
- Arrondissement: Jérémie

Area
  - Total: 102.89 km^{2} (39.73 sq mi)
- Elevation: 220 m (720 ft)

Population (2015)
  - Total: 37,675
  - Density: 366.17/km^{2} (948.37/sq mi)
- Time zone: UTC−05:00 (EST)
  - Summer (DST): UTC−04:00 (EDT)
- Postal code: HT 7120

Abricots (French pronunciation: [abʁiko], lit. 'Apricots'; Haitian Creole: Abriko) is a commune in the Jérémie Arrondissement, in the Grand'Anse department of Haiti. Its Taino-name was Mamey which means apricot the fruit. The town is nicknamed le Paradis des Indiens (Indians' Paradise).

Villages located within the municipality include: Abricots, Anse du Clerc, Anse Josep, L'Homond, Latitte, Louissant, Morne Bijote, Poyrette, Sajote, and Saint-Victor
