= Laforêt (disambiguation) =

Laforêt is a village in Wallonia, Belgium.

Laforêt or Laforet may also refer to:

- Laforet, a department store in Shibuya, Tokyo

== People ==
- Carmen Laforet (1921–2004), Spanish existentialist and novelist
- Marie Laforêt (1939–2019), French singer and actress
- Nicholas-Joseph Laforêt (1823–1872), Belgian theologian
- Vincent Laforet (born 1975), Swiss–American photographer and director

== See also ==
- La Forêt (disambiguation)
