= Diocese of Jérémie =

Roman Catholic diocese in Haiti

Coordinates: 18.6447°N 74.1146°W

Diocese of Jérémie Dioecesis Ieremiopolitana Diocèse de Jérémie Dyosèz Jeremi
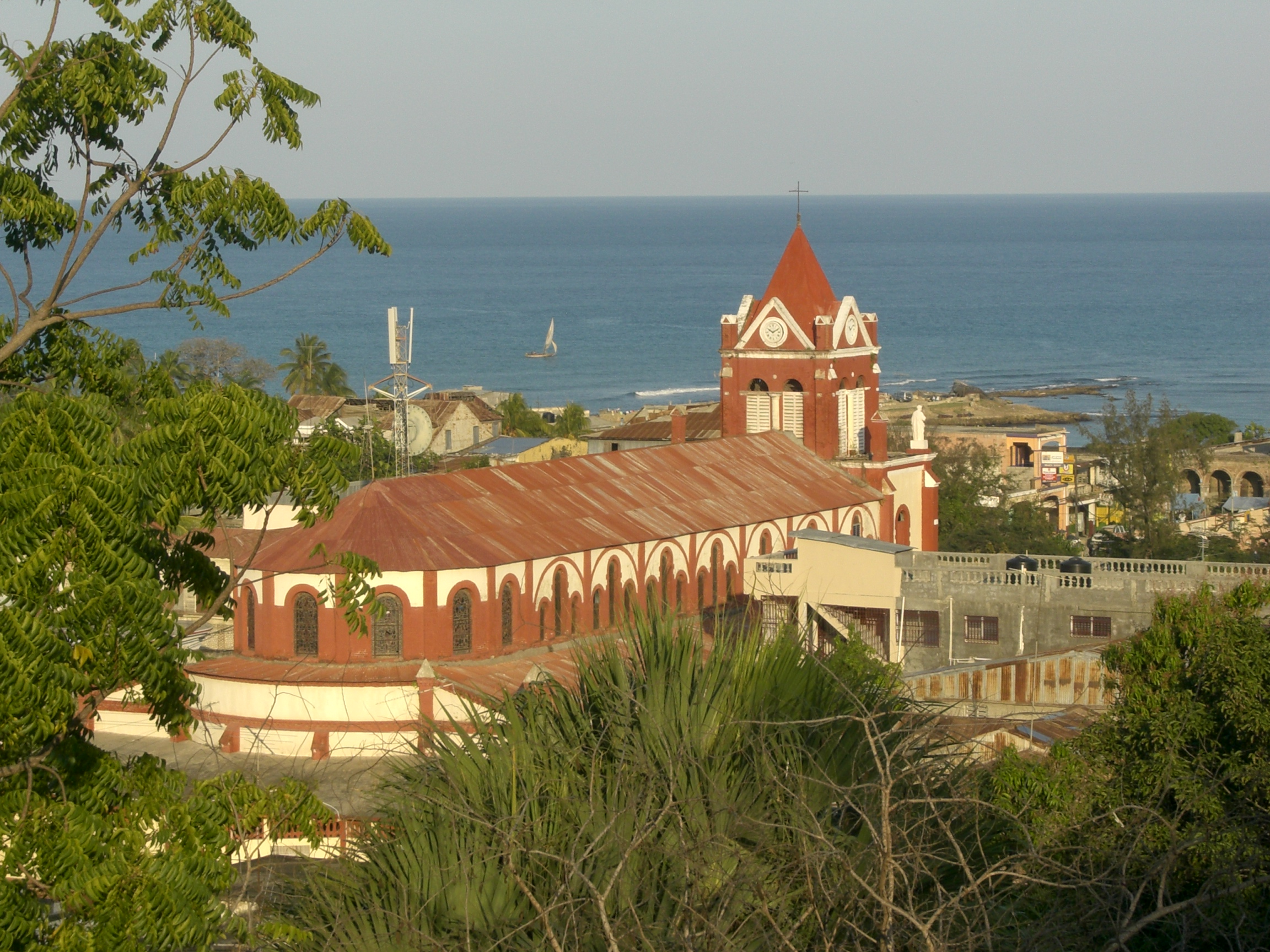
- Cathédrale St. Louis Roi de France

Location
- Country: Haiti
- Ecclesiastical province: Province of Port-au-Prince
- Metropolitan: Jérémie

Statistics
- Area: 2,146 km^{2} (829 sq mi)
- Population: Total; Catholics: (as of 2006); 652,950; 450,645 (69%)
- Parishes: 34

Information
- Denomination: Roman Catholic
- Rite: Latin Rite
- Established: 20 April 1972 (54 years ago)
- Cathedral: Cathedral of St. Louis Roi de France

Current leadership
- Pope: Leo XIV
- Bishop: Joseph Gontrand Decoste, SJ

The Diocese of Jérémie (Latin: Dioecesis Ieremiopolitana; French: Diocèse de Jérémie; Haitian Creole: Dyosèz Jeremi), erected 20 April 1972, is a suffragan of the Archdiocese of Port-au-Prince.

== Bishops ==
=== Ordinaries ===
- Charles-Edouard Peters, S.M.M. (1972 - 1975)
- Joseph Willy Romélus (1977 - 2009)
- Joseph Gontrand Decoste, SJ (2009–present)

=== Another priest of this diocese who became bishop ===
- Joseph Serge Miot, appointed Coadjutor Archbishop of Port-au-Prince in 1997

== External links and references ==
- Media related to Roman Catholic Diocese of Jérémie at Wikimedia Commons
- "Diocese of Jérémie". Catholic-Hierarchy.
- GCatholic.org page for the Diocese of Jeremie
