= Campagne station =

Railway station in Campagne-sur-Aude, France

Coordinates: 42°55′01″N 2°12′19″E

Campagne is a railway station in Campagne-sur-Aude, Occitanie, France. The station is on the Carcassonne – Rivesaltes line. The station is served by TER Occitanie bus services to Limoux and Quillan. Train services between Limoux and Quillan were suspended in 2018, and are expected to be resumed in 2025.

== See also ==
- Campagna station (disambiguation)
- Campanhã station (disambiguation)
