= Moron, Haiti =

Moron Mowon
- Commune
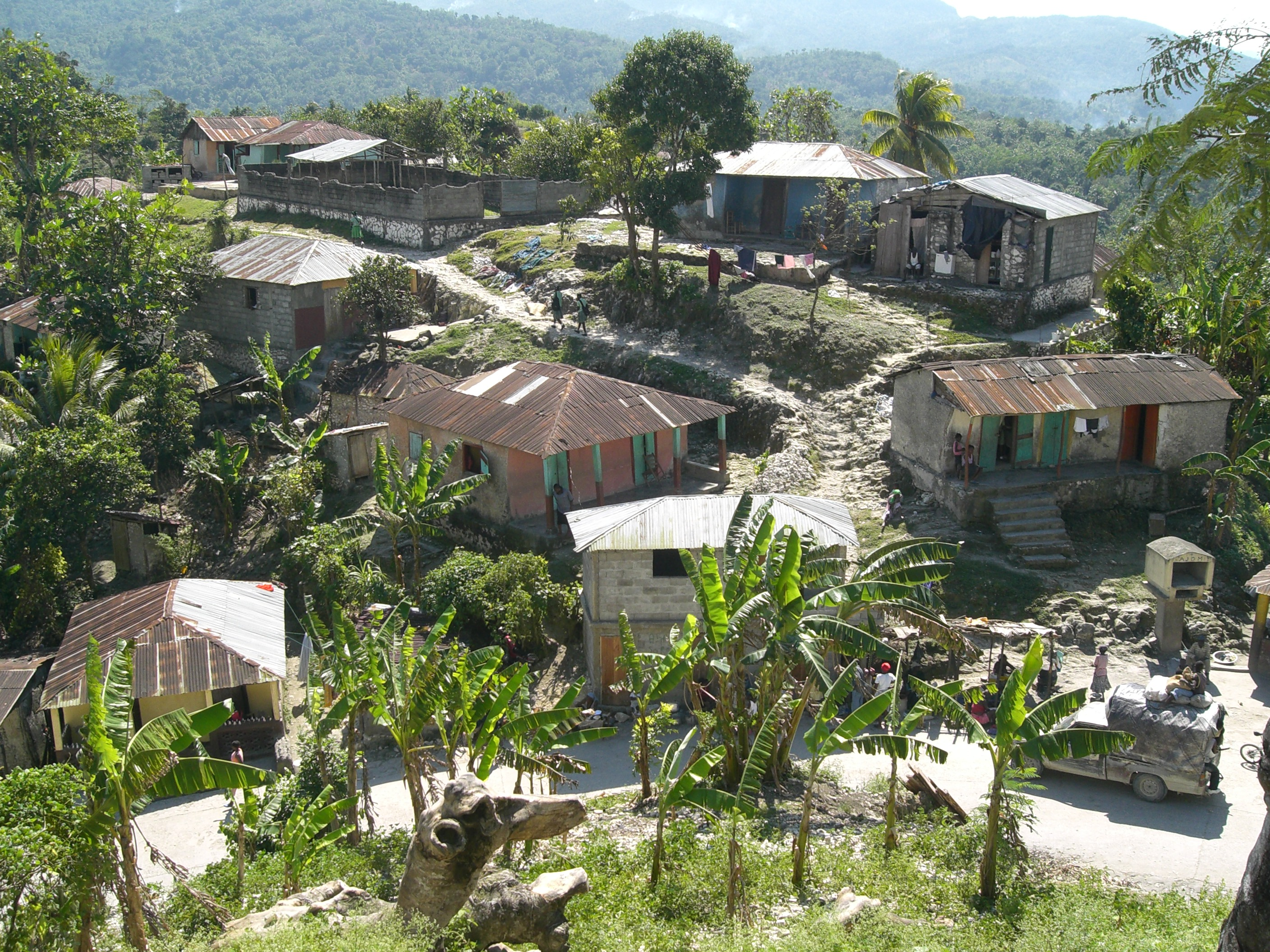
- Interactive map of Moron
- Location in Haiti
- Coordinates: 18°33′36.0828″N 74°15′28.3068″W
- Country: Haiti
- Department: Grand'Anse
- Arrondissement: Jérémie

Area
  - Total: 182.9 km^{2} (70.6 sq mi)
- Elevation: 97 m (318 ft)

Population (2015)
  - Total: 31,157
  - Density: 170.3/km^{2} (441.2/sq mi)
- Time zone: UTC−05:00 (EST)
  - Summer (DST): UTC−04:00 (EDT)
- Postal code: HT 7140

Moron (French pronunciation: [mɔʁɔ̃]; Haitian Creole: Mowon) is a commune in the Jérémie Arrondissement, in the Grand'Anse department of Haiti. It has 31,157 inhabitants (in 2015).

Villages located within the commune include: Moron, Gros Morne, La Roche, Layalace, Lenaire, Plik and Sources Chaudes.
