= Adoption law =

Law relating to adoption

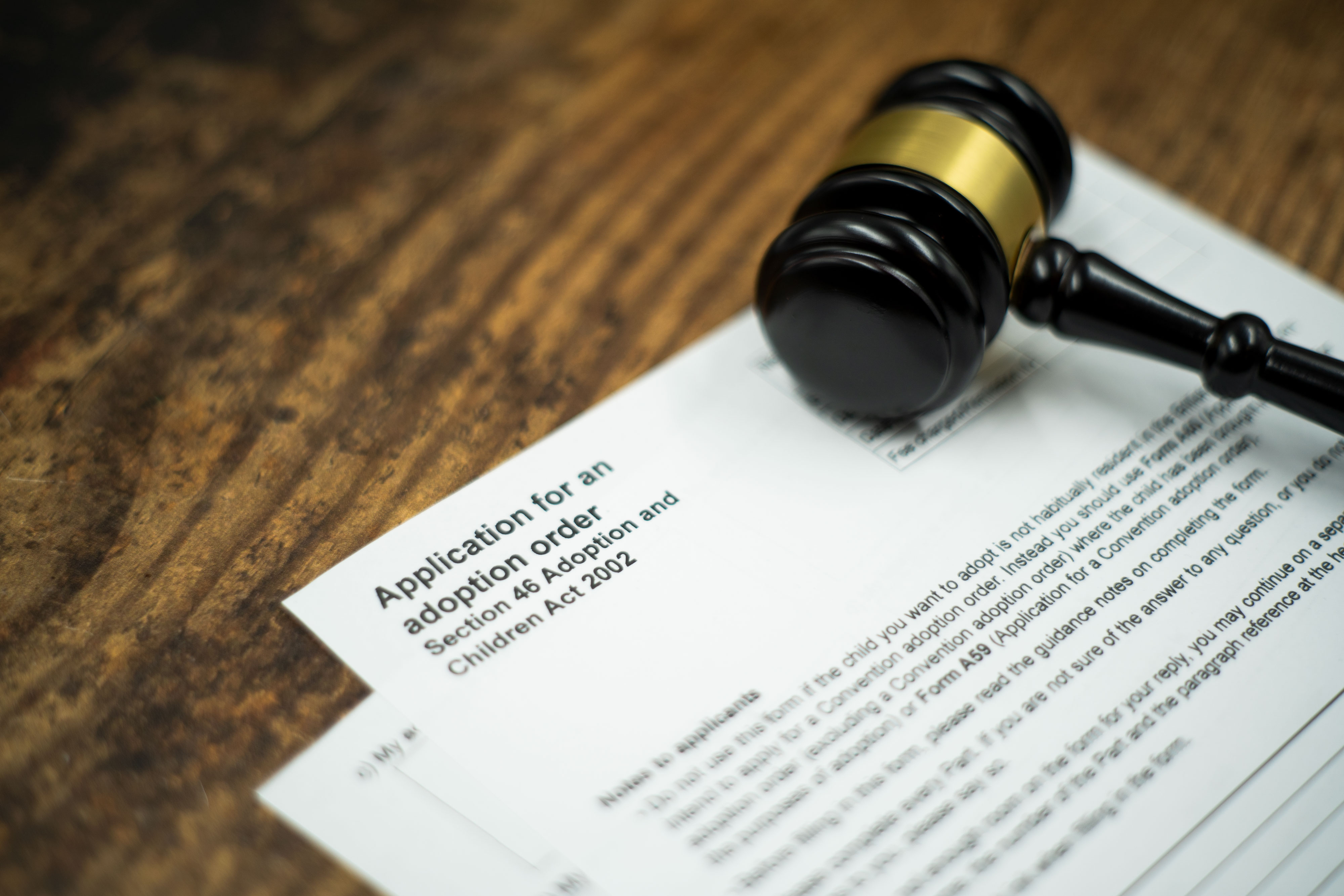
Adoption application forms.

Adoption law is the generic area of legal theory, policy making, legal practice and legal studies relating to law on adoption.

== National adoption laws ==
National, or domestic, adoption laws deal with issues such as step-parent adoption, adoption by cohabitees, adoption by single parents and LGBT adoption. Adoption laws in some countries may be affected by religious considerations such as adoption in Islam.

=== Specific laws ===
Laws vary widely from country to country and in the likes of United States, from state to state.

== Intercountry adoption laws ==
Intercountry adoption laws vary widely.
