= Jérémie =

Jérémie Jeremi
- Commune
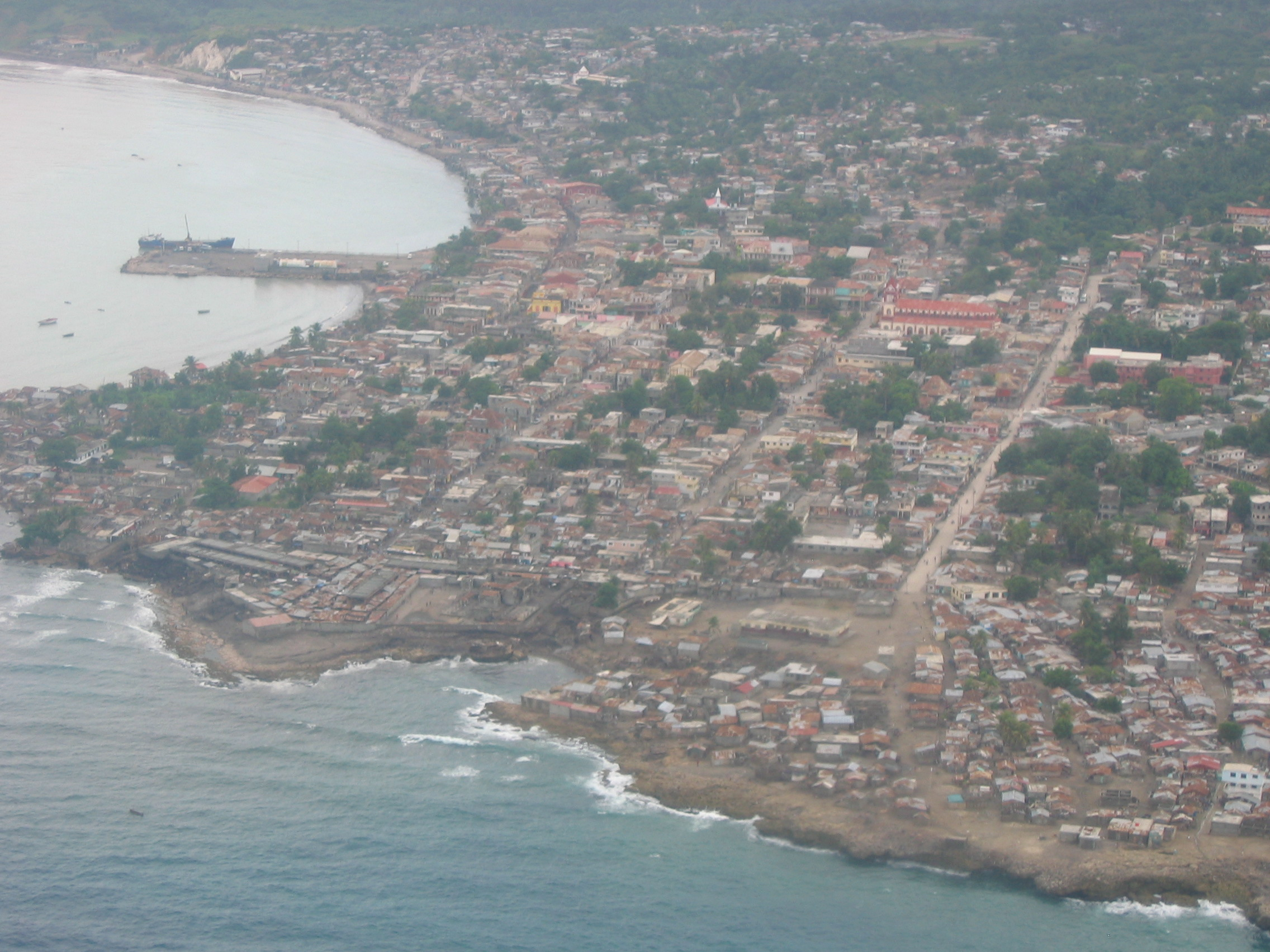
- Jérémie (2007)
- Nickname: La Cité des Poètes; The City of Poets
- Interactive map of Jérémie
- Location in Haiti
- Coordinates: 18°39′0″N 74°7′0″W
- Country: Haiti
- Department: Grand'Anse
- Arrondissement: Jérémie
- Founded: 1756

Government
  - Mayor: Ronald Étienne

Area
  - Total: 164.95 sq mi (427.22 km^{2})

Population (2015)
  - Total: 134,317
  - Density: 814.29/sq mi (314.40/km^{2})
- Time zone: UTC−05:00 (EST)
  - Summer (DST): UTC−04:00 (EDT)
- Postal code: HT 7110

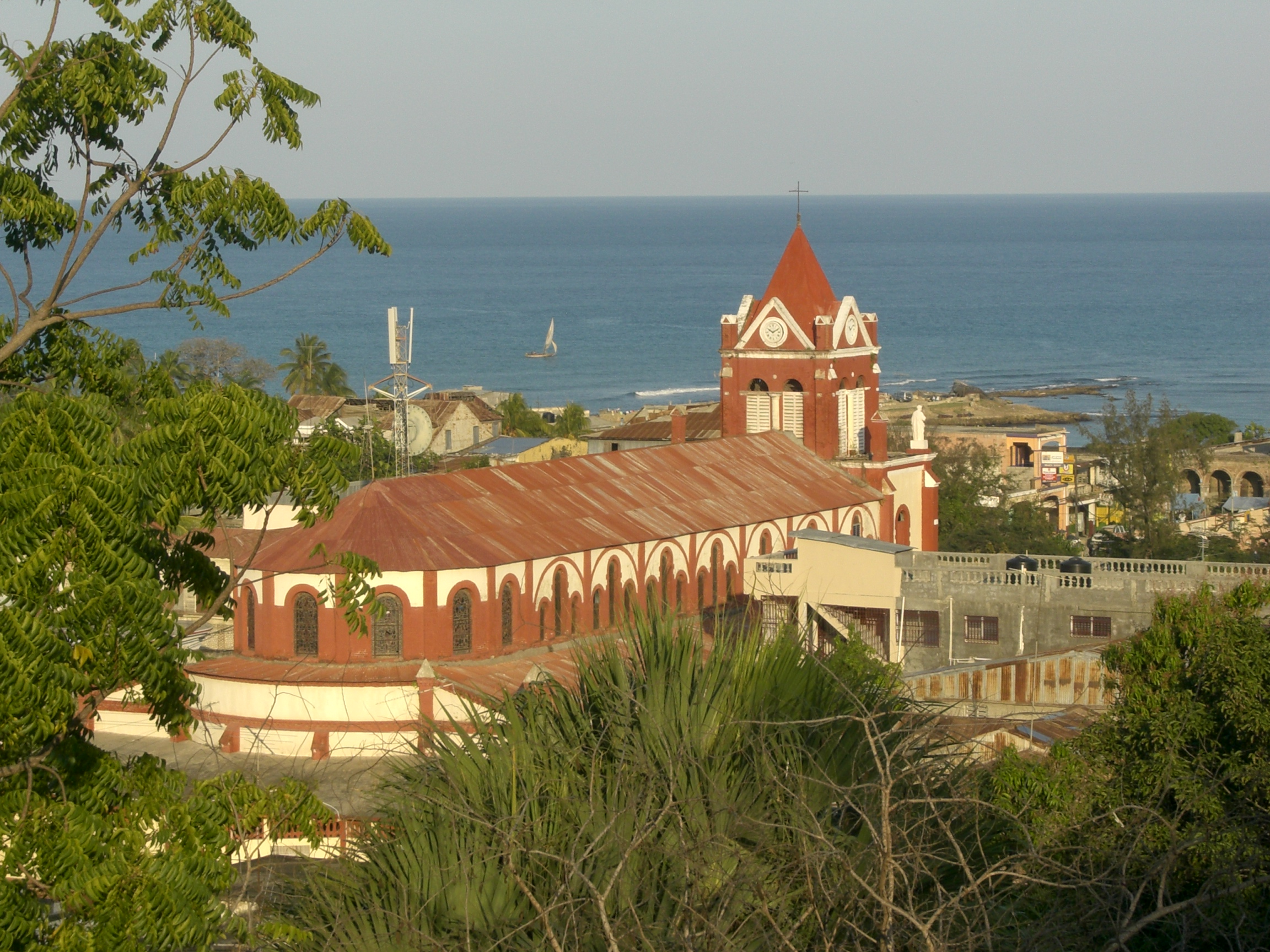
St. Louis King of France Cathedral (2006)

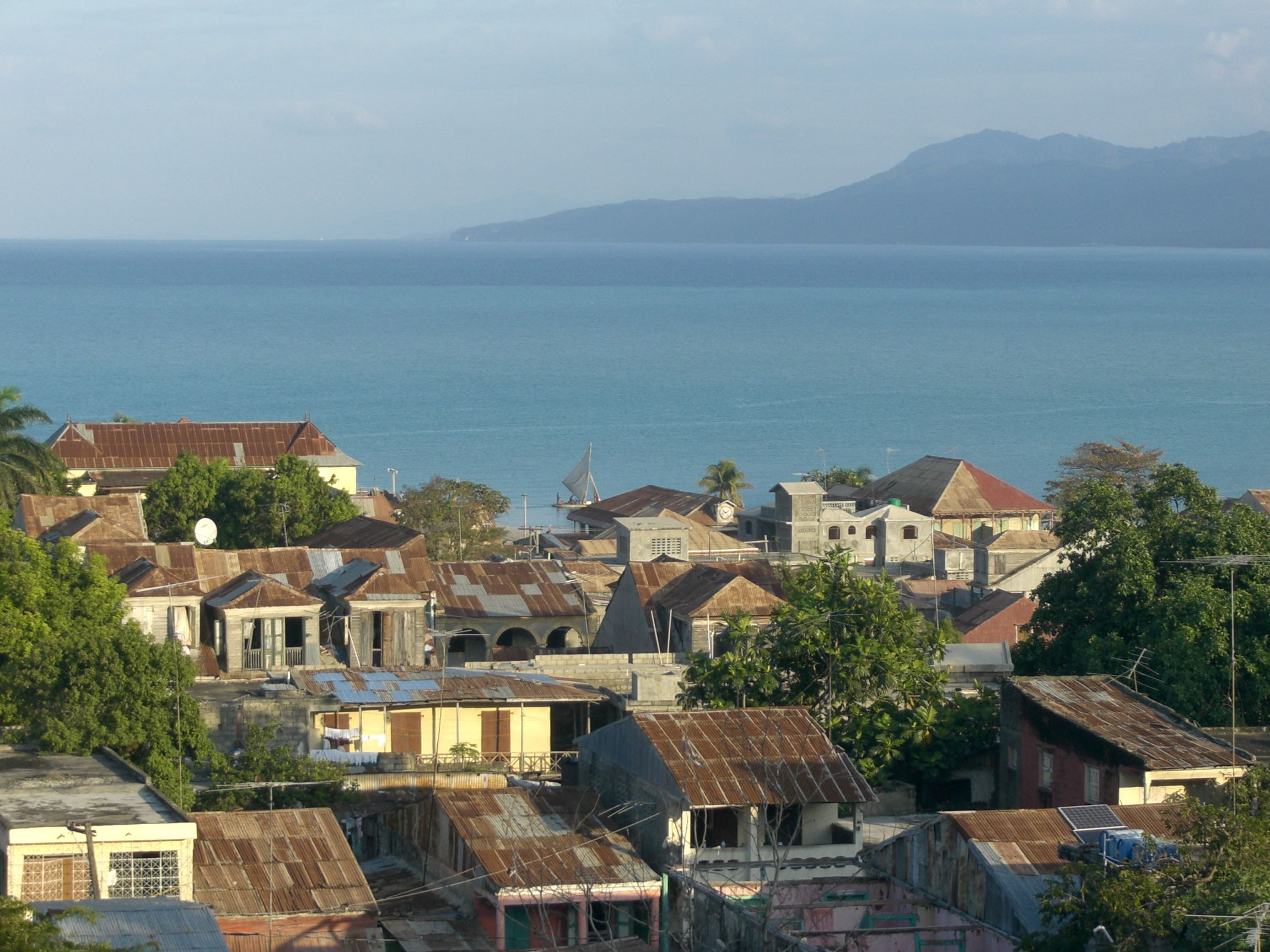
Centre of Jérémie (2006)

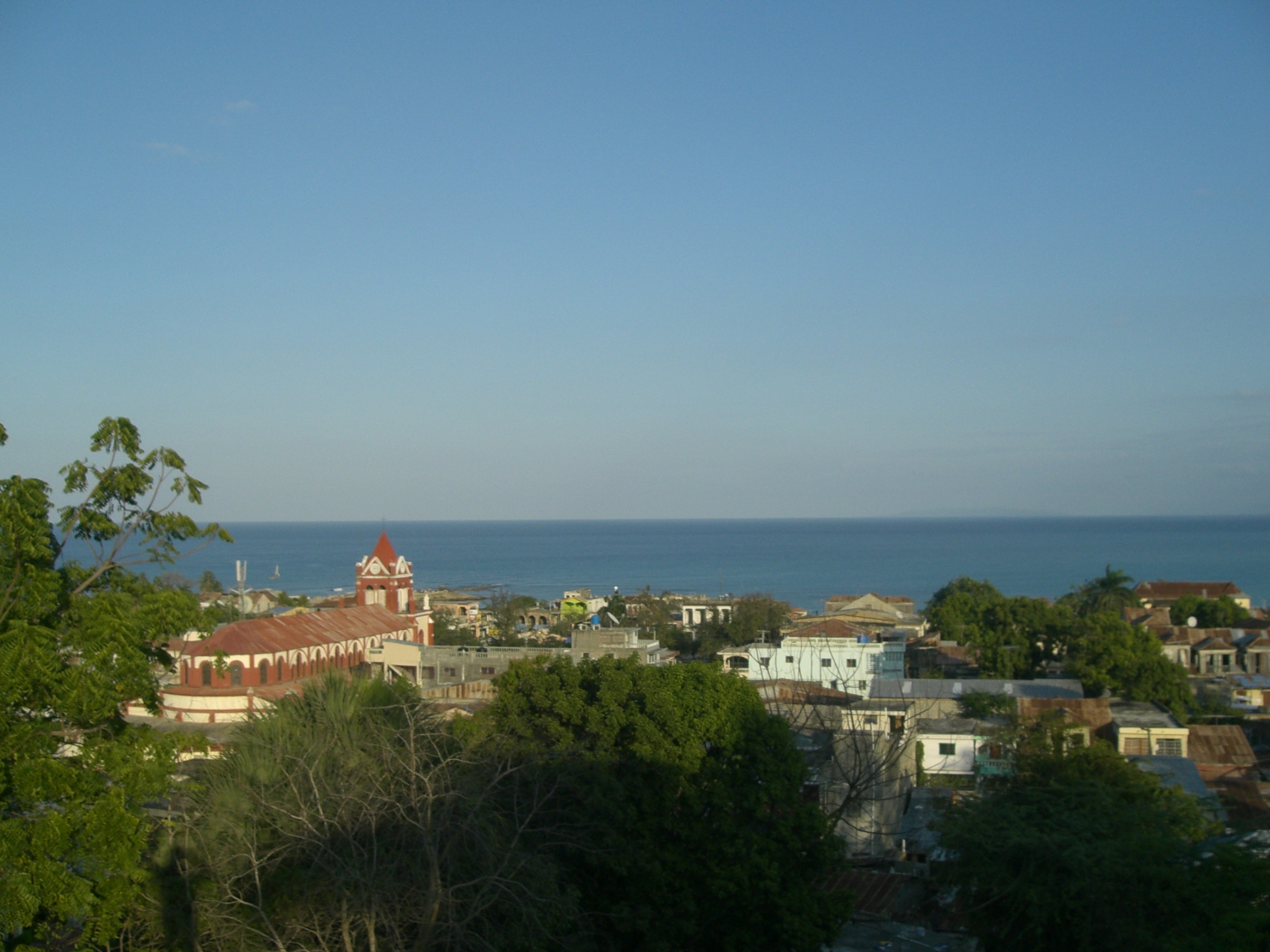
Jérémie (2007)

Jérémie (French pronunciation: [ʒeʁemi]; Haitian Creole: Jeremi) is a commune and capital city of the Grand'Anse department in Haiti. It had a population of about 134,317 at the 2015 census. It is relatively isolated from the rest of the country. The Grande-Anse River flows near the city.

Jérémie is called the city of the poets because of the numerous writers, poets, and historians born there.

== History ==
During 1762, Creole General Thomas-Alexandre Dumas was born here. He is mostly known for fighting under Napoleon in Italy and Egypt and for being the father of writer Alexandre Dumas.

In 1954, Jérémie was hit by Hurricane Hazel, which destroyed much of the city and destroyed many neighboring inland villages. Hazel travelled north along the continental east coast and went on to kill 95 people in the United States and 81 people in Canada.

In 1964, during the Jérémie Vespers, the Haitian army and the Tonton Macoutes massacred 27 people in Jérémie.

In the early 2000s, archaeologists uncovered an ancient synagogue of Crypto-Jews in the city, the only one found on the island. Jérémie has historically been inhabited by many mixed-race families of Jewish descent.

In the aftermath of the 2010 earthquake, a food aid convoy transporting aid delivered to Jérémie Airport through Jérémie encountered a hijacking attempt by 20 men, on 30 January 2010. Medical supplies have also been airlifted through the airport, due to the increase in medical needs from injured refugees arriving in the wake of the quake.

In October 2016, Jérémie was almost completely destroyed by Hurricane Matthew as it went past Haiti.

Roughly 40 nautical miles (46 mi; 74 km) west of the city lies Navassa Island, which is claimed by Haiti and the United States.

== Facilities ==
The city has an airport, Jérémie Airport. The area of the airport of Jérémie is known as "Numero Deux". Mission Aviation Fellowship conducts charter flights into the airport. Agape Flights, based in Venice, Florida, provides weekly mail and cargo service for several missionaries in the area.

== Locations in Jérémie ==
Beaudrouin, Campagne, Carrefour Sanon, Dayere, Duranton, La Forêt, Leopold, Lori, Marche Leon, Previle, Rampe des Lions and Sassier.

== Notable natives and residents ==
- Thomas-Alexandre Dumas, a general of the French Revolutionary Wars, was born in Jérémie as the son of a French nobleman and his African slave, before independence. Dumas lived most of his life in France, where his father took him at age 18. He married and was the father of Alexandre Dumas, who became a noted and prolific author in the nineteenth century.
- Joseph Serge Miot, was born there. He was the Archbishop of Port-au-Prince, and was killed in the 2010 Haiti earthquake.
- Emile Roumer (1903–1988), a poet.
- Modeste Testas (1765–1870), formerly enslaved Ethiopian woman, whose statues stands in Bordeaux commemorating the transatlantic slave trade.
- Etzer Vilaire (1872–1951), a poet
- Elisabeth Dieudonné Vincent (1798–1883) free colored businesswoman
- Joseph Raoul Cédras (1949) former Haitian military officer.
