= Roosevelt Sanon =

Haitian artist

Roosevelt Sanon is a Haitian artist who was born in 1951 in Jacmel to Bejamine Jean-Pierre Sanon and Clément Sanon. He began painting at age 17 with no instruction. He later received mentoring from Raphaël Surin and others. His siblings Lamar and Jeannet Sanon are also painters. When he was 23, Sanon was the grand prizewinner in an art competition sponsored by the German embassy in Haiti and the Musée d’Art Haïtien. Afterwards, he traveled to Germany to study the work of European artists. From 1979 to 1985, Sanon has exhibited his work in France, Switzerland, England and Haiti between 1979 and 1985. Some of his work is displayed in the Haitian embassy in Washington, DC.

His better known pieces include: A river runs through it, Mapou tree and The walking tree.
