= Feuquières-en-Vimeu =

- Commune
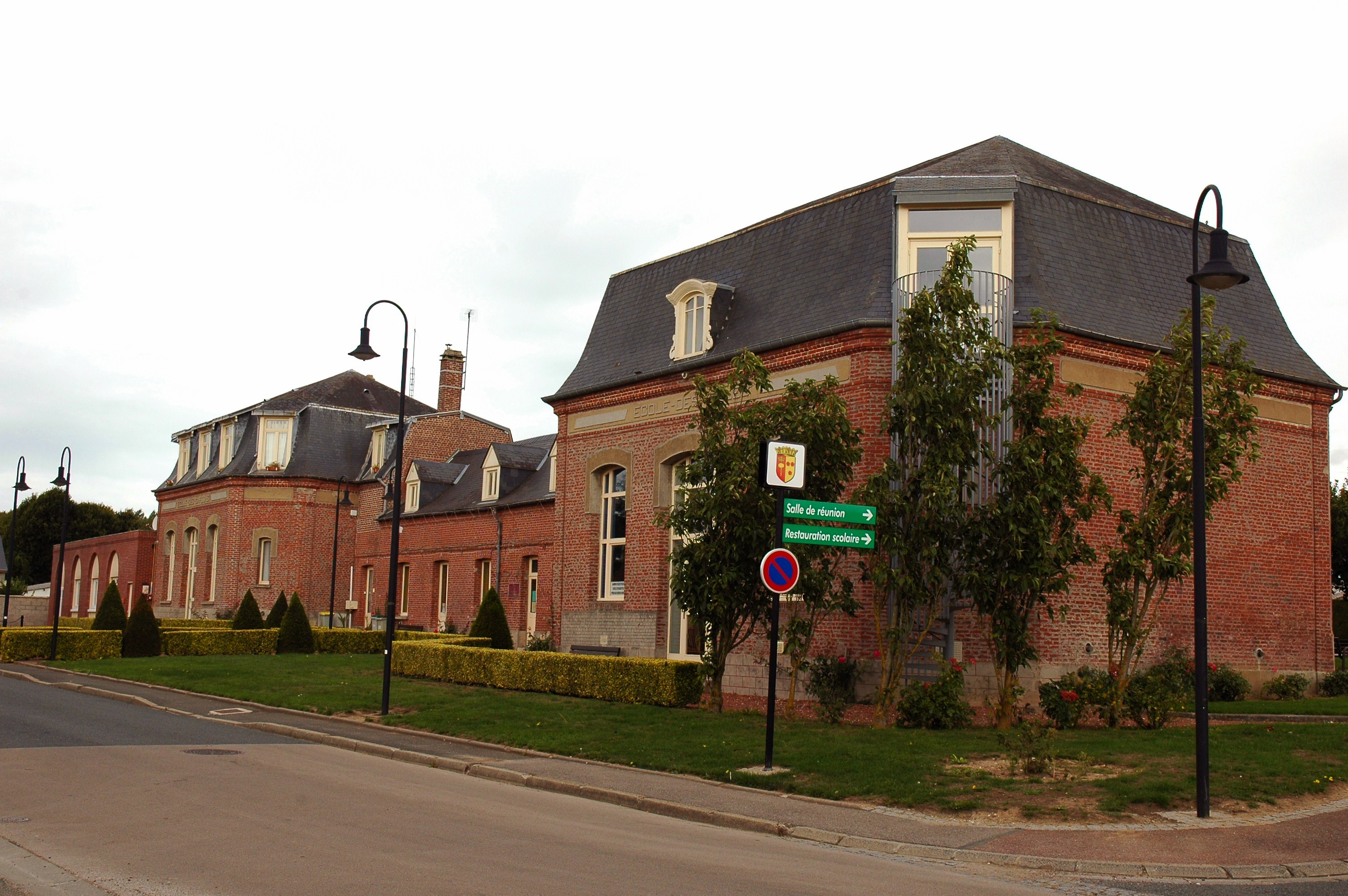
- The school in Feuquières-en-Vimeu

- Coat of arms
- Location of Feuquières-en-Vimeu
- Location within France Location within Hauts-de-France
- Coordinates: 50°03′43″N 1°36′21″E
- Country: France
- Region: Hauts-de-France
- Department: Somme
- Arrondissement: Abbeville
- Canton: Gamaches
- Intercommunality: CC Vimeu

Government
  - Mayor (2021–2026): Maryline Heckmann
- Area^{1}: 7.99 km^{2} (3.08 sq mi)
- Elevation: 100 m (330 ft)
- Highest elevation: 121 m (397 ft)
- Lowest elevation: 88 m (289 ft)
- Population (2023): 2,414
  - Density: 302/km^{2} (783/sq mi)
- Time zone: UTC+01:00 (CET)
  - Summer (DST): UTC+02:00 (CEST)
- INSEE/Postal code: 80308 /80210
- ^{1} French Land Register data, which excludes lakes, ponds, glaciers > 1 km^{2} (0.386 sq mi or 247 acres) and river estuaries.

Feuquières-en-Vimeu (French pronunciation: [føkjɛʁ ɑ̃ vimø], literally Feuquières in Vimeu; Picard: Feutchére-in-Vimeu) is a commune in the Somme department in Hauts-de-France in northern France.

== Geography ==
The commune is situated on the D229 and D48 junction, some 12 miles (19 km) southwest of Abbeville.

== Population ==
Historical population

| Year | Pop. | ±% p.a. |
|---|---|---|
| 1806 | 1,232 | — |
| 1856 | 1,520 | +0.42% |
| 1906 | 1,862 | +0.41% |
| 1921 | 1,952 | +0.32% |
| 1936 | 1,983 | +0.11% |
| 1962 | 2,082 | +0.19% |
| 1968 | 2,249 | +1.29% |
| 1975 | 2,617 | +2.19% |

| Year | Pop. | ±% p.a. |
|---|---|---|
| 1982 | 2,499 | −0.66% |
| 1990 | 2,428 | −0.36% |
| 1999 | 2,370 | −0.27% |
| 2007 | 2,483 | +0.58% |
| 2012 | 2,496 | +0.10% |
| 2017 | 2,570 | +0.59% |
| 2023 | 2,414 | −1.04% |

Source: EHESS and INSEE (1968-2023)

== See also ==
- Communes of the Somme department
