= Quesnoy-le-Montant =

- Commune
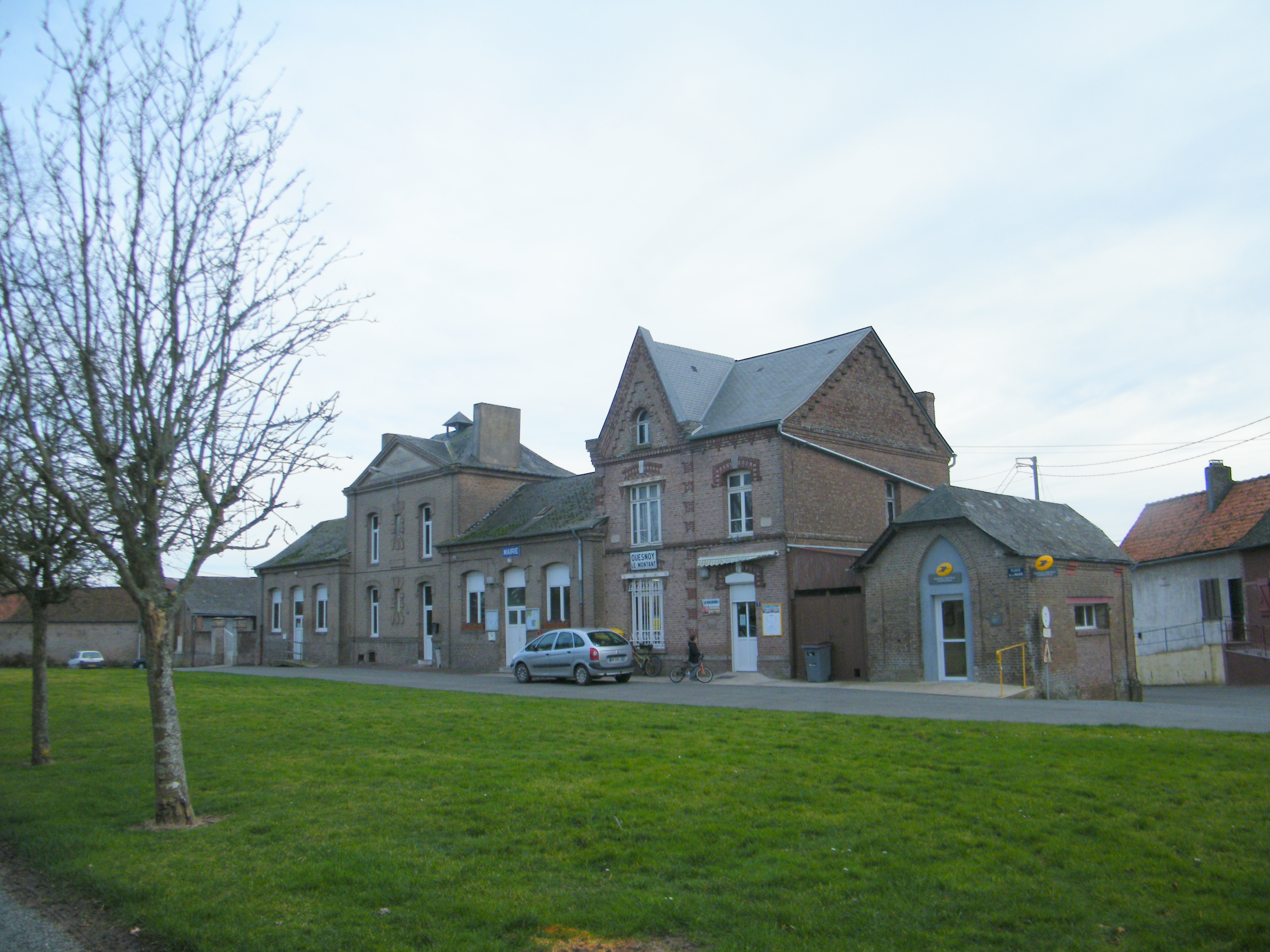
- The town hall and school in Quesnoy
- Location of Quesnoy-le-Montant
- Location within France Location within Hauts-de-France
- Coordinates: 50°06′35″N 1°41′18″E
- Country: France
- Region: Hauts-de-France
- Department: Somme
- Arrondissement: Abbeville
- Canton: Abbeville-2
- Intercommunality: CC Vimeu

Government
  - Mayor (2022–2026): Josette Cayeux
- Area^{1}: 7.04 km^{2} (2.72 sq mi)
- Elevation: 21 m (69 ft)
- Highest elevation: 79 m (259 ft)
- Lowest elevation: 13 m (43 ft)
- Population (2023): 514
  - Density: 73.0/km^{2} (189/sq mi)
- Time zone: UTC+01:00 (CET)
  - Summer (DST): UTC+02:00 (CEST)
- INSEE/Postal code: 80654 /80132
- ^{1} French Land Register data, which excludes lakes, ponds, glaciers > 1 km^{2} (0.386 sq mi or 247 acres) and river estuaries.

Quesnoy-le-Montant (French pronunciation: [kenwa lə mɔ̃tɑ̃]) is a commune in the Somme department in Hauts-de-France in northern France.

== Geography ==
The commune is situated on the D65 and D108 roads, some 7 miles (11 km) west of Abbeville.

== Population ==
Historical population
Year	Pop.	±% p.a.
1968	556	—
1975	519	−0.98%
1982	502	−0.47%
1990	511	+0.22%
1999	519	+0.17%
2007	566	+1.09%
2012	584	+0.63%
2017	564	−0.69%
2023	514	−1.54%
Source: INSEE

== See also ==
- Communes of the Somme department
