= Chépy =

- Commune
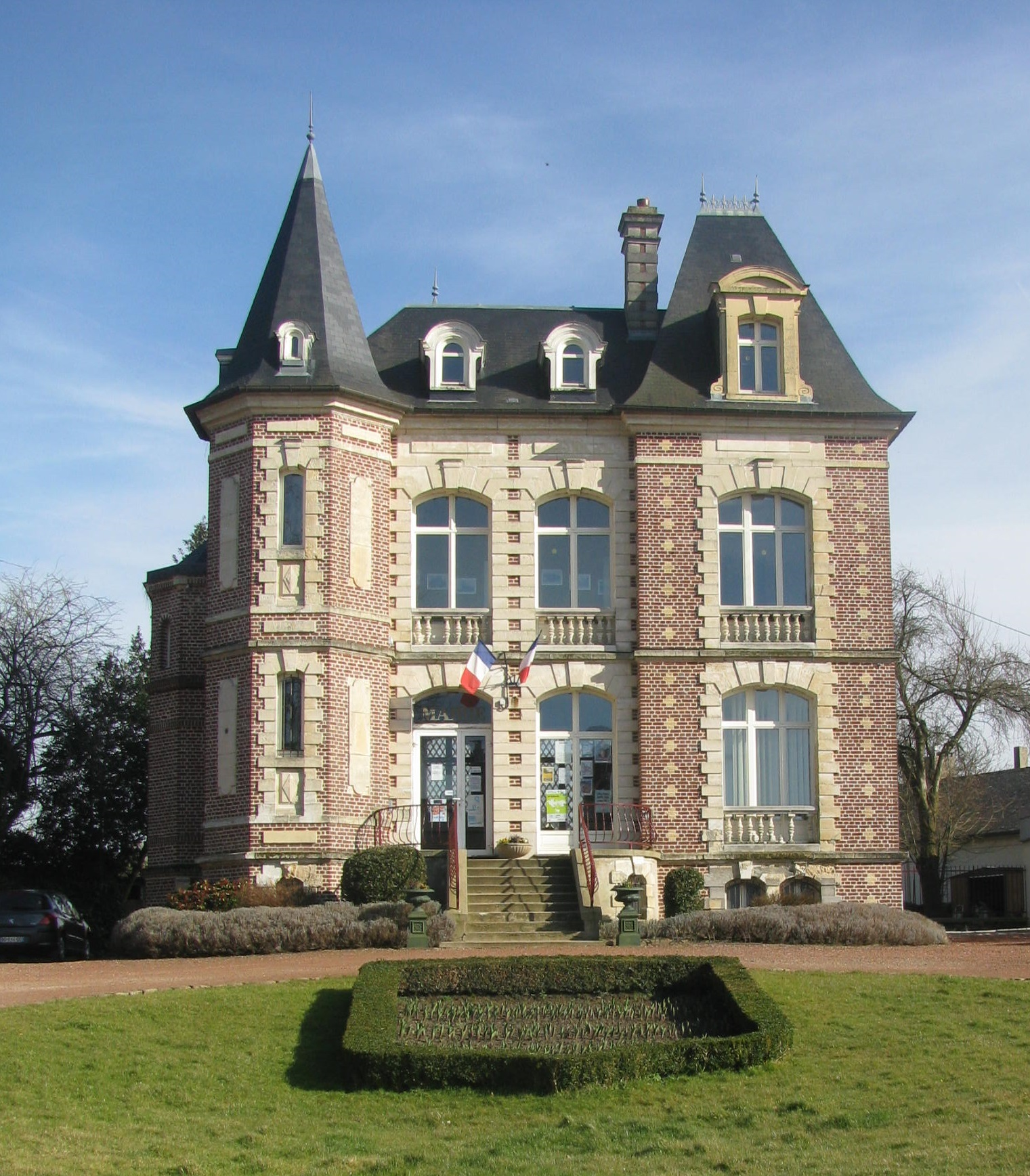
- The town hall in Chépy

- Coat of arms
- Location of Chépy
- Location within France Location within Hauts-de-France
- Coordinates: 50°03′46″N 1°38′51″E
- Country: France
- Region: Hauts-de-France
- Department: Somme
- Arrondissement: Abbeville
- Canton: Gamaches
- Intercommunality: CC Vimeu

Government
  - Mayor (2020–2026): Denis Vandenbulcke
- Area^{1}: 7.35 km^{2} (2.84 sq mi)
- Elevation: 96 m (315 ft)
- Highest elevation: 111 m (364 ft)
- Lowest elevation: 57 m (187 ft)
- Population (2023): 1,190
  - Density: 162/km^{2} (419/sq mi)
- Time zone: UTC+01:00 (CET)
  - Summer (DST): UTC+02:00 (CEST)
- INSEE/Postal code: 80190 /80210
- ^{1} French Land Register data, which excludes lakes, ponds, glaciers > 1 km^{2} (0.386 sq mi or 247 acres) and river estuaries.

Chépy (French pronunciation: [ʃepi]; Picard: Chpy) is a commune in the Somme department in Hauts-de-France in northern France.

== Geography ==
The commune is situated on the D465 and D65 crossroads, some 15 km (9 mi) southwest of Abbeville.

== Population ==
Historical population
Year	Pop.	±% p.a.
1968	860	—
1975	1,083	+3.35%
1982	1,227	+1.80%
1990	1,246	+0.19%
1999	1,277	+0.27%
2007	1,293	+0.16%
2012	1,288	−0.08%
2017	1,252	−0.57%
2023	1,190	−0.84%
Source: INSEE

== Controversy ==
The official spelling of the name of the commune is "Chépy" as specified by the Official Geographical Code of the French Republic. Some inhabitants in this commune believe the spelling "Chépy" is wrong and should be replaced by "Chepy" and pronounced thus.

== See also ==
- Communes of the Somme department
- Réseau des Bains de Mer
