= Jérémie Arrondissement =

Coordinates: 18.641274°N 74.117897°W

Jérémie Arrondissement Arrondissement de Jérémie Awondisman Jeremi
- Arrondissement
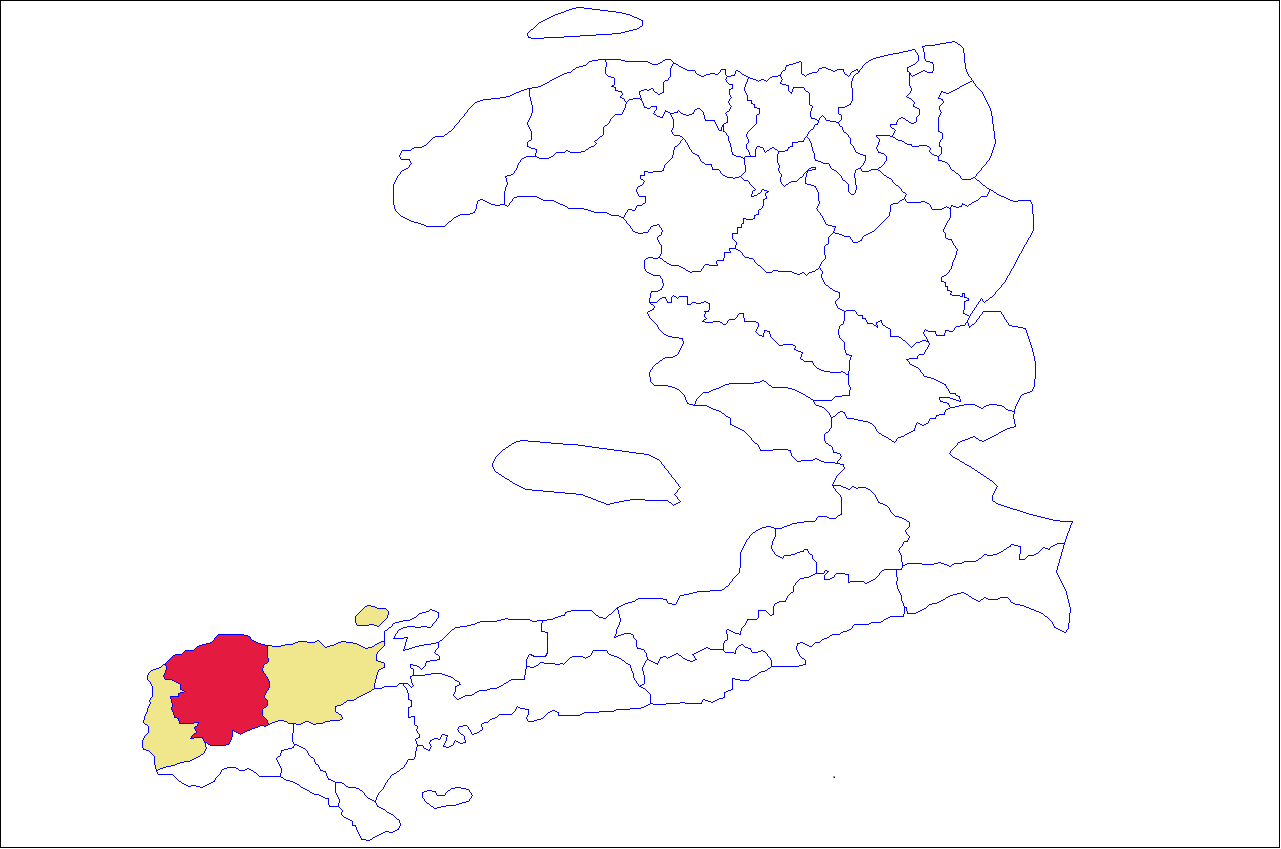
- Interactive map of Jérémie Arrondissement
- Country: Haiti
- Department: Grand'Anse

Area
  - Arrondissement: 818.02 km^{2} (315.84 sq mi)
  - Urban: 7.00 km^{2} (2.70 sq mi)
  - Rural: 811.02 km^{2} (313.14 sq mi)

Population (2015)
  - Arrondissement: 238,218
  - Density: 291.21/km^{2} (754.24/sq mi)
  - Urban: 58,221
  - Rural: 179,997
- Time zone: UTC-5 (Eastern)
- Postal code: HT71—
- Communes: 6
- Communal Sections: 19
- IHSI Code: 081

Jérémie (Haitian Creole: Jeremi) is an arrondissement in the Grand'Anse Department of Haiti. As of 2015, the population was 238,218 inhabitants. Postal codes in the Anse d'Hainault Arrondissement start with the number 71.

== Communes ==
The arrondissement consists of the following communes:

- Jérémie
- Abricots
- Bonbon
- Chambellan
- Moron
- Marfranc

== History ==
In the aftermath of the 2010 Haiti earthquake, a food aide convoy transporting aide delivered to Jérémie Airport through Jérémie, encountered a hijacking attempt by 20 men, on Saturday 30 January 2010.

== See also ==
- Arrondissements of Haiti
