= Demographics of Haiti =

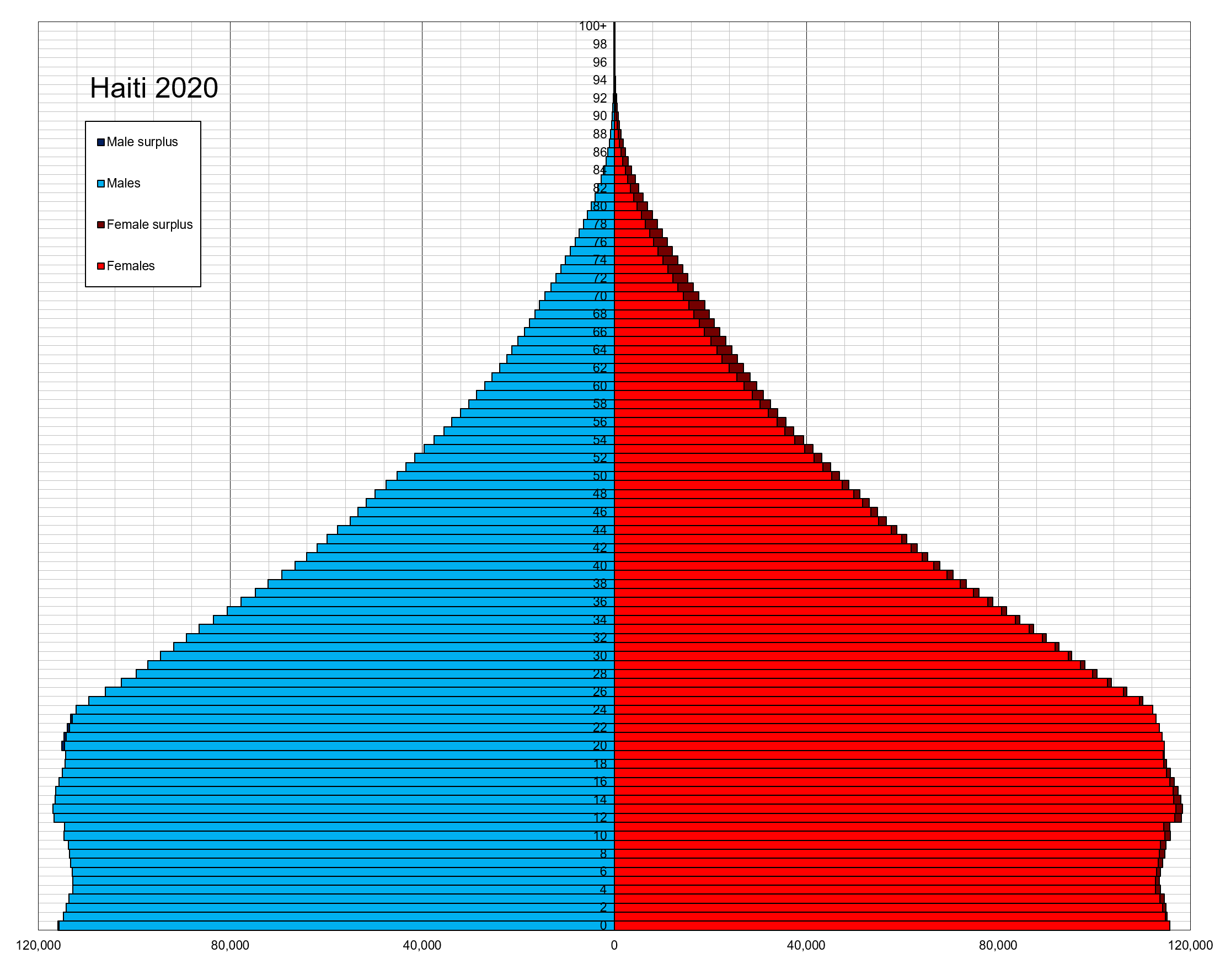
- Population pyramid of Haiti in 2020
- Population: 11,867,032 (2024 projection); 8,812,245 (2003 census)
- Birth rate: 21.12 births/1,000 population (2022 est.)
- Death rate: 7.23 deaths/1,000 population (2022 est.)
- Life expectancy: 65.95 years
  - male: 63.26 years
  - female: 68.67 years
- Fertility rate: 2.43 children born/woman (2022 est.)
- Infant mortality: 40.02 deaths/1,000 live births
- Net migration rate: -1.88 migrant(s)/1,000 population (2022 est.)
- Immigrant share: 0.2% (2024)

Age structure
- 0–14 years: 32.78%
- 15–64 years: 62.49%
- 65 and over: 4.73%

Sex ratio
- Total: 0.97 male(s)/female (2022 est.)
- At birth: 1.01 male(s)/female
- Under 15: 0.99 male(s)/female
- 65 and over: 0.62 male(s)/female

Nationality
- Nationality: Haitian
- Major ethnic: Blacks (95%)
- Minor ethnic: Mulattos and Whites (5%)

Language
- Official: French · Haitian Creole

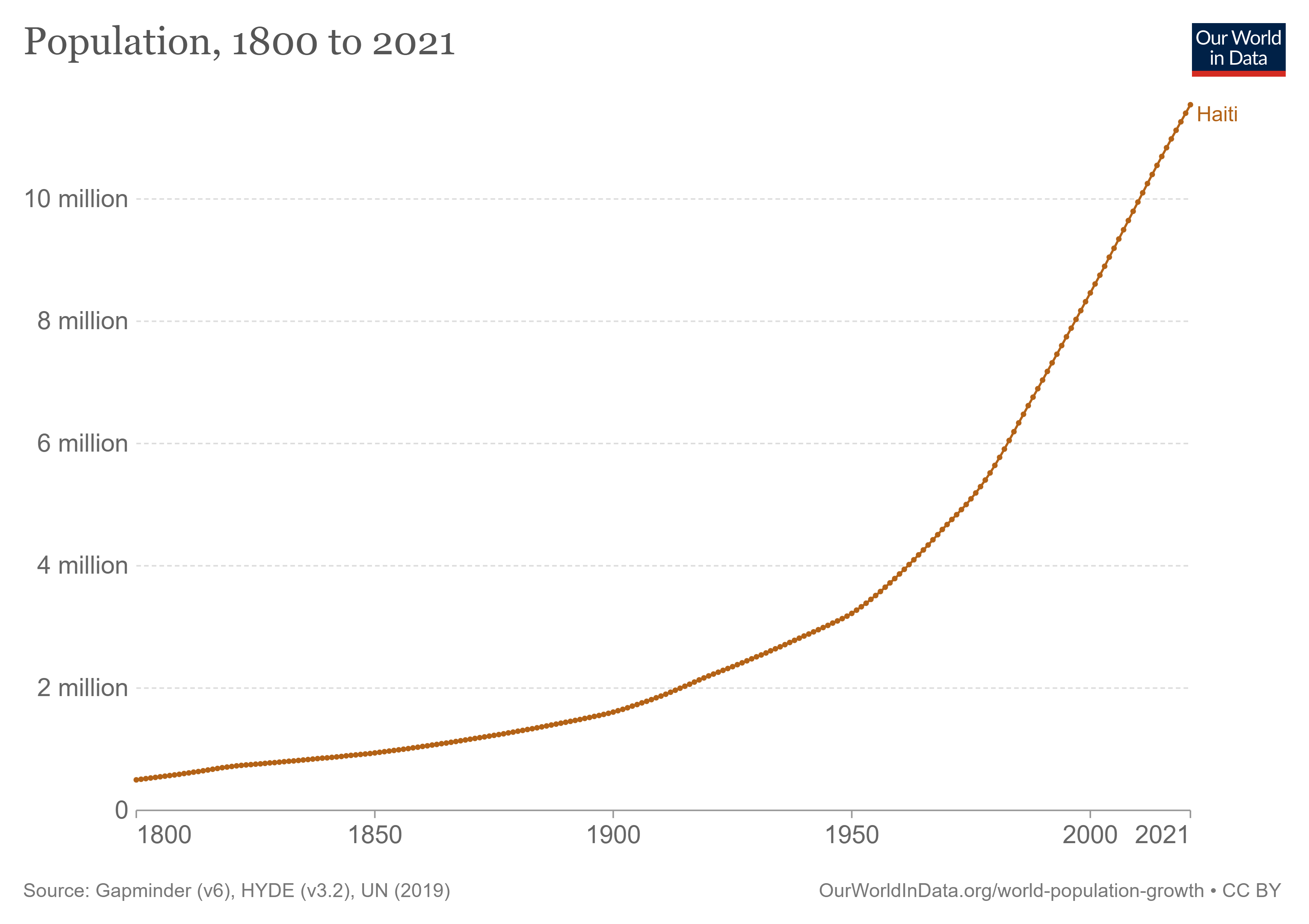
Population of Haiti (in millions) from 1800 to 2021

Haiti is the 83rd most populous country in the world, with an estimated population of 11,123,178 as of July 2018. The last national census in Haiti was done in 2003. Although much of that data has not been released, the population recorded was 8,812,245.

According to population DNA tests, approximately 80% of the population of Haiti is Afro-Haitian. Within Black Haitian DNA, according to a study, the composition is approximately 85% African, the rest are European or mixed European. This is evidenced in DNA ancestry read outs where the average Haitian consistently tests at nearly 80-95 percent sub-Saharan African DNA.

However, there are genetic variations between the population, in the north of the country the average is about 95% African while for the south it is only 75% with more European blood, and much more probability of having native blood, because in the south there were many more mixed-race people, and also some natives living in other French colonies like Guyana and Martinique were sent there

The remaining population of Haiti is primarily composed of Mulattoes, Europeans, Asians, and Arabs. Hispanic residents in Haiti are mostly Cuban and Dominican.

About two-thirds of Haitian people live in rural areas. Several demographic studies, including those by social work researcher Athena Kolbe, have provided estimates of the demographic information of urban residents. In 2006, each Haitian household had an average of 4.5 members.

== Population size and structure ==
According to the 2022 revision of the World Population Prospects the total population of Haiti in 2018 was 11,447,569, as compared to 3,221,000 in 1950. In 2015, the proportion of children below the age of 15 was 36.2%. 59.7% of the population was between 15 and 65 years of age, while 4.5% was 65 years or older. According to the World Bank, Haiti's dependency rate is 7.51 dependents per 100 working age persons.

	Total population	Proportion aged 0–14 (%)	Proportion aged 15–64 (%)	Proportion aged 65+ (%)
1950	3 221 000	39.6	56.7	3.7
1955	3 516 000	39.7	56.9	3.4
1960	3 869 000	40.3	56.5	3.2
1965	4 275 000	41.7	54.9	3.4
1970	4 713 000	41.8	54.5	3.7
1975	5 144 000	41.3	54.8	3.9
1980	5 692 000	41.1	54.9	4.0
1985	6 389 000	42.2	53.8	4.0
1990	7 110 000	43.1	52.9	4.0
1995	7 838 000	42.6	53.5	3.9
2000	8 578 000	40.3	55.7	4.0
2005	9 261 000	38.1	57.8	4.2
2010	10,085,214	36.2	59.7	4.5

=== Structure of the population ===
Population Estimates by Sex and Age Group (01.VII.2010) (Projections produced by l’Institut Haïtien de Statistique et d’Informatique (IHSI) and the Latin American and Caribbean Demographic Centre (CELADE) - Population Division of ECLAC.):

Age group	Male	Female	Total	%
Total	4 993 731	5 091 483	10 085 214	100
0–4	644 550	618 772	1 263 322	12.53
5–9	608 495	586 984	1 195 479	11.85
10–14	588 618	569 860	1 158 478	11.49
15–19	551 467	540 897	1 092 364	10.83
20–24	509 042	510 547	1 019 589	10.11
25–29	454 123	465 513	919 636	9.12
30–34	340 518	362 078	702 596	6.97
35–39	261 157	286 847	548 004	5.43
40–44	235 182	253 300	488 482	4.84
45–49	204 077	219 300	423 377	4.20
50–54	166 418	176 495	342 913	3.40
55–59	136 034	148 697	284 731	2.82
60–64	95 939	110 896	206 835	2.05
65–69	81 854	94 044	175 898	1.74
70–74	58 181	71 255	129 436	1.28
75–79	35 538	45 360	80 898	0.80
80+	22 538	30 638	53 176	0.53
Age group	Male	Female	Total	Percent
0–14	1 841 663	1 775 999	3 617 229	35.87
15–64	2 953 957	3 074 620	6 028 577	59.78
65+	198 111	241 297	439 408	4.36

Population Estimates by Sex and Age Group (01.VII.2011) (Projections produced by l’Institut Haïtien de Statistique et d’Informatique (IHSI) and the Latin American and Caribbean Demographic Centre (CELADE) - Population Division of ECLAC.):

Age group	Male	Female	Total	%
Total	5 075 517	5 172 789	10 248 306	100
0–4	647 465	621 432	1 268 897	12.38
5–9	611 472	589 690	1 201 161	11.72
10–14	591 018	572 066	1 163 085	11.35
15–19	556 085	544 798	1 100 883	10.74
20–24	514 235	514 898	1 029 132	10.04
25–29	465 396	475 451	940 847	9.18
30–34	358 927	379 066	737 993	7.20
35–39	270 574	296 362	566 936	5.53
40–44	237 754	257 273	495 026	4.83
45–49	208 671	224 746	433 416	4.23
50–54	171 468	182 332	353 800	3.45
55–59	140 392	152 742	293 134	2.86
60–64	99 846	114 973	214 819	2.10
65–69	82 201	94 868	177 069	1.73
70–74	59 833	72 957	132 790	1.30
75–79	36 751	47 083	83 834	0.82
80+	23 431	32 053	55 484	0.54
Age group	Male	Female	Total	Percent
0–14	1 849 955	1 783 188	3 633 143	35.45
15–64	3 023 346	3 142 640	6 165 986	60.17
65+	202 216	246 961	449 177	4.38

Population Estimates by Sex and Age Group (01.VII.2018) (Projections produced by l’Institut Haïtien de Statistique et d’Informatique (IHSI) and the Latin American and Caribbean Demographic Centre (CELADE) - Population Division of ECLAC.):

Age group	Male	Female	Total	%
Total	5 659 140	5 752 387	11 411 527	100
0–4	661 535	634 371	1 295 906	11.36
5–9	635 927	611 692	1 247 619	10.93
10–14	608 695	588 396	1 197 091	10.49
15–19	580 801	565 986	1 146 787	10.05
20–24	547 618	542 296	1 089 914	9.55
25–29	504 926	508 355	1 013 281	8.88
30–34	463 541	473 269	936 810	8.21
35–39	387 698	405 499	793 197	6.95
40–44	285 013	309 823	594 836	5.21
45–49	230 537	254 629	485 166	4.25
50–54	206 255	224 859	431 114	3.78
55–59	170 991	186 498	357 489	3.13
60–64	134 300	148 115	282 415	2.47
65–69	97 454	113 753	211 207	1.85
70–74	66 084	80 979	147 063	1.29
75–79	46 188	58 733	104 921	0.92
80+	31 576	45 134	76 710	0.67
Age group	Male	Female	Total	Percent
0–14	1 906 157	1 834 459	3 740 616	32.78
15–64	3 511 681	3 619 329	7 131 010	62.49
65+	241 302	298 599	539 901	4.73

== Vital statistics ==
=== UN estimates ===
The registration of vital events in Haiti is incomplete. The Population Department of the United Nations prepared the following estimates. Population estimates account for under numeration in population censuses.

	Mid-year population	Live births	Deaths	Natural change	Crude birth rate (per 1000)	Crude death rate (per 1000)	Natural change (per 1000)	Crude migration rate (per 1000)	Total fertility rate (TFR)	Infant mortality (per 1000 live births)	Life expectancy (in years)
1950	3,247,000	151,000	87,000	63,000	46.3	26.8	19.5		6.25	248.2	37.48
1951	3,302,000	152,000	87,000	65,000	46.0	26.4	19.6	-2.9	6.24	243.7	37.91
1952	3,359,000	154,000	86,000	68,000	45.8	25.5	20.2	-3.2	6.24	235.1	38.83
1953	3,419,000	156,000	85,000	71,000	45.5	24.7	20.7	-3.2	6.23	227.1	39.70
1954	3,481,000	157,000	84,000	73,000	45.2	24.1	21.0	-3.2	6.22	220.0	40.29
1955	3,546,000	160,000	83,000	77,000	45.0	23.3	21.7	-3.4	6.23	212.9	41.26
1956	3,614,000	162,000	82,000	80,000	44.8	22.7	22.1	-3.3	6.23	206.9	41.96
1957	3,684,000	163,000	82,000	81,000	44.3	22.3	22.0	-3	6.20	203.4	42.36
1958	3,755,000	166,000	83,000	84,000	44.2	21.9	22.3	-3.4	6.22	199.8	42.77
1959	3,828,000	169,000	83,000	86,000	44.0	21.6	22.4	-3.3	6.23	196.6	43.12
1960	3,901,000	170,000	83,000	87,000	43.6	21.3	22.3	-3.6	6.21	193.3	43.50
1961	3,975,000	173,000	83,000	89,000	43.3	20.9	22.4	-3	6.20	190.1	43.91
1962	4,050,000	175,000	83,000	91,000	43.0	20.6	22.5	-4	6.19	187.0	44.29
1963	4,122,000	177,000	89,000	87,000	42.8	21.6	21.2	-3.7	6.18	188.4	42.77
1964	4,196,000	179,000	84,000	95,000	42.5	19.9	22.6	-5	6.18	181.0	44.97
1965	4,274,000	180,000	84,000	96,000	42.0	19.6	22.4	-4.2	6.12	178.0	45.35
1966	4,353,000	181,000	84,000	97,000	41.5	19.4	22.1	-4	6.07	175.2	45.59
1967	4,433,000	183,000	84,000	99,000	41.1	18.9	22.2	-4.2	6.03	171.8	46.13
1968	4,514,000	184,000	84,000	100,000	40.7	18.6	22.1	-4.2	5.97	168.5	46.51
1969	4,597,000	186,000	84,000	102,000	40.3	18.3	22.1	-4	5.93	165.2	46.92
1970	4,681,000	188,000	84,000	103,000	40.0	17.9	22.0	-4.1	5.87	162.0	47.34
1971	4,766,000	189,000	84,000	105,000	39.6	17.6	21.9	-4.1	5.80	158.6	47.72
1972	4,853,000	191,000	85,000	106,000	39.2	17.4	21.8	-3.9	5.72	155.3	47.95
1973	4,941,000	192,000	85,000	107,000	38.8	17.2	21.6	-3.8	5.65	151.6	48.21
1974	5,031,000	197,000	86,000	111,000	39.0	17.1	21.9	-4	5.66	148.0	48.42
1975	5,125,000	202,000	87,000	115,000	39.3	17.0	22.3	-4	5.69	144.6	48.68
1976	5,222,000	207,000	88,000	119,000	39.5	16.9	22.7	-4,1	5.69	141.0	48.96
1977	5,324,000	212,000	89,000	123,000	39.8	16.7	23.0	-3.8	5.68	137.7	49.21
1978	5,429,000	217,000	91,000	126,000	39.8	16.6	23.2	-3.9	5.67	134.4	49.43
1979	5,536,000	222,000	92,000	130,000	39.9	16.5	23.4	-4.1	5.67	131.3	49.68
1980	5,647,000	226,000	93,000	133,000	40.0	16.4	23.6	-3.9	5.65	128.4	49.90
1981	5,760,000	231,000	93,000	138,000	40.1	16.1	23.9	-4.3	5.67	125.4	50.27
1982	5,878,000	237,000	94,000	143,000	40.2	16.0	24.2	-4.1	5.70	122.4	50.55
1983	5,998,000	239,000	95,000	145,000	39.8	15.7	24.1	-4.1	5.66	119.5	50.87
1984	6,120,000	243,000	95,000	148,000	39.6	15.5	24.1	-4.2	5.63	116.8	51.12
1985	6,246,000	248,000	95,000	153,000	39.6	15.2	24.4	-4.2	5.62	114.0	51.52
1986	6,375,000	252,000	96,000	157,000	39.5	15.0	24.5	-4.3	5.61	111.3	51.88
1987	6,508,000	257,000	96,000	161,000	39.3	14.7	24.6	-4.2	5.59	108.4	52.24
1988	6,645,000	260,000	96,000	164,000	39.0	14.4	24.6	-4	5.57	105.8	52.63
1989	6,784,000	263,000	97,000	166,000	38.7	14.2	24.4	-3.9	5.53	103.2	52.76
1990	6,925,000	266,000	97,000	168,000	38.3	14.0	24.2	-3.9	5.48	100.7	52.98
1991	7,066,000	262,000	97,000	166,000	37.1	13.7	23.4	-3.4	5.32	98.0	53.39
1992	7,206,000	262,000	96,000	167,000	36.4	13.3	23.1	-3.7	5.21	95.3	53.84
1993	7,346,000	262,000	95,000	167,000	35.6	12.9	22.7	-3.6	5.10	92.6	54.35
1994	7,486,000	262,000	95,000	167,000	34.9	12.6	22.3	-3.6	4.99	90.5	54.65
1995	7,627,000	262,000	92,000	170,000	34.2	12.0	22.2	-3.7	4.88	87.2	55.55
1996	7,771,000	262,000	91,000	172,000	33.7	11.6	22.0	-3,5	4.78	84.5	56.15
1997	7,915,000	263,000	90,000	173,000	33.2	11.4	21.8	-3.6	4.67	81.7	56.52
1998	8,061,000	263,000	89,000	174,000	32.6	11.0	21.5	-3.4	4.56	79.3	57.14
1999	8,209,000	264,000	87,000	177,000	32.1	10.6	21.5	-3.5	4.45	76.7	57.96
2000	8,360,000	267,000	87,000	180,000	31.8	10.3	21.5	-3.4	4.39	74.4	58.37
2001	8,512,000	264,000	87,000	177,000	31.0	10.2	20.8	-2.9	4.25	72.2	58.49
2002	8,662,000	263,000	87,000	176,000	30.3	10.0	20.3	-3	4.13	70.2	58.86
2003	8,812,000	264,000	86,000	178,000	29.9	9.7	20.2	-3.2	4.04	68.4	59.51
2004	8,961,000	264,000	91,000	173,000	29.5	10.2	19.3	-2.7	3.94	70.7	58.48
2005	9,112,000	265,000	84,000	180,000	29.0	9.2	19.8	-3.2	3.83	65.2	60.42
2006	9,266,000	266,000	84,000	181,000	28.6	9.1	19.5	-2.9	3.74	63.8	60.76
2007	9,421,000	266,000	84,000	182,000	28.2	8.9	19.2	-2.7	3.64	62.6	61.10
2008	9,575,000	267,000	85,000	182,000	27.8	8.9	19.0	-2.9	3.57	61.4	61.33
2009	9,731,000	269,000	85,000	184,000	27.6	8.7	18.9	-2.9	3.51	59.9	61.74
2010	9,843,000	271,000	175,000	96,000	27.5	17.7	9.8	1.6	3.47	75.9	46.02
2011	9,954,000	271,000	87,000	184,000	27.2	8.8	18.4	-7.2	3.41	58.3	61.62
2012	10,109,000	269,000	86,000	183,000	26.6	8.5	18.1	-2.8	3.30	56.7	62.29
2013	10,261,000	268,000	86,000	182,000	26.1	8.4	17.7	-2.9	3.22	55.3	62.61
2014	10,413,000	269,000	86,000	183,000	25.8	8.2	17.5	-2.9	3.16	54.1	62.99
2015	10,564,000	270,000	87,000	183,000	25.5	8.2	17.3	-3	3.11	52.8	63.24
2016	10,714,000	271,000	88,000	183,000	25.3	8.2	17.1	-3.1	3.06	51.8	63.39
2017	10,864,000	272,000	87,000	185,000	25.0	8.0	17.0	-3.2	3.02	50.2	63.85
2018	11,012,000	271,000	88,000	183,000	24.6	8.0	16.6	-3.2	2.96	48.9	64.02
2019	11,160,000	272,000	89,000	183,000	24.3	8.0	16.4	-3.1	2.92	47.8	64.26
2020	11,307,000	271,000	93,000	178,000	23.9	8.2	15.8	-2.8	2.87	46.7	64.05
2021	11,448,000	269,000	99,000	170,000	23.5	8.7	14.8	-2.5	2.81	46.0	63.19

While limited, some evidence suggests that large scale disasters can cause human populations to increase in the long term, rather than decrease. Accordingly, in Haiti's case, some sources reported that a tripled fertility rate was expected after the 2010 Haiti earthquake. However, data since then does not show a diversion from the pre-disaster trend of decreasing fertility rates.

View source data.
View source data.
View source data.
View source data.
View source data.

=== Demographic and Health Surveys ===
The Total Fertility Rate (TFR) (Wanted Fertility Rate) and Crude Birth Rate (CBR):

Year	CBR (Total)	TFR (Total)	CBR (Urban)	TFR (Urban)	CBR (Rural)	TFR (Rural)
1994–95	34	4.8 (3.0)	31	3.3 (2.2)	35	5.9 (3.7)
2000	32.6	4.7 (2.7)	29.4	3.3 (2.0)	34.0	5.8 (3.4)
2005–2006	28.7	4.0 (2.4)	26.2	2.8 (1.8)	30.1	5.0 (2.9)
2012	27.8	3.5 (2.2)	24.4	2.6 (1.9)	29.4	4.4 (2.6)
2016–17	24.3	3.0 (1.9)	21.1	2.1 (1.5)	26.3	3.9 (2.3)

=== Life expectancy at birth ===
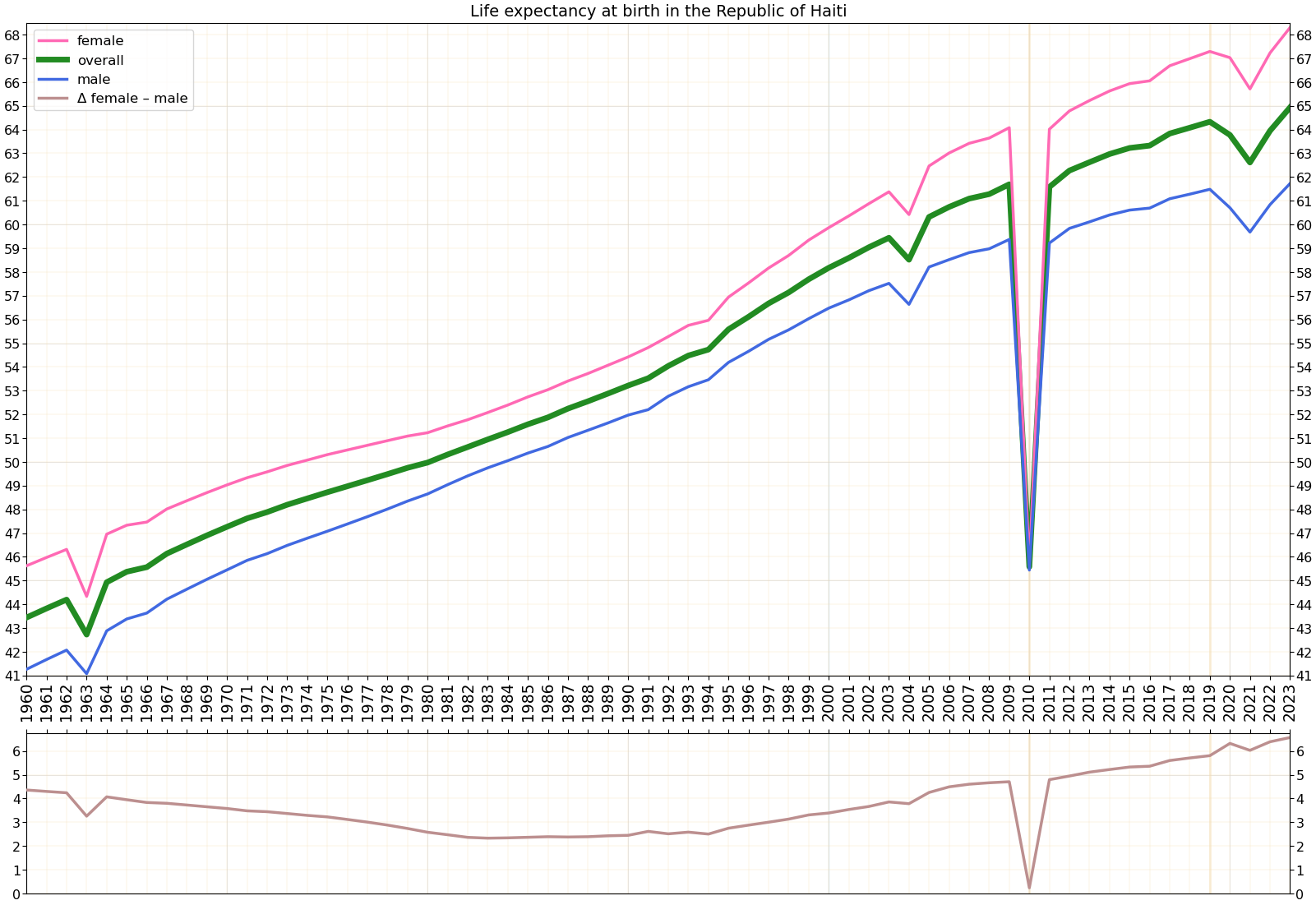
Life expectancy at birth in Haiti

total population: 64.6 years
male: 61.9 years
female: 67.2 years (2018 est.)

== Ethnic groups ==
The population of Haiti is 95% of African descent, with the rest in Haitian society from marrying-in, immigrating through various times, or have origin since the Haitian Revolution.

- Afro-Haitians
- French Haitians
- Mulatto Haitians
- Taínos
- Cubans
- Indo-Haitians
- Arab Haitians
- German Haitians
- Polish Haitians
- Dominicans
- Chinese Haitians
- White Haitians
- Italian Haitians
- Marabous

== Languages ==
Taíno was the major pre-Columbian language in the region of what is Haiti (or Ayti), a name referring to the entire island of Hispaniola. The phrase means "land of high mountains."

Today, the Republic of Haiti has two official languages, French and Haitian Creole. Haitian Creole is a French-based creole with 90% of its vocabulary derived from French and influenced by Portuguese, Spanish, Taíno, and various West African languages. French is the primary written and administrative language (as well as the main language of the press) and is spoken by 42% of Haitians. The language is generally spoken by educated Haitians, is the medium of instruction in most schools, and is used in the business sector. It is also spoken in ceremonial events such as weddings, graduations, and church masses.

Haiti is one of two independent nations in the Americas (along with Canada) to designate French as an official language; other French-speaking areas are all overseas départements, or collectivités, of France. Haitian Creole, which was recently standardized, is spoken by virtually the entire population of Haiti. It is related to the other French creoles but most closely to the Antillean Creole and Louisiana Creole variants.

Spanish is spoken by some Haitians along the border with the Dominican Republic, as well as by some who have been deported from Spanish-speaking countries. English is used increasingly within the business sector, but only by a small proportion of the total population.

== Religion ==
The most common religions in Haiti are Roman Catholicism, Pentecostalism and Baptist. The state religion is Roman Catholicism, which is professed by 55–60% of the population. 30–35% of Haitians practice Protestantism, mostly Pentecostalism, which arrived in Haiti in the 1970s. Almost 99% of Haitians claim to be a part of at least one religion, with a fraction of them practicing some part of Vodou along with another religion.

Vodou bears similarities to Cuban Santeria due to the large Cuban population in Haiti. The practice of Vodou revolves around family spirits called Lwa that protect children. To repay the spirits, children perform two ceremonies where the Lwa are given gifts like food and drinks. The timing of the ceremonies depends on the monetary status of the family performing them; poorer families try to save money, waiting until there is a need to perform the rituals. The practice of Vodou is rare among the urban elite.

Modern day Vodou has been shaped by both Protestant and Catholic Christianity. Under the rule of the Catholic French, the population was not allowed to practice Vodou. However, they were occasionally allowed to have dances on the weekends. These dances were actually disguised Vodou services. The underground practice of Vodou continued until Haiti gained its independence in 1804. Most Haitians see practicing both Vodou and Christianity as normal due to their significant similarities. The Catholic Church, however, was not always as accepting of Vodou. In 1941–42, a holy war was declared against Vodou, leading to the deaths of many high level religious officials in the Vodou religion. Persecution of the religion largely ended in 1950 when the Catholics gave up trying to prosecute those who practiced Vodou. Protestants, however, are still critical of the religion, often describing it as "devil worship".

A fictionalized version of Vodou, commonly called "voodoo", has been used in American movies and by authors such as H.P. Lovecraft. Vodou and voodoo are not conceptually the same, although the idea of "voodoo" lives on in American pop culture.

== Migration ==
=== Emigration ===
Large-scale emigration, principally to the Dominican Republic, United States, and Canada (predominantly to Quebec) has created what Haitians refer to as the Eleventh Department or the diaspora. Significant numbers of Haitians have also emigrated to Cuba, France and French Guiana, Spain, Belgium, the United Kingdom and Ireland, Venezuela, Brazil, Chile, the Bahamas and other Caribbean countries. Approximately one in every six Haitians lives abroad.

=== Immigration ===
45,000 Americans live in Haiti. They represent 0.4% of Haiti's total population.

== See also ==
- Haitians in the Dominican Republic
- Haitian Americans
- Saint-Domingue Creoles
