= Italian Haitians =

Haitian citizens of Italian descent

Italo-haitiani (Italian) Italyen ayisyen (Haitian Creole) Haïtiens italiens (French)

Total population
- c. 100 (by birth) c. 5,000 (by ancestry)

Regions with significant populations
- Port-au-Prince, Pétion-Ville

Languages
- Haitian Creole · Haitian French · Italian and Italian dialects

Religion
- Catholicism

Related ethnic groups
- Italians, Italian Americans, Italian Argentines, Italian Bolivians, Italian Brazilians, Italian Canadians, Italian Chileans, Italian Colombians, Italian Costa Ricans, Italian Cubans, Italian Dominicans, Italian Ecuadorians, Italian Guatemalans, Italian Hondurans, Italian Mexicans, Italian Panamanians, Italian Paraguayans, Italian Peruvians, Italian Puerto Ricans, Italian Salvadorans, Italian Uruguayans, Italian Venezuelans

Italian Haitians (Italian: italo-haitiani; Haitian Creole: italyen ayisyen; French: haïtiens italiens) are Haitian-born citizens who are fully or partially of Italian descent, whose ancestors were Italians who emigrated to Haiti during the Italian diaspora, or Italian-born people in Haiti.

== History ==
Italian explorer Christopher Columbus explored the Haiti region.

The Italian presence in Haiti dates to the era of the French colony of Saint-Domingue.

During colonial times only a few Italians went to Haiti: most of them were Catholic missionaries, with a few merchants and soldiers.

The business sector of Haiti was dominated by German and Italian immigrants in the mid-19th century. In 1908 there were 160 Italians residing in Haiti, according to the Italian consul De Matteis, of whom 128 lived in the capital Port-au-Prince.

During the 2010 earthquake in Port-au-Prince, the first Italian recorded dead was 70-year-old Gigliola Martino, who was born in Haiti to Italian parents who emigrated to the country in the early 20th century.

Daphnée Duplaix, an American actress and model born in New York City, is of Haitian and Italian descent.

Stella Jean is a fashion designer in Italy whose mother is Haitian and her father is Italian.

In 2011, according to the Italian census, there were 134 Italians who were residents in Haiti, nearly all of them living in the capital. However, there were nearly 5,000 Haitians with recent or distant Italian roots (according to the Italian embassy).

== Notable Italian Haitians ==
- Sherif Abdallah, insurance businessman and a close associate of former Haitian President Jovenel Moïse.
- Regine Chevallier, fashion designer
- Daphnée Duplaix, actress and model
- Lindsay Zullo, footballer

== See also ==
- White Haitians
- German Haitians
- Polish Haitians
- Marabou Haitians
- Lebanese Haitians
- Jewish Haitians

== Links ==
- Hossary, Nagia (Archive article)

== Bibliography ==
- Commissariato dellemigrazione. Emigrazione e colonie, Volume 3: Raccolta di rapporti dei RR. agenti diplomatici e consolari.Tipografia nazionale di G. Bertero & comp. Roma, 1908
