= Marabou (ethnicity) =

Haitian term denoting mixed race admixture

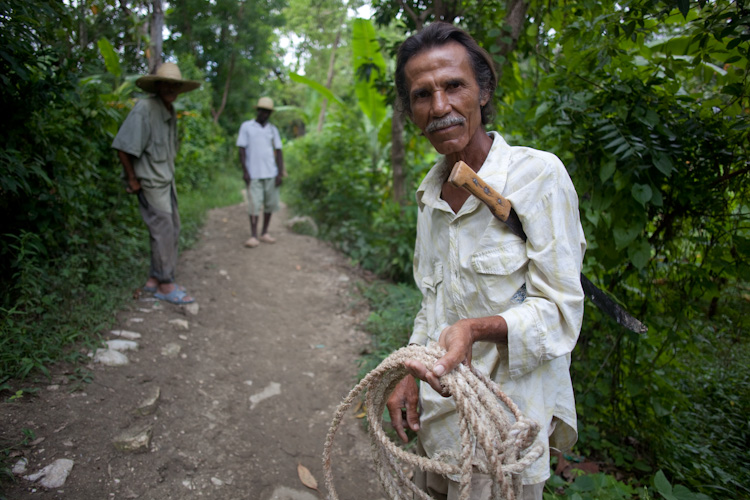
- Marabou Haitian man

Total population
- 590,000+

Regions with significant populations
- Haiti, United States, Canada, France

Languages
- French, Haitian Creole, French-based creole languages, Frespañol

Religion
- Predominantly Roman Catholic, but also Anglican, Protestant, Baptist, Seventh-day Adventist Church and Jehovah's Witness

Related ethnic groups
- Afro-Caribbeans, Dougla, Affranchi

Marabou (/ˈmærəbu/; French: marabout) is a term of Haitian origin denoting Haitians of mixed race ancestry. The term comes originally from the African Marabouts. Marabous are mainly descended from intermingling between Africans, Europeans, Asian and indigenous Taino.

The Marabou label dates to the colonial period of Haiti's history, meaning the offspring of a mulatto and a griffe person. However, Médéric-Louis-Elie Moreau de Saint-Méry, in his three volume work on the colony, describes Marabous as the product of the union of an African/European and a Taino.

== See also ==
- Mulatto Haitians
- Afro-Haitians
- White Haitians
- Indo-Haitians
- Chinese Haitians
- Zambo
- Indo-African (disambiguation)
- Dougla people
- Arab Haitians
- Italian Haitians
- French Haitians
- German Haitians
