= Haitian language =

Haitian language may refer to:

- Haitian Creole (kreyòl ayisyen), a French-based creole language native to Haiti
- Haitian French, the variety of French spoken in Haiti
- Taíno language, an extinct indigenous language spoken in Haiti (or Hayti), the rest of the Greater Antilles and the Lucayan Archipelago; previously coined the Haitian language (or Haytian language)

== See also ==
- Languages of Haiti, the languages spoken or once spoken in Haiti
