= Palestinian Haitians =

Palestinian Haitian فلسطينيو هايتي
Regions with significant populations
- Port-au-Prince

Languages
- French, Haitian Creole, Arabic

Religion
- Christianity, Islam

Related ethnic groups
- Arab Haitians

Palestinian Haitians (French: Haïtiens palestiniens; Haitian Creole: Ayisyen Palestinyen; Arabic: الهايتيين الفلسطينيين) are Haitians of Palestinian descent, or Palestinians with Haitian citizenship. Haiti received a score of Palestinian refugees during the 1948 Nakba.

== Notable Palestinian Haitians ==
- Antoine Izméry, murdered wealthy businessman and political activist
- Nathalie Handal, award-winning poet, writer, and playwright
- Roger Jaar, successful businessman
- Issa El-Saieh (1919-2005) musician, band leader, businessman, gallerist, art collector and philanthropist

== See also ==
- Arab Haitians
- Mulatto Haitians
- Lebanese Haitians
- Syrian Haitians
- White Haitians
