= Syrian Haitians =

Ethnic group in Haiti

Syrian Haitian
Total population
- 300 (Syrians in Haiti)

Regions with significant populations
- Port-au-Prince, Pétion-Ville, Cap-Haïtien

Languages
- French, Haitian Creole, Arabic

Religion
- Melkite Greek Catholic, Islam, Judaism

Related ethnic groups
- Arabs, Jews

Syrian Haitians (French: Haïtiens Syriens; Haitian Creole: Ayisyen Siryen; Arabic: الهايتيين السوريين) are Haitian of Syrian descent or a Syrian with Haitian citizenship. A small Syrian community exists in Haiti.

== History ==
Since the early twentieth century there was a Syrian community in Haiti. This consisted of roughly 500 people, mainly engaged in trade and many of them were Syrian Americans. The entire business community of Syrians, however, tended to sell their products to the United States. Over time, the importance of these merchant foreigners grew, reaching positions in the political order of Haiti. It is of enormous importance to Haiti, that surpassing most of the Haitians in government (one that was formed by the social elite of Haiti, against a poor majority), caused major uprisings against the Syrians and the idea widespread among Haitians was that they should be deported.

Therefore, the Syrian American club sent a letter to the U.S. State Department of Washington D.C., explaining the reasons why the island was purchased for trade with the U.S. and asked for help and advice from the U.S. Federal Government. At that time the Syrians had also addressed the majority of imports of goods to Haiti, both in the field of provisions as in beverages. Syrian traders also were, at present, the only foreign traders willing to work under native conditions than other groups of traders that were rejected. So, they sold wholesale. However, these traders were occupied all trades with the country, which made them gain rejection of a significant part of the population.

Thus, the Haitian government launched a new political program that limited the Syrian trade in the country. Now, the Syrians would have to have a license to import and a patent to sell. This caused a cost by Syrian merchants $150 per year. Over time, the system was varied occasionally. However, the rejection of Haitians to the Syrian merchants, who were occupying the entire profession merchant, led a revolt in late August 1911. In this revolt, an opposition political party the government created, in order to get votes, was a slogan calling for the expulsion of the Syrian community. This slogan was immensely popular.

Thus, the leader of this party was elected as the new president of Haiti and he banned the Syrians from setting up enterprises in the country and removed the license they had to trade. Also, after two months since December 9 of 1911, the Syrians could no longer perform more importations to Haiti and six months from the same date they should remove all their undertakings. Because most of the Syrians from Haiti were merchants, they had to migrate to other places to survive. 114 Syrian traders had licenses, of which 12 were Americans.

== Notable people ==
- Gilbert Bigio, Haiti's only billionaire

== See also ==
- Islam in Haiti
- Arab Haitians
- History of the Jews in Haiti
- Lebanese Haitian
- Mulatto Haitian
- Palestinian Haitian
- White Haitian
