= Arab Haitians =

Ethnic diaspora

Total population
- 500,000 to 1 million

Regions with significant populations
- Port-au-Prince, Les Cayes, Pétion-Ville, Gonaïves

Languages
- Haitian French, Haitian Creole, Arabic

Religion
- Christianity, Islam, Judaism

Related ethnic groups
- Syrians, Lebanese, Palestinians, Jews

Arab Haitians (French: haïtiens levantins; Haitian Creole: Ayisyen levantin) are Haitians of full or partial Arab ancestry, including immigrants to Haiti.

== History ==
The first Arab immigrants arrived in Haiti in the mid 19th century from the Levant. Many of Levantines migrated to the countryside where they peddled and were very informal economically speaking. World War I, which took place when Lebanon was part of the Germany-allied Ottoman Empire, triggered a Lebanese migration to the Americas, with Haiti receiving a large number of Lebanese immigrants. Haiti also received a score of Palestinian refugees during the 1948 Nakba.

The exact size of the Levantine population in Haiti is difficult to determine. Historian Charles Dupuy estimates that between 15,000 and 20,000 Levantines lived in Haiti in 1903, while a report by United States Minister W. F. Powell estimated that there were “nearly fifteen thousand” Syrians in the republic. In his diplomatic report, Powell emphasized the extent of their commercial network, observing that “there is no road anywhere in the Republic where one of these people can not be found,” referring to the widespread presence of Levantine itinerant merchants throughout Haiti.

The visibility of the Levantines in commerce generated a strong nationalist backlash. Haitian journalists and editorialists, rather than the American diplomatic report, described their presence in markedly xenophobic terms. Le Devoir, which adopted the slogan “Haiti for Haitians,” complained that the commercial streets of Port-au-Prince appeared filled with Levantines and questioned whether one was “in Haiti or in Syria.” Other newspapers warned of a supposed “Syrian peril” (péril syrien) and portrayed the Levantines as an invading commercial force that had spread throughout Port-au-Prince and the country’s principal cities, displacing Haitian merchants and threatening the national economy. These statements reflected the nationalist and anti-Levantine rhetoric of the period rather than an objective description of the community.

Contemporary accounts also reflected the intensity of the anti-Arab sentiments A 1904 New York Times article reporting an anti Syrian riots stated that the Levantine population numbered 15,000 and that they were “infesting” the city. The article reports attacks on Syrian merchants.

Despite this hostility, Levantine immigrants gradually integrated into Haitian society through intermarriage and participation in the country’s economic and social life. According to Charles Dupuy, their descendants no longer constitute a separate Arab community in Haiti. With the exception of a few culinary traditions and rare family customs, little of the ancestral culture has been preserved. Later generations generally no longer speak Arabic and identify simply as Haitians rather than as members of a distinct Arab community. As a result of more than a century of intermarriage and assimilation, the descendants of the initial Levantine migration waves are estimated to number between 500,000 and one million people. This figure refers to Haitians with at least one Levantine (Arab) ancestor, rather than to members of a distinct Arab community. Many of these descendants are fully integrated into Haitian society, and many are Black Haitians whose Levantine ancestry represents only one part of their family history.

== Notable people ==
- Sherif Abdallah, Egyptian-born insurance businessman
- Gilbert Bigio, billionaire businessman and the wealthiest person in Haiti until his death in 2026.
- André Apaid, businessman and political activist
- Lody Jean, judge
- Antoine Izméry, murdered wealthy businessman and political activist (Palestinian descent)
- Issa El-Saieh, musician, band leader, businessman, gallerist, art collector and philanthropist
- John Boulos, professional soccer player
- Robert Malval, Prime Minister of Haiti (1993–1994)
- Steeven Saba, soccer player
- Naïka, singer

== See also ==
- Lebanese Haitians
- Mulatto Haitians
- Palestinian Haitians
- Syrian Haitians
- White Haitians
