= Regine Chevallier =

Haitian fashion designer

- Born: Regine Chevallier; Port-au-Prince, Haiti
- Occupations: Fashion designer; Businesswoman

Regine Chevallier (French pronunciation: [ʁeʒin ʃəvalje]) is a Haitian fashion designer. She has earned the title, "Hat Lady to the Stars" for her unique collection of "Haute Summer Hats".

== Biography ==
Chevallier is from Port-au-Prince, Haiti and maintains a fashion-house based in Miami. She draws on her European-Haitian heritage for influence for her designs; a melange of African, French and Italian.

Chevallier is a former Consulate General of the Republic of Haiti in Miami.
