= Sherif Abdallah =

Haitian businessman

- Born: 18 August 1958 (age 67); Cairo, Egypt

Sherif Abdallah (born 18 August 1958) is an Egyptian and Haitian businessman and entrepreneur. Born in Cairo to an Egyptian father and an Italian mother, Abdallah emigrated to Haiti in 1981. He founded an insurance company Les Assurances Léger S.A., a helicopter rental company, and a hotel and conference center.

== Background ==
Abdallah was born in Cairo, Egypt, in 1958 and is the son of an Egyptian father and an Italian mother. He emigrated to Haiti in 1981.

== Business ==
Over the past four decades, he has contributed to Haiti's economic development through ventures in tourism, real estate, banking, aviation, public service, and charitable activities. His efforts have been driven by a commitment to liberal democracy, good governance, and international commerce. Abdallah has also been active in responding to various crises in Haiti, providing support to public and private organizations.

== Italian Consul ==
Since 2012, Abdallah has served as the Honorary Italian General Consul in Port-au-Prince. In recognition of his service, he was honored as a Knight of the Order of the Star of Italy by President Sergio Mattarella.

== Canadian government sanctions ==
On December 5, 2022, the Canadian government imposed sanctions on several Haitian businessmen, including Abdallah, alleging financial support for gangs. Abdallah denies any involvement and subsequently resigned from the board of directors at Sogebank, one of Haiti's largest commercial banks. He is represented by legal firms in the United States and Canada.

== See also ==
- Arab Haitians
