= Lody Jean =

Haitian-American judge

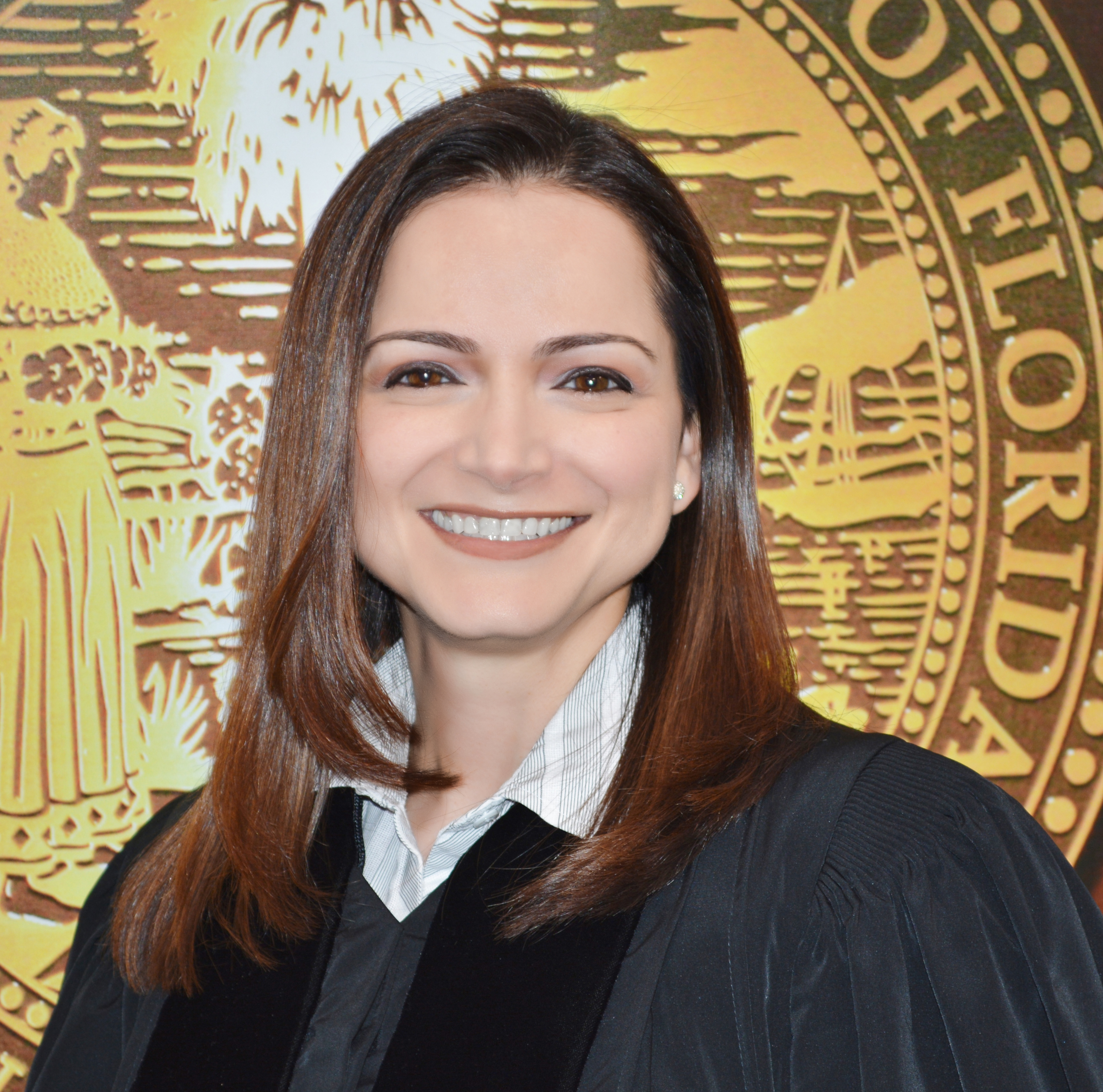
- Judge Lody Jean, December 16, 2019

Judge of the Florida's 11th Circuit Court
- Incumbent
- Assumed office April 17, 2020

Personal details
- Born: 20 October 1978 (age 47) Port-au-Prince, Haiti
- Education: University of Miami (BA); St. Thomas University School of Law (JD)

Lody Jean (born 20 October 1978) is a judge in Florida's 11th Judicial Circuit Court, Criminal Division. She was appointed to the court on April 17, 2020, by Governor Ron DeSantis to replace John Schlesinger. Jean served on the Miami-Dade County Court, Civil Division, from April 2019, until her appointment to the circuit court. She was the first Haitian-American woman to be appointed on the Miami-Dade County Court and is the first Haitian-American to be appointed to the Eleventh Circuit Court.

== Early life ==
Jean was born and raised in Port-au-Prince by a Haitian father and Lebanese mother. Jean was the president of the student council at Quisqueya Christian School and often made the honor roll. As a child, she dreamed of going overseas to become a doctor, then return to Haiti to work.

== Career ==
While in law school, Jean interned with Legal Services of Greater Miami where she worked with staff on the Haitian Citizenship Project, a program for individuals of primarily Haitian descent who needed assistance applying for naturalization. Jean also interned at the Third District Court of Appeal, the Miami-Dade Public Defender's Office, and the Broward State Attorney's Office.

From 2012-2018, Jean served on the Florida Bar's Unlicensed Practice Law Committee, a voluntary committee of non-attorneys and attorneys who investigate the unlicensed practice of law in Miami-Dade County. Between 2004 and 2012, Jean served with the State Attorney of Miami-Dade County as an Assistant State Attorney and then as a Felony Division Chief. On November 16, 2018, Governor Rick Scott appointed Jean as Judge to the Miami-Dade County Court. Two years later, on April 17, 2020, Governor Ron DeSantis elevated Jean to serve on Florida's 11th Judicial Circuit Court in Miami-Dade County, becoming the first Haitian-American to serve in Florida's 11th Judicial Circuit Court. She is currently assigned to the Circuit's criminal division

On December 13, 2024, Jean approved a bond based on the state attorney's recommendations, for alleged rapist and sex traffickers, Oren and Alon Alexander who were immediately taken into custody by the FBI on more federal charges.
