= Lebanese Haitians =

Ethnic group of Haiti

Total population
- 12,000

Regions with significant populations
- Haiti

Languages
- French, Haitian Creole (Note: Given as languages used by Arab Haitians in general by the Library of Congress Country Studies.)

Related ethnic groups
- Arab Haitians

Lebanese Haitians (French: Haïtiens libanais; Haitian Creole: Ayisyen Libanè; Arabic: الهايتيين اللبنانيين) are Haitians of Lebanese descent, one of several groups of Arab Haitians. Their history dates back to the late 1800s, when many individuals left Lebanon for the Americas, including Haiti. They are active in a variety of industries, including retail and telecommunications. As of 2010, their population was estimated at 12,000. As a minority with a position of relative power in the Haitian economy, they have faced ethnic discrimination, notably encouraged by gang leader Jimmy Chérizier.

== History ==
Lebanon saw widespread emigration to the Americas during the second half of the 19th century as a result of regional and international conflicts, such as the ethnic conflict between the Maronite Christians and the Druze in 1860. Lebanese individuals travelled to the United States, Canada, Brazil, Argentina, and various other Latin American states. These migrants began arriving in Haiti during the 1880s. In some cases, migrants attempting to reach the United States stopped in Haiti and decided to stay. They were followed by other groups of Arabs, including Syrians, Jordanians, and Palestinians.

This immigration has continued into more recent times, and in 2010, there were estimated to be 8,000 Lebanese Haitians. Many are active in the retail and telecommunications industries, trading pearls, owning stores (especially supermarkets), and working as engineers. After the 2010 Haiti earthquake, Lebanese engineers employed by Digicel worked to repair the damaged telecommunications network, including two who were on leave in Lebanon and returned to help their colleagues in Haiti.

== Demographics ==
The 12,000 or so Lebanese Haitians are part of a larger Arab Haitian community, the largest subgroup of which being Syrian Haitians. As of 2010, the total population of Haiti was estimated at 10 million.

== Discrimination ==
After the assassination of Jovenel Moïse in 2021, former police officer and gang leader Jimmy Chérizier, who described the event as an "international conspiracy", called on his followers to engage in violence against the "masters of the system". This included business owners of Syrian and Lebanese descent, whom Chérizier urged to leave the country, stating that supermarkets should by owned by "folks who looks [sic] like us". In a 2023 interview with Jon Lee Anderson, Chérizier further blamed "the Lebanese" for Haiti's problems, describing them as "oligarchs" who kept Black Haitians from having the same wealth and opportunities.

A 2022 report by the US Department of State made note of the ethnic discrimination faced by the relatively economically powerful Syrian-Lebanese community.

== Notable Lebanese Haitians ==
- Michelle Buteau, American-born comedian and television host of partial Haitian Lebanese descent through her father.
- Robert Malval, Prime Minister of Haiti (1993−1994) his mother is Lebanese.
- Lody Jean, Judge born to a Haitian father and a Lebanese mother.

== See also ==
- Arab Haitians
- Palestinian Haitians
- Syrian Haitians
