= French Haitians =

Ayisyen Franse (Haitian Creole); French Haitian (English); Haïtiens Français (French)

Total population
- 500,000 (Full or partial) 900 Nationals (French nationals and Descendants estimated).

Regions with significant populations
- Port-au-Prince, Pétion-Ville, Jacmel, Fond-des-Blancs

Languages
- French · Haitian Creole

Religion
- Roman Catholicism, minority of Irreligion

Related ethnic groups
- French people, Mulatto Haitians, White Haitians, French Canadians, Québécois, Acadians, Cajuns

French Haitians, also called Franco-Haitians (French: Haïtiens Français; Haitian Creole: Ayisyen Franse) are citizens of Haiti of full or partial French ancestry. The term is sometimes also applied to Haitians who migrated to France in the 20th and 21st century and who have acquired French citizenship, as well to their descendants.

== Colonization ==
The story begins with the issuing of French adventurers in the Tortuga Island, which was close to the Spanish colony of Santo Domingo. As a result in the late 17th century, the French had de facto control of the island close to the Spanish colony. The wars of Louis XIV in Europe finally convinced the Spaniards to give the island to the French under to the Treaty on Ryswick (1697). The French called their new colony Saint-Domingue. And they began transforming the settlement into a large sugar plantation. Later the Frenchmen began to bring large numbers of African slaves to work on plantations, the destruction of the Taino and African imports changed the demographics of St Domingue. By the late 17th century, the French made up 90% of the nation, with more than 1,000 settlers and their descendants (note that Haiti had a European past), but as the number of black people grew faster, they acceded to a mix between French and black people, which resulted in a fast growth of mulattos, although in some cases the mixing occurred two or more times. The French could notice that some mulatto were clearer than others. By the early 18th century, mulattos and slaves started to compose the majority of the colony, blacks continued to be used as slaves for the production of sugar, which was in demand in Western Europe. That made the French put much pressure and cruelty to blacks to speed the production.

=== Haitian massacres and slave revolt ===
In 1791, the first revolt of slaves and mulattos occurred; this was driven primarily by desires for equal rights to blacks, the abolition of slavery, and a demand for increased equity between racial groups. This caused indignation with the French government in Paris, and the reaction was swift. Whites in Saint-Domingue began indiscriminate attacks and lynchings on blacks and mulattos, regardless of gender or age. Another uprising occurred in 1804, this time led by the slaves: Toussaint Louverture, Jean-Jacques Dessalines and Henri Christophe. During the revolution, freed slaves and other disenfranchised members of the population carried out brutal and thorough reprisals on the white population and their property. Following the sharp increase in violence, surviving French subjects and their families fled the colony. This resulted in a notable reduction of French people in Haiti.

== Notable French Haitians ==
- Joseph Bunel
- Charles Frédéric Chassériau
- Thomas-Alexandre Dumas
- Marie-Madeleine Lachenais
- Josaphat-Robert Large
- Jean-Louis Michel
- Philippe Vorbe
- Naïka

== See also ==
- France–Haiti relations
- White Haitians
