= Port-au-Prince =

Capital and largest city of Haiti

Port-au-Prince Pòtoprens (Haitian Creole)
- Capital city and commune
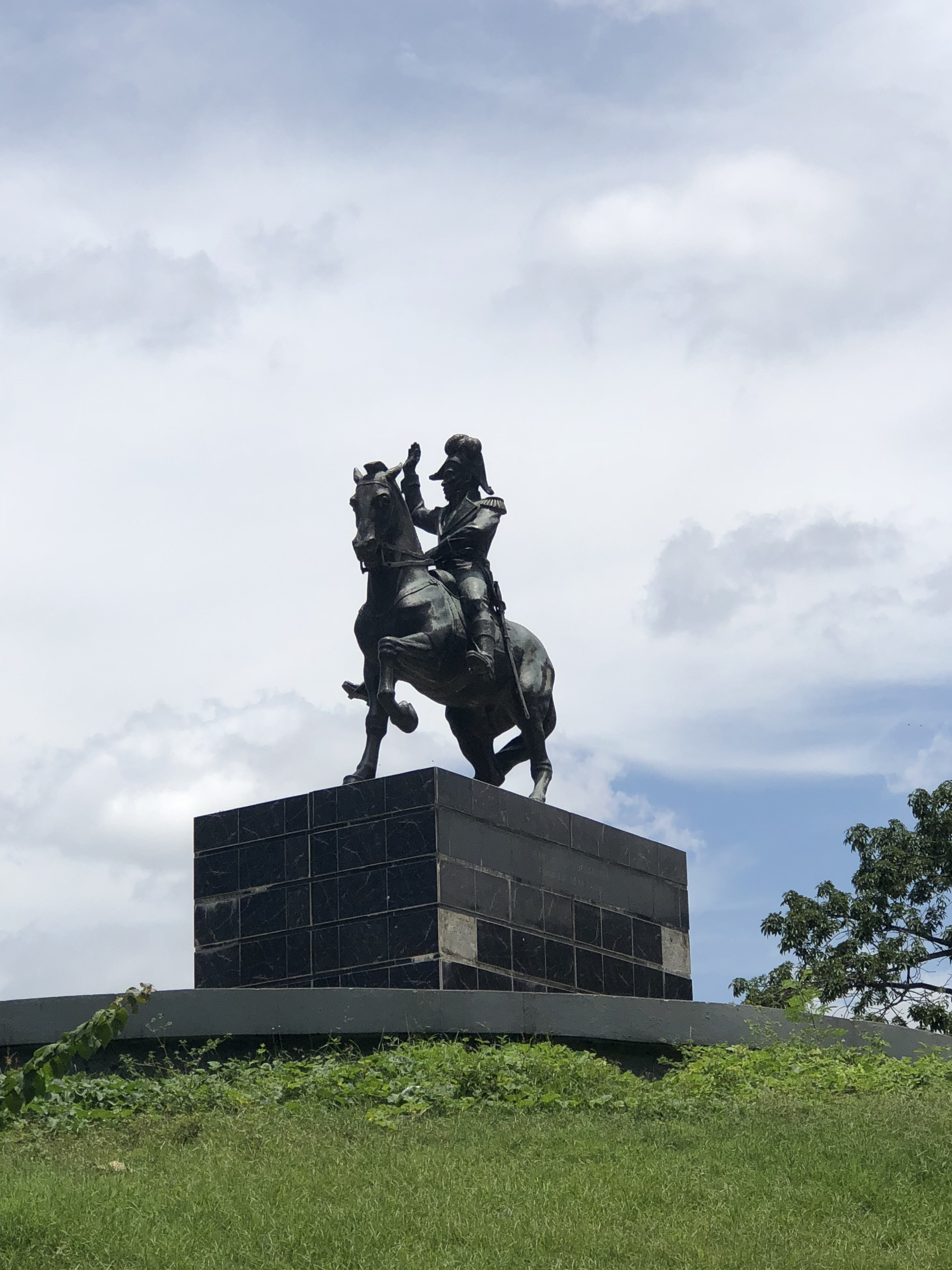
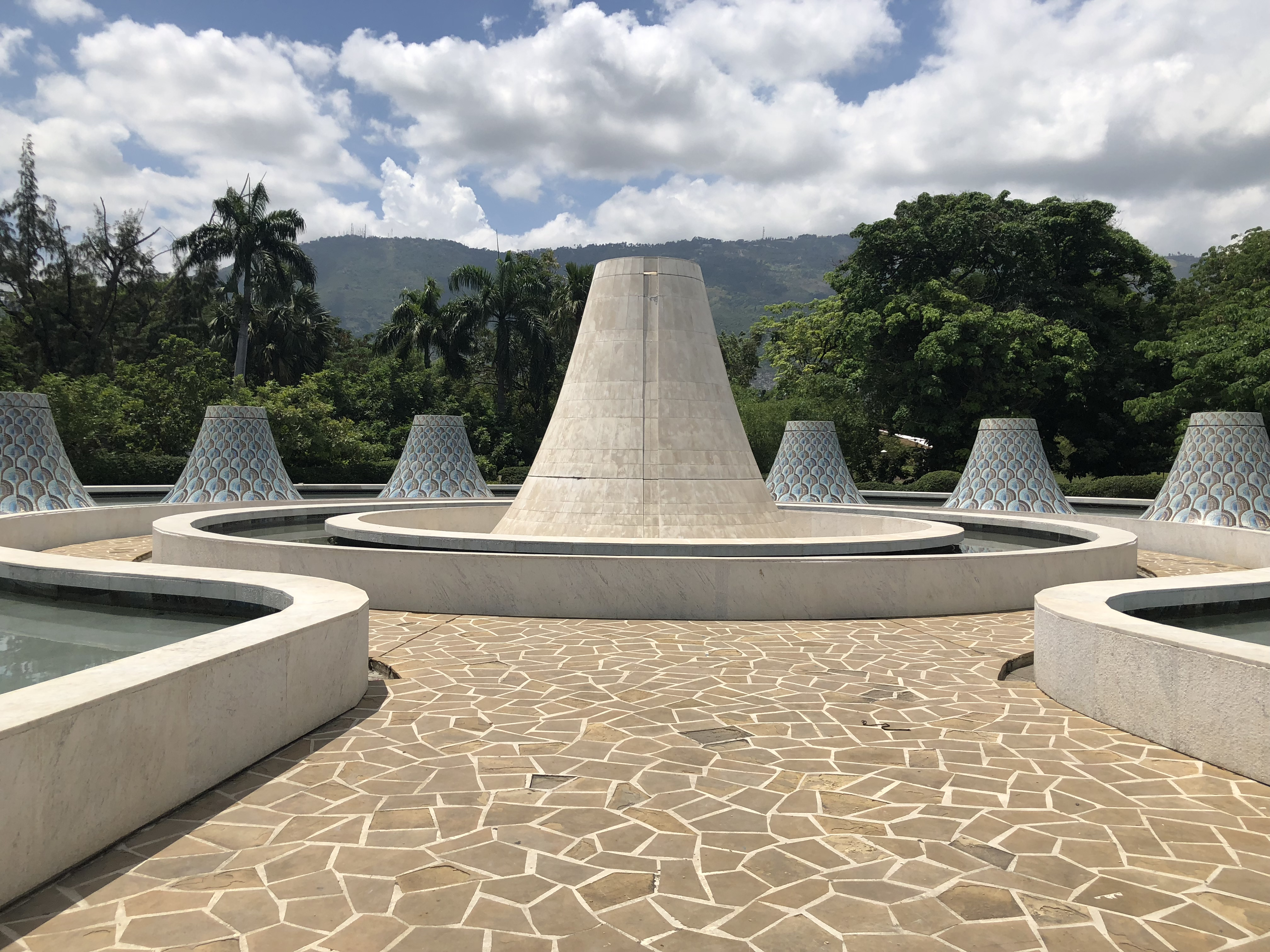
- Aerial view of Port-au-Prince after the 2010 Haitian earthquake Haiti National Palace in 2009 Jean-Jacques Dessalines MUPANAH

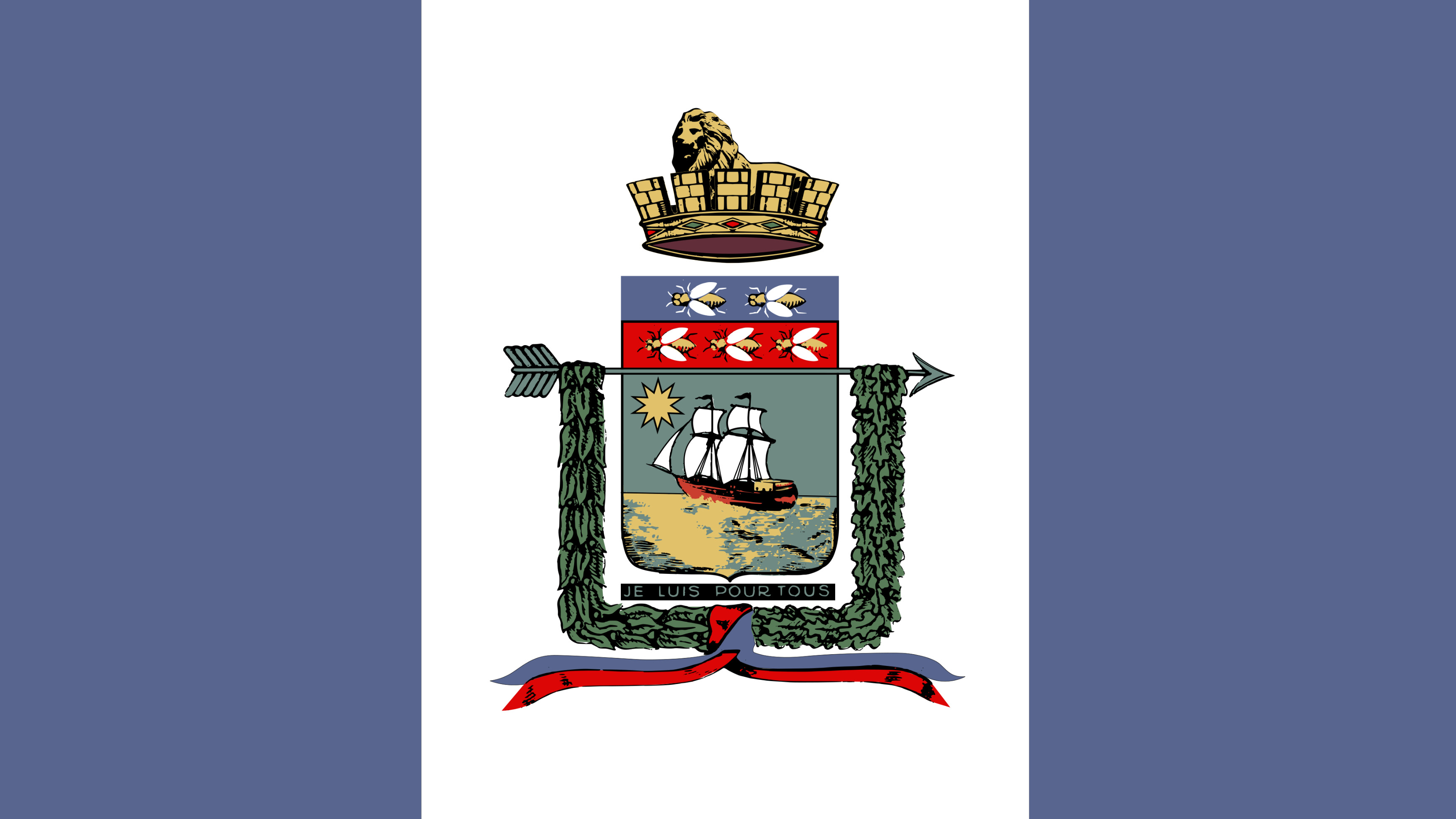
- Flag Coat of arms
- Nicknames: L’Hôpital "The Hospital"
- Motto: Je luis pour tous "I shine for all"
- Location within Haiti Location within the Caribbean Location within North America
- Coordinates: 18°32′11″N 72°20′47″W
- Country: Haiti
- Department: Ouest
- Région: Gônave-Azuei
- Arrondissement: Capitale-Nationale
- Founded: 1749
- Colonial seat (Saint-Domingue): 1770
- Capital of Haiti: 1804
- Founder: Charles Burnier, Marquis of Larnage
- Named for: "Le Prince" Ship

Government
  - Mayor: Lucsonne Janvier

Area
  - Capital city and commune: 36.04 km^{2} (13.92 sq mi)
  - Metro: 158.50 km^{2} (61.20 sq mi)
- Elevation: 6 m (20 ft)

Population (2022 est.)
  - Capital city and commune: 1,200,000
  - Rank: 23rd in North America; 1st in Haiti
  - Density: 27,395/km^{2} (70,950/sq mi)
  - Urban: 2,914,190
  - Metro (2026): 3,133,000; 2nd in the Caribbean
  - Metro density: 16,523/km^{2} (42,790/sq mi)
- Demonym(s): Port-au-Princien(s) (masc.), Port-au-Princienne(s) (fem.) (en) and (fr)
- Time zone: UTC-05:00 (EST)
  - Summer (DST): UTC-04:00 (EDT)
- Postal code: HT6110
- Area code: 21
- HDI (2023): 0.637 medium · 1st
- Website: www.portauprince.ht

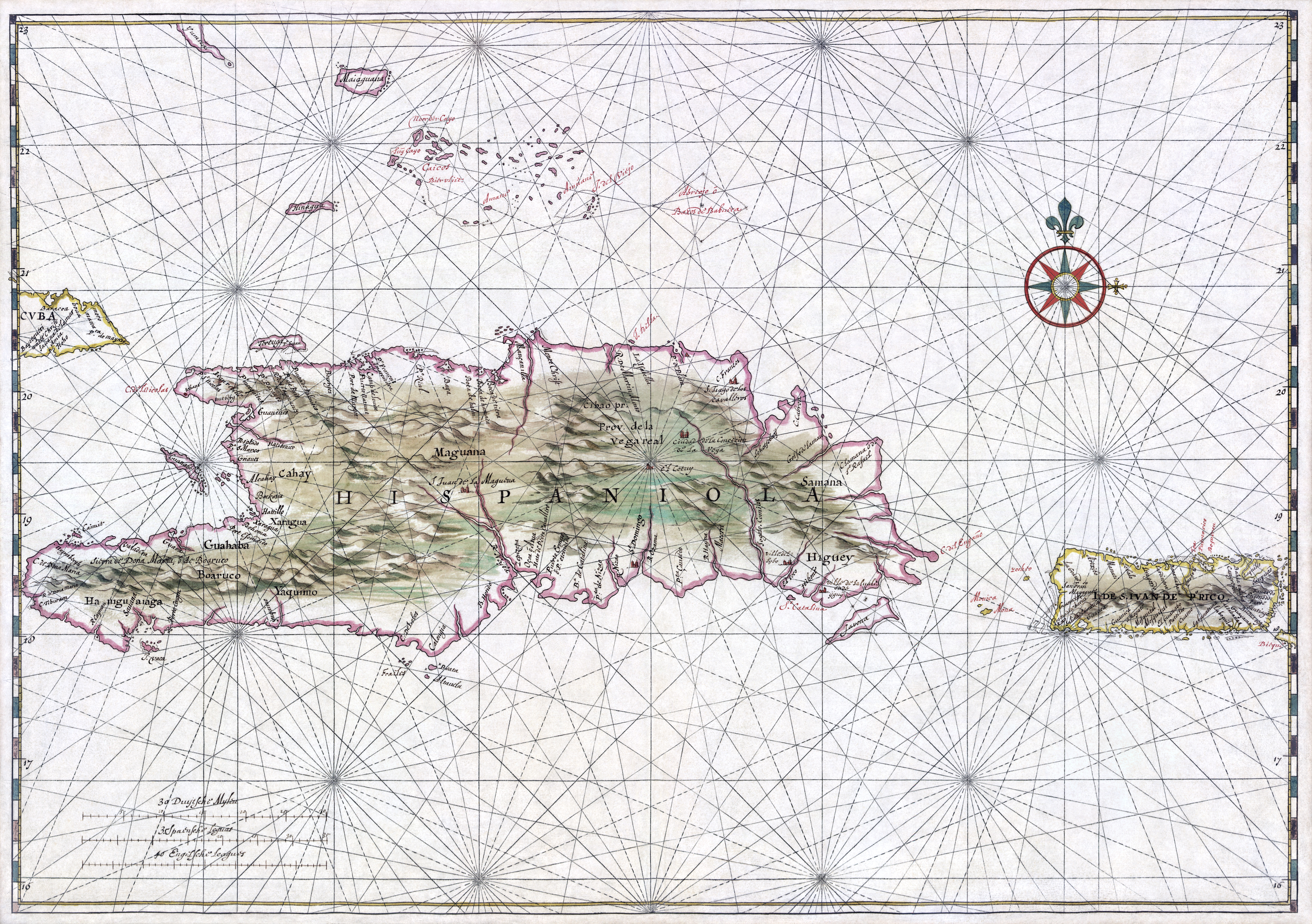
Map of Hispaniola and Puerto Rico, c. 1639

Port-au-Prince (/ˌpɔːrt oʊ ˈprɪns/ PORT oh PRINSS; French: [pɔʁ o pʁɛ̃s]; Haitian Creole: Pòtoprens, [pɔtopɣɛ̃s]) is the capital and most populous city of Haiti. The city's population was estimated at 1,200,000 in 2022 with the metropolitan area estimated at a population of 2,618,894. The metropolitan area is defined by the IHSI as including the communes of Port-au-Prince, Delmas, Cité Soleil, Tabarre, Carrefour, and Pétion-Ville.

The city of Port-au-Prince is on the Gulf of Gonâve: the bay on which the city lies, which acts as a natural harbor, has sustained economic activity since the civilizations of the Taíno. It was first incorporated under French colonial rule in 1749. The city's layout is similar to that of an amphitheater; commercial districts are near the water, while residential neighborhoods are located on the hills above. Its population is difficult to ascertain due to the rapid growth of slums in the hillsides above the city; however, recent estimates place the metropolitan area's population at around 3.7 million, nearly a third of the country's national population. The city was catastrophically affected by a massive earthquake in 2010, with large numbers of structures damaged or destroyed. Haiti's government estimated the death toll to be 230,000. Since 2020, Port-au-Prince has been paralyzed by extensive gang violence; kidnappings, massacres, and gang rapes are common occurrences, often with the complicity of police officers and politicians.

== Etymology ==
Port-au-Prince translates as "Prince's Port", but it is unclear which prince was being honored. A theory is that the place is named after Le Prince, a ship captained by de Saint-André which arrived in the area in 1706. However, the islets in the bay had already been known as les îlets du Prince as early as 1680, predating the ship's arrival. Furthermore, the port and the surrounding region continued to be known as Hôpital, named after the filibusters' hospital.

French colonial commissioner Étienne Polverel named the city Port-Républicain on 23 September 1793 "in order that the inhabitants be kept continually in mind of the obligations which the French Revolution imposed on them". It was later renamed back to Port-au-Prince by Jacques I, Emperor of Haiti.

When Haiti was divided between a kingdom in the north and a republic in the south, Port-au-Prince was the capital of the republic, under the leadership of Alexandre Pétion. Henri Christophe renamed the city Port-aux-Crimes after the assassination of Jacques I at Pont Larnage (now known as Pont-Rouge, and located north of the city).

== History ==
=== Taíno period ===
The Port-au-Prince area was part of the Xaragua chiefdom with the capital city, Yaguana being in Léoganes. There were multiple Taino settlements in the area such as Bohoma and Guahaba. It is understood that most of the plain area was used as hunting grounds. The Bahoruco mountain range in the north-east of Port-au-Prince was the scene of a Taino rebellion led by Enriquillo resulting in a treaty with the Spanish.

=== Spanish colonization ===
Prior to the arrival of Christopher Columbus, the island of Hispaniola was inhabited by the Taíno people, who arrived in approximately 2600 BC in large dugout canoes. They are believed to come primarily from what is now eastern Venezuela. By the time Columbus arrived in 1492 AD, the region was under the control of Bohechio, the Taíno cacique (chief) of Xaragua. He, like his predecessors, feared settling too close to the coast; such settlements would have proven to be tempting targets for the Caribs, who lived on neighboring islands. Instead, the region served as a hunting ground. The population of the region was approximately 400,000 at the time, but the Taínos were gone within 30 years of the arrival of the Spaniards.

With the arrival of the Spaniards, the Amerindians were forced to accept a protectorate, and Bohechio, childless at death, was succeeded by his sister, Anacaona, wife of the cacique Caonabo. The Spanish insisted on larger tributes. Eventually, the Spanish colonial administration decided to rule directly, and in 1503, Nicolas Ovando, then governor, set about to put an end to the régime headed by Anacaona. He invited her and other tribal leaders to a feast, and when the Amerindians had drunk a good deal of wine (the Spaniards did not drink on that occasion), he ordered most of the guests killed. Anacaona was spared, only to be hanged publicly some time later. Through violence, introduced diseases and murders, the Spanish settlers decimated the native population.

Direct Spanish rule over the area having been established, Ovando founded a settlement not far from the coast (west of Etang Saumâtre), ironically named Santa Maria de la Paz Verdadera, which would be abandoned several years later. Not long thereafter, Ovando founded Santa Maria del Puerto. The latter was first burned by French explorers in 1535, then again in 1592 by the English. These assaults proved to be too much for the Spanish colonial administration, and in 1606, it decided to abandon the region.

=== Domination of the filibustiers ===
For more than 50 years, the area that is today Port-au-Prince saw its population drop off drastically, when some buccaneers began to use it as a base, and Dutch merchants began to frequent it in search of leather, as game was abundant there. Around 1650, French flibustiers, running out of room on the Île de la Tortue, began to arrive on the coast, and established a colony at Trou-Borded. As the colony grew, they set up a hospital not far from the coast, on the Turgeau heights. This led to the region being known as Hôpital.

Although there had been no real Spanish presence in Hôpital for well over 50 years, Spain retained its formal claim to the territory, and the growing presence of the French filibustiers on ostensibly Spanish lands provoked the Spanish crown to dispatch Castilian soldiers to Hôpital to retake it. The mission proved to be a disaster for the Spanish, as they were outnumbered and outgunned, and in 1697, the Spanish government signed the Treaty of Ryswick, renouncing any claims to Hôpital. Around this time, the French also established bases at Ester (part of Petite Rivière) and Gonaïves Haiti is bordered to the east by the Dominican Republic, which covers the rest of Hispaniola, to the south and west by the Caribbean, and to the north by the Atlantic Ocean. Cuba lies some 50 miles (80 km) west of Haiti's northern peninsula, across the Windward Passage, a strait connecting the Atlantic to the Caribbean. Jamaica is some 120 miles (190 km) west of the southern peninsula, across the Jamaica Channel, and Great Inagua Island (of The Bahamas) lies roughly 70 miles (110 km) to the north. Haiti claims sovereignty over Navassa (Navase) Island, an uninhabited U.S.-administered islet about 35 miles (55 km) to the west in the Jamaica Channel.

Ester was a rich village, inhabited by merchants, and equipped with straight streets; it was here that the governor lived. On the other hand, the surrounding region, Petite-Rivière, was quite poor. Following a great fire in 1711, Ester was abandoned. Yet the French presence in the region continued to grow, and soon afterward, a new city was founded to the south, Léogâne.

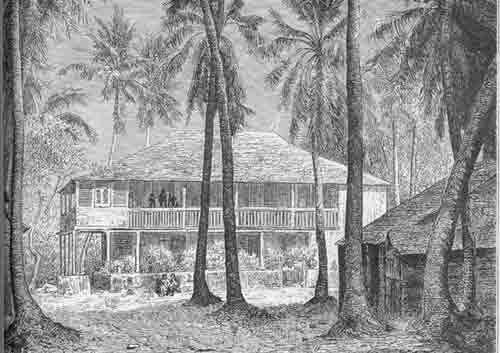
Colonial mansion in Port-au-Prince, 18th century

While the first French presence in Hôpital, the region later to contain Port-au-Prince was that of the flibustiers; as the region became a real French colony, the colonial administration began to worry about the continual presence of these pirates. While useful in repelling foreign pirates, they were relatively independent, unresponsive to orders from the colonial administration, and a potential threat to it. Therefore, in the winter of 1707, Choiseul-Beaupré, the governor of the region sought to get rid of what he saw as a threat. He insisted upon control of the hospital, but the flibustiers refused, considering that humiliating. They proceeded to close the hospital rather than cede control of it to the governor, and many of them became habitans (farmers) the first long-term European inhabitants in the region.

Although the elimination of the flibustiers as a group from Hôpital reinforced the authority of the colonial administration, it also made the region a more attractive target for marauding buccaneers. In order to protect the area, in 1706, a captain named de Saint-André sailed into the bay just below the hospital, in a ship named Le Prince. It is said that M. de Saint-André named the area Port-au-Prince (meaning "Port of the Prince"), but the port and the surrounding region continued to be known as Hôpital (the islets in the bay had already been known as les îlets du Prince as early as 1680).

Pirates eventually refrained from troubling the area, and various nobles sought land grants from the French crown in Hôpital; the first noble to control Hôpital was Sieur Joseph Randot. Upon his death in 1737, Sieur Pierre Morel gained control over part of the region, with Gatien Bretton des Chapelles acquiring another portion of it.

By then, the colonial administration was convinced that a capital needed to be chosen, in order to better control the French portion of Hispaniola (Saint-Domingue). For a time, Petit-Goâve and Léogâne vied for this honor, but both were eventually ruled out for various reasons. Neither was centrally located. Petit-Goâve's climate caused it to be too malarial, and Léogane's topography made it difficult to defend. Thus, in 1749, a new city was built, Port-au-Prince The Place du Champ-de-Mars—the site of a number of historically notable structures in the centre of the city—was hit hard by the 2010 earthquake. The National Palace (rebuilt in 1918) collapsed. Other notable landmarks include the Cathedral of Notre Dame and the adjacent colonial cathedral, both of which also collapsed in the 2010 earthquake, and the National Archives, National Library, and National Museum.

=== Foundation of Port-au-Prince ===
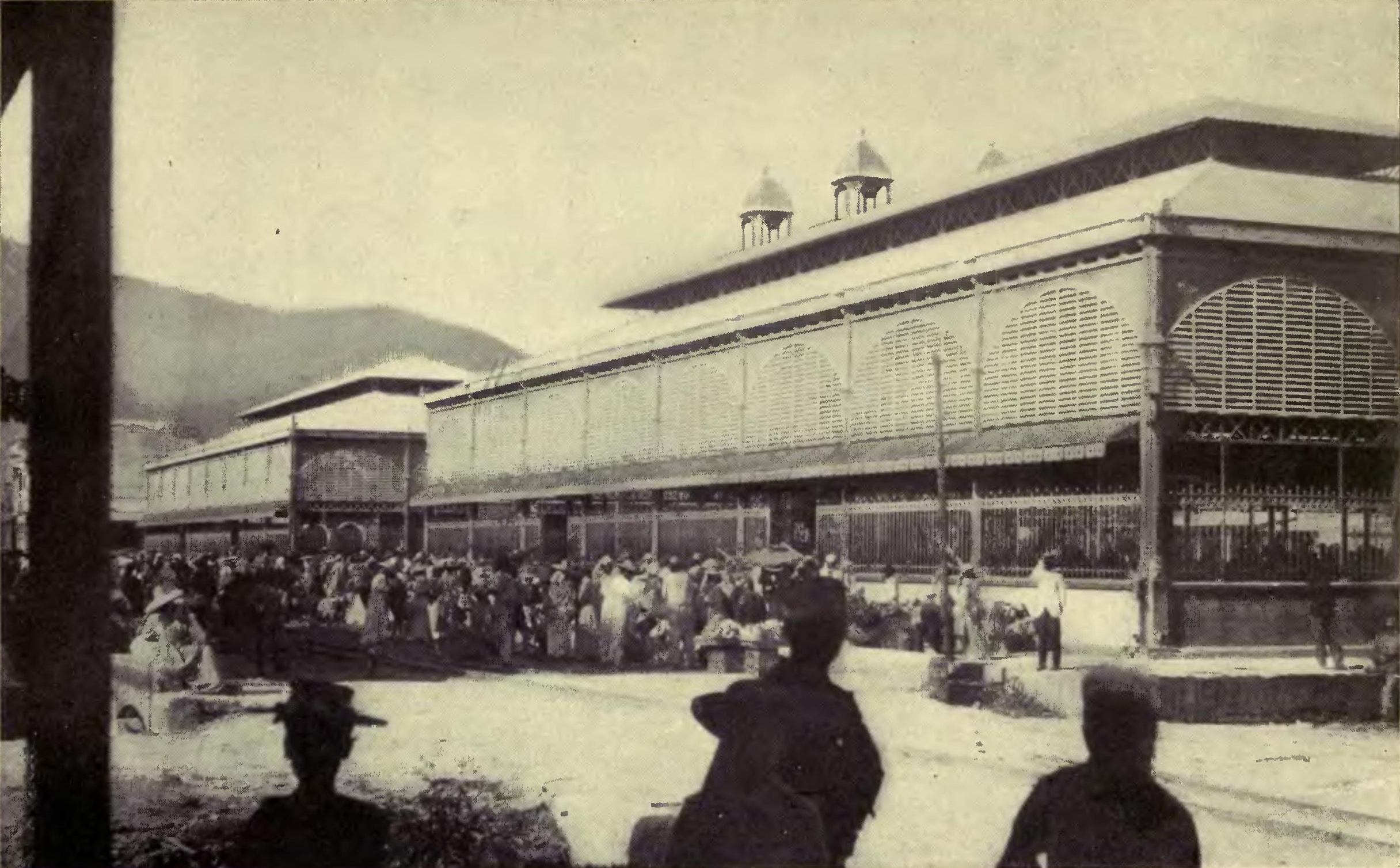
Central Market, Port-au-Prince, 1907

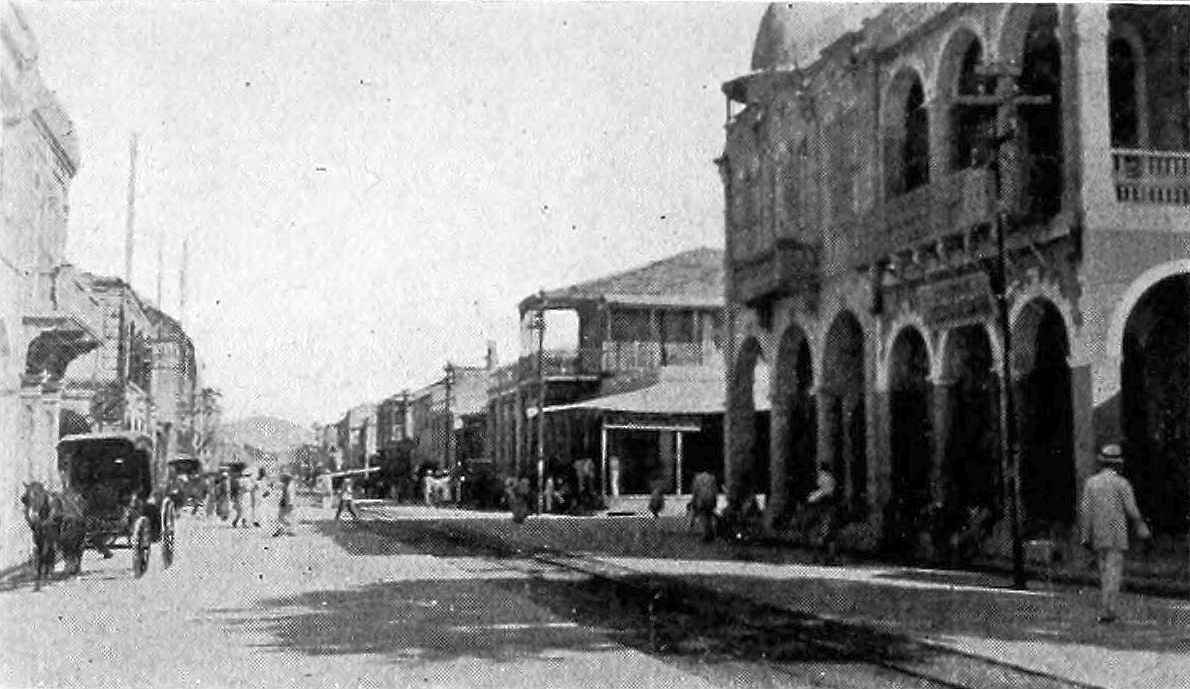
Port-au-Prince, 1920

In 1770, Port-au-Prince replaced Cap-Français (the modern Cap-Haïtien) as capital of the colony of Saint-Domingue.

In November 1791, it was burned in a battle between attacking black revolutionaries and defending white plantation owners.

It was captured by British troops on 4 June 1794, after the Battle of Port-Républicain.

In 1804, it became the capital of newly independent Haïti. When Jean-Jacques Dessalines was assassinated in 1806, Port-au-Prince became the capital of the mulatto-dominated south (Cap-Haïtien was the capital of the black-dominated north). It was re-established as the capital of all of Haiti when the country was unified again in 1820. Port-au-Prince was the centre of the political and intellectual life of the country and is the seat of the State University of Haiti (established in 1920). A traditionally picturesque site has been the brash and bustling Iron Market, with its mostly female vendors. Recreation for the privileged centres around European-style social clubs, but the house of the local voodoo priest is still the heart of the urban poor community.

Most of the Haitian elite (nearly all mulatto or nonblacks) live in the suburb of Pétionville in the 1,000–1,500-foot- (300–450-metre-) high hills southeast of Port-au-Prince. Haiti's small but politically important Black middle class is also concentrated around Port-au-Prince. Squalor and neglect surround most of the Black urban working class even more than it does the subsistence farmer, and constant migration from the countryside continues to exacerbate their misery. Slums such as Cité Soleil are among the largest and most deprived in the Americas. Pop. (2009 est.) city, 875,978; metropolitan area, 2,296,386.

=== American occupation ===
During the American occupation of Haiti (1915–1934), Port-au-Prince, garrisoned by American Marines and Haitian gendarmes, was attacked twice by caco rebels. The first battle, which took place in 1919, was a victory of the American and Haitian government forces, as was the second attack in 1920.

=== 2010 earthquake ===
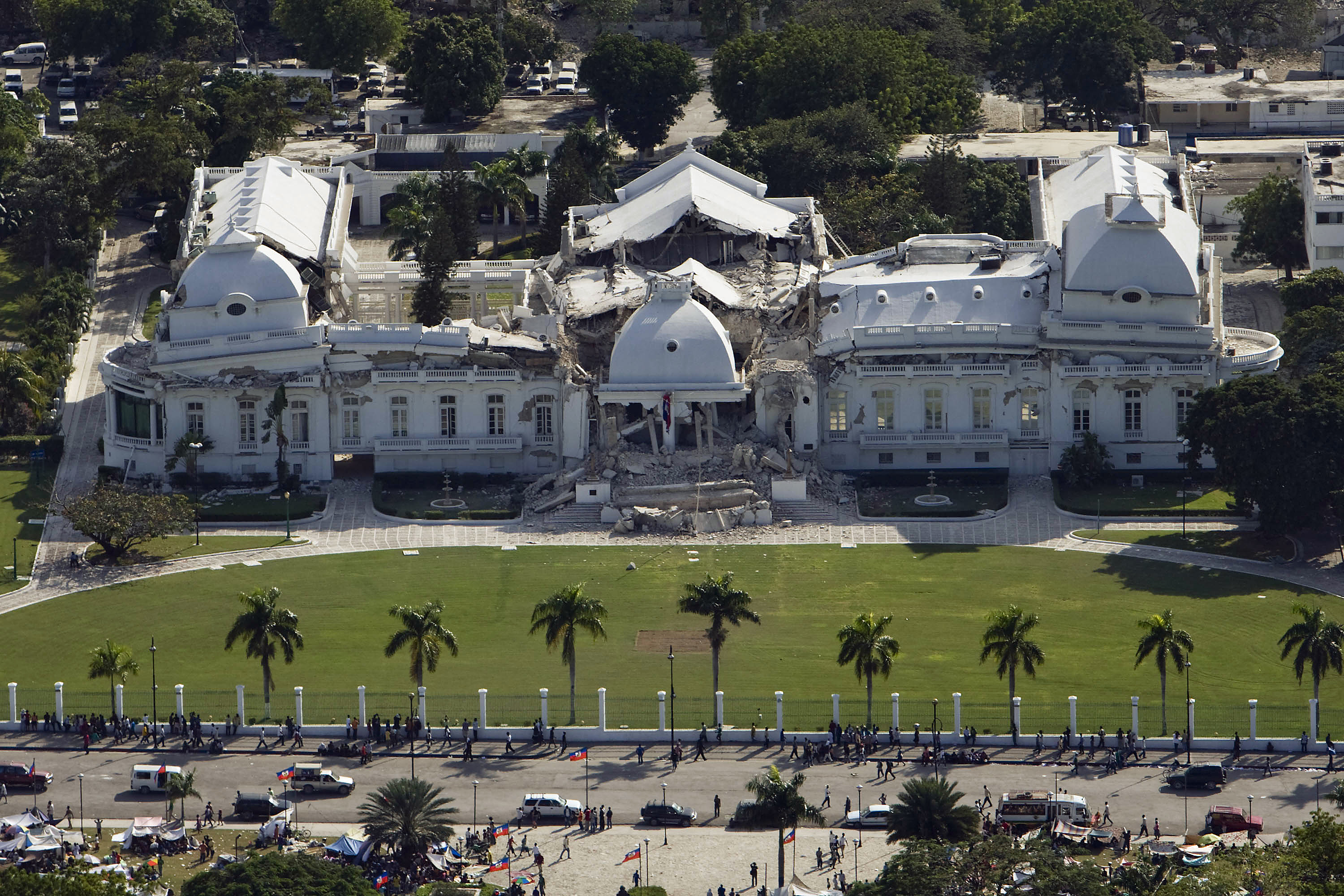
The Presidential Palace (National Palace) on 13 January 2010, the day after the 2010 earthquake, showing the extensive damage to the edifice.

Heavily damaged areas of the city

On 12 January 2010, a 7.0 earthquake struck Port-au-Prince, devastating the city. Most of the central historic area of the city was destroyed, including Haiti's prized Cathédrale de Port-au-Prince, the capital building, Legislative Palace (the parliament building), Palace of Justice (Supreme Court building), several ministerial buildings, and at least one hospital. The second floor of the Presidential Palace was thrown into the first floor, and the domes skewed at a severe tilt. The seaport and airport were both damaged, limiting aid shipments. The seaport was severely damaged by the quake and was unable to accept aid shipments for the first week.

The airport's control tower was damaged and the US military had to set up a new control center with generators to prepare the airport for aid flights. Aid was delivered to Port-au-Prince by numerous nations and voluntary groups as part of a global relief effort. On Wednesday 20 January 2010, an aftershock rated at a magnitude of 5.9 caused additional damage. The City Hall (Mairie de Port-au-Prince) and most of the city's other government municipal buildings were destroyed in the 2010 earthquake. Ralph Youri Chevry was the mayor of the city at the time of the earthquake.

=== Hurricanes ===
The worst hurricane season experienced by Haiti occurred in 2008 when four storms Fay, Gustav, Hanna, and Ike negatively impacted Haiti. Nearly 800 people were killed; 22,000 homes were destroyed; 70% of the country's crops were lost, according to reliefweb.org. Then, in 2012, Hurricane Sandy, while not making direct impact, resulted in 75 deaths, $250 million in damage and a resurgence of cholera that was estimated to have infected 5,000 people. In 2016, Hurricane Matthew caused catastrophic damage across Haiti, and over 500 deaths were associated with the storm in Haiti alone, along with at least $3 billion in damage. The storm also caused a massive humanitarian crisis shortly after.

== Geography ==
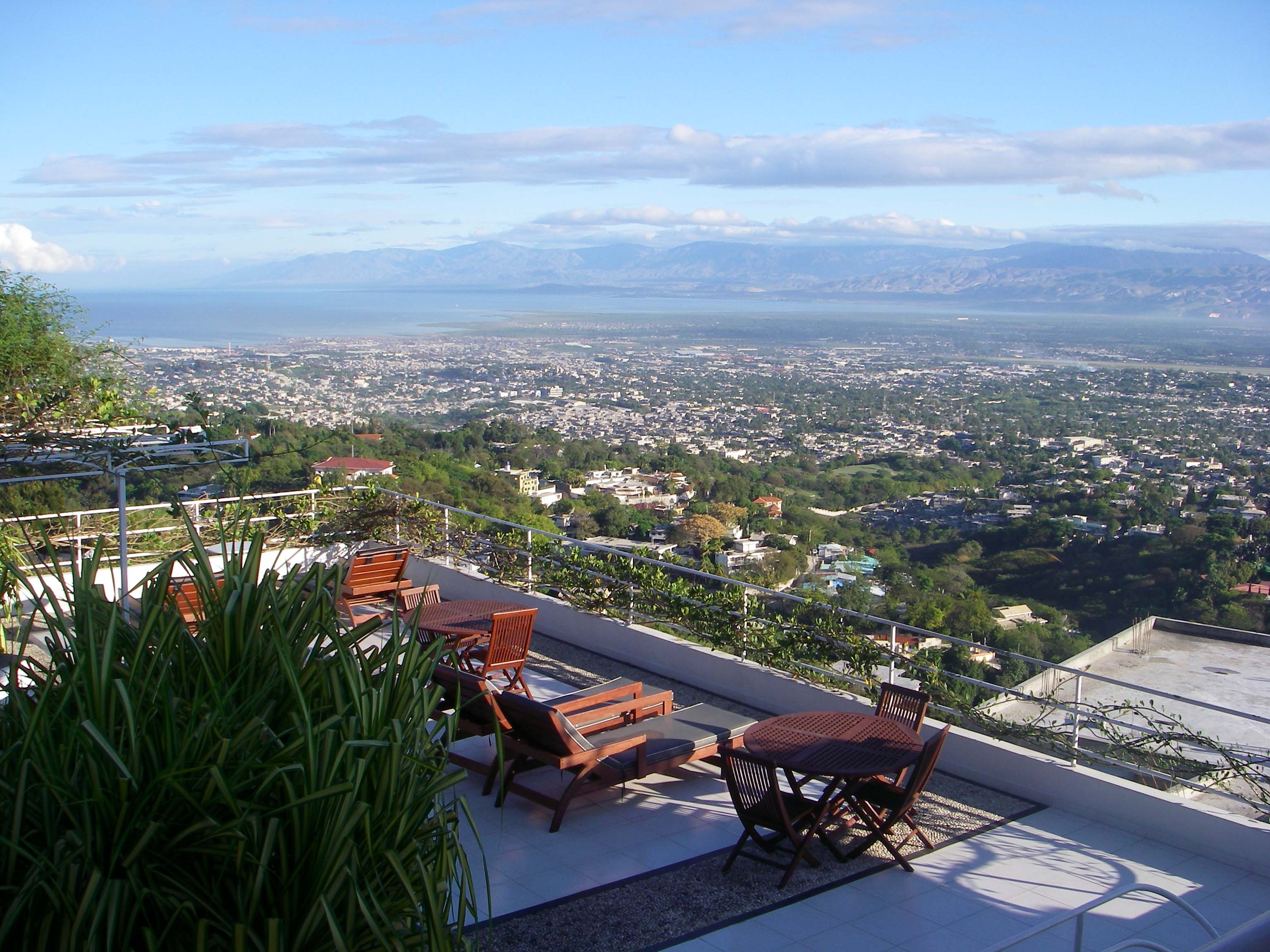
City and bay views from the terrace of the Hôtel Montana in Pétion-Ville

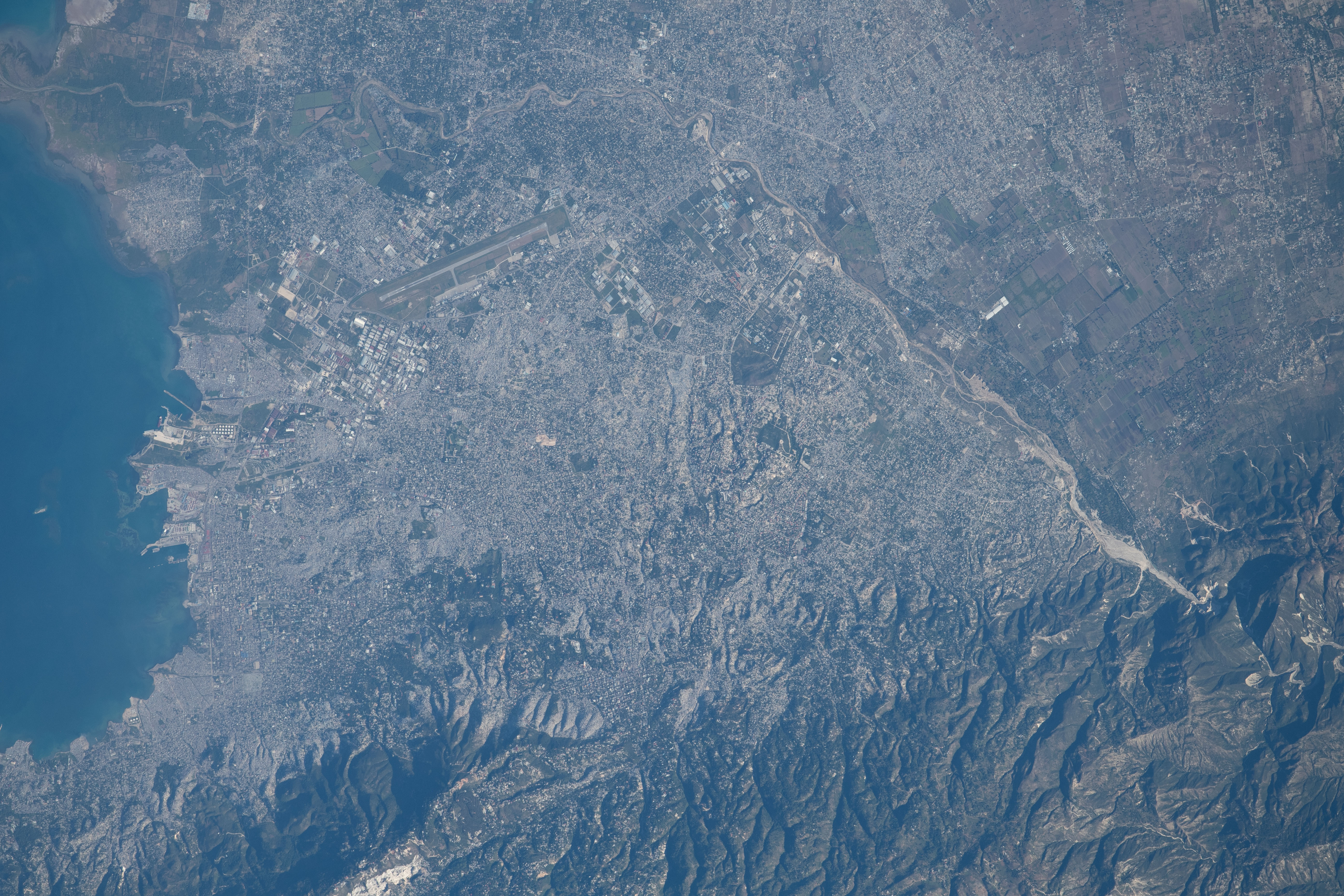
Aerial view of Port-au-Prince by NASA

The metropolitan area is subdivided into various communes (districts). There is a ring of districts that radiates out from the commune of Port-au-Prince. Pétion-Ville is an affluent suburban commune located southeast of the city. Delmas is located directly south of the airport and north of the central city, and the rather poor commune of Carrefour is located southwest of the city.

The commune harbors many low-income slums plagued with poverty and violence in which the most notorious, Cité Soleil, is situated. However, Cité Soleil has been recently split off from Port-au-Prince proper to form a separate commune. The Champ de Mars area has begun some modern infrastructure development as of recently. The downtown area is the site of several projected modernization efforts in the capital.

=== Climate ===
Port-au-Prince has a tropical savanna climate (Köppen Aw) and relatively constant temperatures throughout the course of the year. Port-au-Prince's wet season runs from March through November with rainfall peaking from April to May and from August to October, with the city experiencing a relative break in rainfall during the months of June and July. The city's dry season covers the remaining three months. Port-au-Prince generally experiences warm and humid conditions during the dry season and hot and humid conditions during the wet season.

Climate data for Port-au-Prince (1991-2020)
Month	Jan	Feb	Mar	Apr	May	Jun	Jul	Aug	Sep	Oct	Nov	Dec	Year
Mean daily maximum °C (°F)	30.6 (87.1)	30.8 (87.4)	31.7 (89.1)	32.2 (90.0)	32.8 (91.0)	33.9 (93.0)	34.4 (93.9)	34.2 (93.6)	33.3 (91.9)	32.5 (90.5)	31.7 (89.1)	31.1 (88.0)	32.4 (90.4)
Daily mean °C (°F)	25.6 (78.1)	25.8 (78.4)	26.4 (79.5)	26.9 (80.4)	27.5 (81.5)	28.3 (82.9)	28.9 (84.0)	28.6 (83.5)	28.1 (82.6)	27.5 (81.5)	26.9 (80.4)	26.1 (79.0)	27.2 (81.0)
Mean daily minimum °C (°F)	20.6 (69.1)	20.8 (69.4)	21.1 (70.0)	21.7 (71.1)	22.2 (72.0)	22.8 (73.0)	23.3 (73.9)	23.1 (73.6)	22.8 (73.0)	22.5 (72.5)	22.2 (72.0)	21.1 (70.0)	22.0 (71.6)
Average rainfall mm (inches)	25 (1.0)	33 (1.3)	58 (2.3)	121 (4.8)	214 (8.4)	111 (4.4)	122 (4.8)	155 (6.1)	188 (7.4)	165 (6.5)	71 (2.8)	32 (1.3)	1,295 (51.1)
Average rainy days (≥ 1 mm)	3.1	3.5	4.8	8.2	13.4	9.1	9.5	12.1	14.2	13.1	7.6	4.4	103
Average relative humidity (%)	74	71	72	77	80	78	77	79	82	84	82	78	78
Average dew point °C (°F)	20 (68)	20 (68)	20 (68)	21 (70)	22 (72)	22 (72)	23 (73)	23 (73)	23 (73)	23 (73)	22 (72)	21 (70)	22 (71)
Mean monthly sunshine hours	279.0	254.2	279.0	273.0	251.1	237.0	279.0	282.1	246.0	251.1	240.0	244.9	3,116.4
Average ultraviolet index	7	8	11	13	14	14	14	14	13	12	9	7	11
Source 1: Climate & Temperature
Source 2: Climate-Data

== Demographics ==
The population of the area was 1,234,742. The majority of the population is of African descent, but a prominent biracial minority controls many of the city's businesses. There are sizable numbers of Asian residents, as well as a number of Europeans (both foreign-born and native-born).

Citizens of Arab (particularly Syrian, Lebanese, and Palestinian) ancestry have a large presence in the capital. Arab Haitians (a large number of whom live in Port-au-Prince) are, more often than not, concentrated in financial areas where the majority of them establish businesses. Most of the biracial residents of the city are concentrated within wealthier areas.

== Notable people ==
- Arsène Auguste (1951–1993), footballer
- Jean-Claude Bajeux (1931–2011), human rights activist
- Charles-Henri Baker (born 1955), industrialist
- Édouard-Gérard Balbiani (1823–1899), French embryologist, was born in Port-au-Prince
- Jean-Pierre Boyer (1776–1850), president
- Samuel Dalembert (born 1981), basketball player
- Louis Delmas (born 1987), professional American football player
- Pierre Desir (born 1990), professional American football player
- Marie-Jeanne Lamartinière (fl. 1802), revolutionary and nurse
- Jean Pascal (born 1982), boxer
- Paulette Poujol-Oriol (1926–2011), educator and actress
- Michel-Rolph Trouillot (1949–2012), academic and anthropologist
- Toby Anbakè (born 1990), rapper and singer

== Economy ==
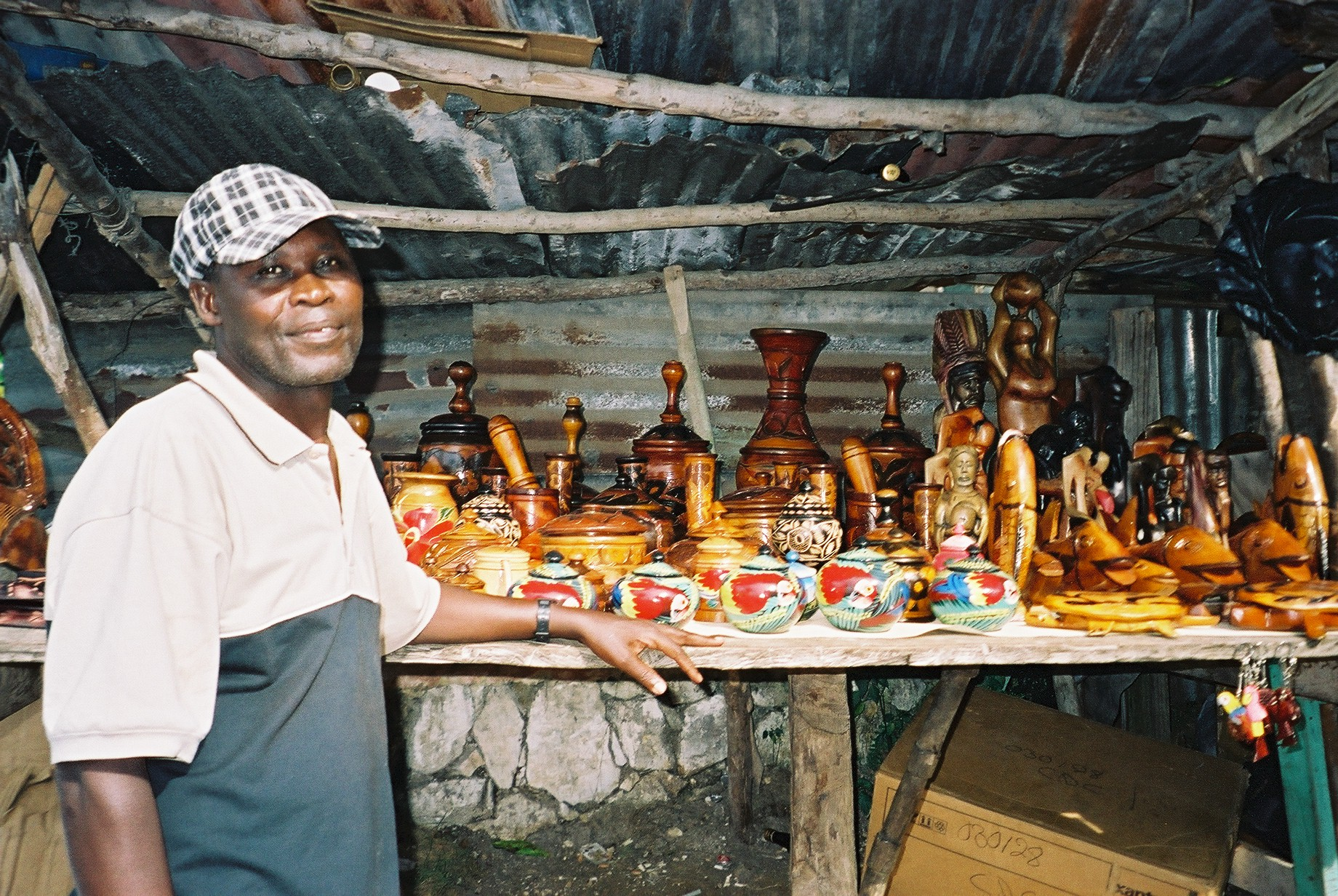
Artisan in Port-au-Prince

Port-au-Prince is one of the nation's largest centers of economy and finance. The capital exports its most widely consumed produce of coffee and sugar, and has, in the past, exported other goods, such as shoes and baseballs. Port-au-Prince has food-processing plants as well as soap, textile and cement factories. Despite political unrest, the city also relies on the tourism industry and construction companies to move its economy. Port-au-Prince was once a popular place for cruises, but has lost nearly all of its tourism, and no longer has cruise ships coming into port.

Unemployment in Port-au-Prince is high, and compounded further by underemployment. Levels of economic activity remain prominent throughout the city, especially among people selling goods and services on the streets. Informal employment is believed to be widespread in Port-au-Prince's slums, as otherwise the population could not survive. Port-au-Prince has several upscale districts in which crime rates are significantly lower than in the city center.

Port-au-Prince has a tourism industry. The Toussaint Louverture International Airport (referred to often as the Port-au-Prince International Airport) is the country's main international gateway for tourists. Tourists often visit the Pétion-Ville area of Port-au-Prince, with other sites of interest including gingerbread houses.

== Health ==
There are a number of hospitals including le Centre Hospitalier du Sacré-Cœur, Hôpital de l'Université d'État d'Haïti (l'HUEH), Centre Obstetrico Gynécologique Isaïe Jeanty-Léon Audain, Hôpital du Canapé-Vert, Hôpital Français (Asile Français), Hôpital Saint-François de Sales, Hôpital-Maternité Sapiens, Hôpital OFATMA, Clinique de la Santé, Maternité de Christ Roi, Centre Hospitalier Rue Berne and Maternité Mathieu.

After the 2010 earthquake, two hospitals remained that were operational. The University of Miami in partnership with Project Medishare has created a new hospital, L'Hôpital Bernard Mevs Project Medishare, to provide inpatient and outpatient care for those impacted by the January 2010 earthquake. This hospital is volunteer staffed and provides level 1 trauma care to Port-au-Prince and the surrounding regions.

CDTI (Centre de Diagnostique et de Traitement Intégré) closed in April 2010 when international aid failed to materialize. It had been considered the country's premiere hospital.

== Culture ==
The culture of the city lies primarily in the center around the National Palace as well as its surrounding areas. The National Museum is located in the grounds of the palace, established in 1938. The National Palace was one of the early structures of the city but was destroyed and then rebuilt in 1918. It was destroyed again by the earthquake on 12 January 2010 which collapsed the center's domed roof.

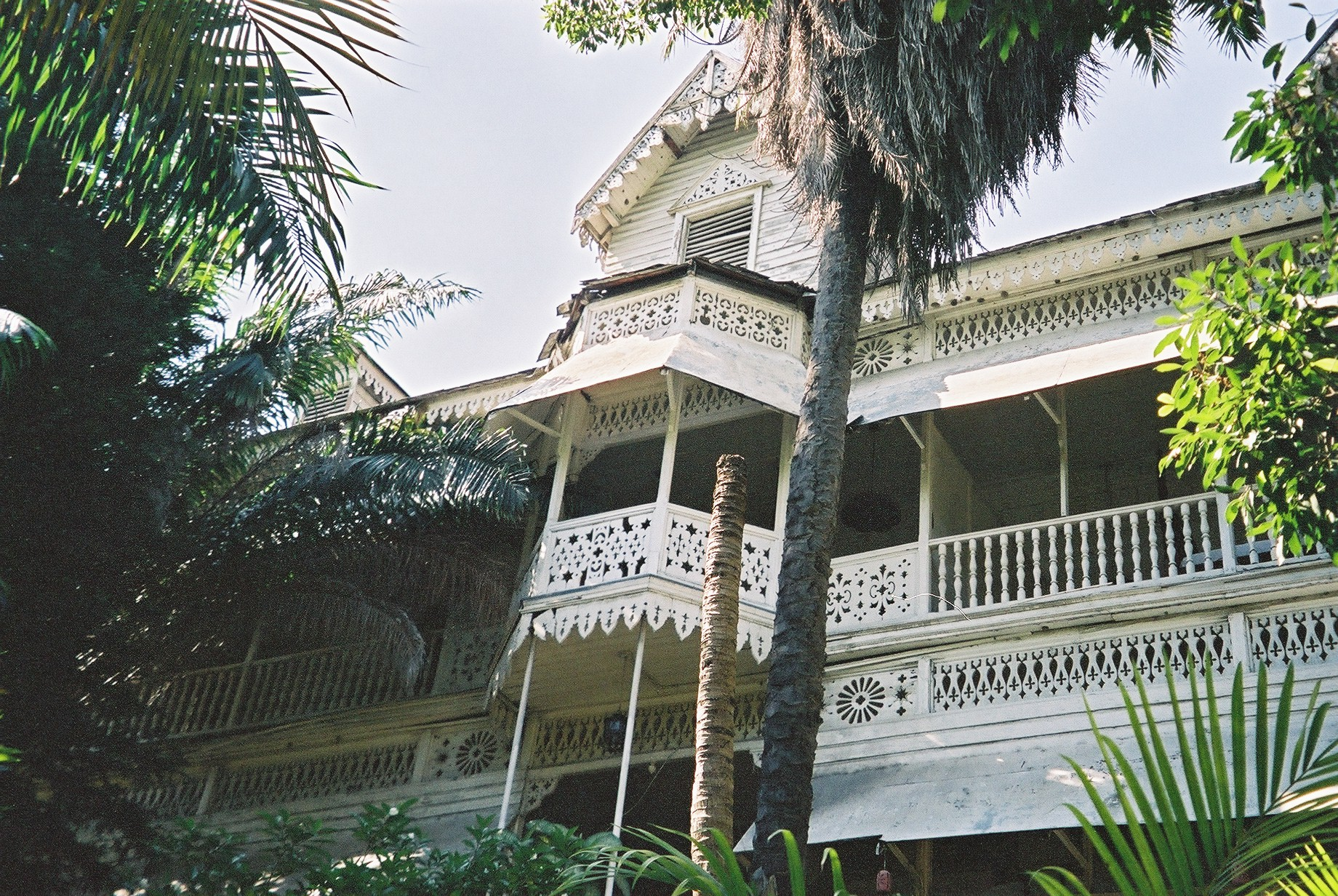
Hotel Oloffson

Another popular destination in the capital was the Hotel Oloffson, a 19th-century gingerbread mansion which was once the private home of two former Haitian presidents. It became a popular hub for tourist activity in the central city before falling victim to arson in 2025. The Cathédrale de Port-au-Prince, which was ruined in the 2010 earthquake, was a prominent tourist attraction for its architecture and significance to Haitian history.

The Musée d'Art Haïtien du Collège Saint-Pierre contains work from some of the country's most talented artists, and the Musée National is a museum featuring historical artifacts such as King Henri Christophe's actual suicide pistol and a rusty anchor that museum operators claim was salvaged from Christopher Columbus's ship, the Santa María. Other notable cultural sites include the Archives Nationales, the Bibliothèque Nationale (National Library) and Expressions Art Gallery. The city is the birthplace of internationally known naïve artist Gesner Abelard, who was associated with the Centre d'Art. The Musée du Panthéon National Haïtien (MUPANAH) is a museum featuring the heroes of the independence of Haiti, the Haitian history and culture.

On 5 April 2015, the construction of a new LDS Temple in Port-au-Prince was announced.

Port-au-Prince is the only city anywhere in the world to have a main avenue named for American abolitionist hero John Brown. Another is named for another abolitionist hero, Massachusetts Senator Charles Sumner.

=== Celebrations ===
There is a celebration of Bawon Samdi and Gran Brigi called Fet Gede, which takes place from the Day of the Dead on 1 November through the third day of the month. This occurs in the national cemetery of Haiti. While celebrating, people wear Vodou white cotton clothing and purple headscarves. During the celebration, the cemetery becomes packed with people. Those who are celebrating make sacrifices of food for the spirits (mange lwa) and pour liquor on the gravestones among other festivities.

== Government ==
The mayor of Port-au-Prince is Lucsonne Janvier, who succeeded Ralph Youri Chevry in July 2020. In 2023, Janvier's City Hall employees protested lack of salaries.

The city's separate districts (primarily the districts of Delmas, Carrefour, and Pétion-Ville) are all administered by their own municipal councils. The seat of the state, the Presidential Palace, is located in the Champ de Mars, square plaza of the city. The PNdH (Police Nationale d’Haïti) is the authority governing the enforcement of city laws.

The national police force as of recently, have been increasing in number. However, because of its ailing ineffectiveness and insufficient manpower, a significant number of UN personnel is present throughout the city as part of the stabilization mission in Haiti.

== Education ==
Port-au-Prince various educational institutions, ranging from small vocational schools to universities. Influential international schools in Port-au-Prince include Union School, founded in 1919, and Quisqueya Christian School, founded in 1974. Both schools offer an American-style pre-college education. French-speaking students can attend the Lycée Français (Lycée Alexandre Dumas), located in Bourdon. Another school is Anís Zunúzí Bahá'í School, northwest of Port-au-Prince; it opened its doors in 1980 and survived the 2010 Haiti earthquake. Its staff cooperated in relief efforts and sharing space and support with neighbors.

A clinic was run at the school by a medical team from the United States and Canada. Its classes offered transition from Haitian Creole to the French language but also a secondary language in English. The State University of Haiti (Université d'État d'Haïti in French, or UEH), is located within the capital, along other universities such as the Quisqueya University and the Université des Caraïbes. There are many other institutions that observe the Haitian curriculum. Many of them are religious academies led by foreign missionaries from France or Canada, and they include Institution Saint-Louis de Gonzague, École Sainte-Rose-de-Lima, École Saint-Jean-Marie Vianney, Institution du Sacré-Coeur, and Collège Anne-Marie Javouhey.

The Ministry of Education is also located in downtown Port-au-Prince at the Palace of Ministries, adjacent to the National Palace in the Champ de Mars plaza.

The Haitian Group of Research and Pedagogical Activities (GHRAP) has set up several community centers for basic education. UNESCO's office in Port-au-Prince has taken a number of initiates in upgrading the city's educational facilities.

== Crime ==
A 2012 independent study found that the murder rate in Port-au-Prince was 60.9 murders per 100,000 residents in February 2012. In the 22 months after the end of the President Aristide era in 2004, the murder rate for Port-au-Prince reached a high of 219 murders per 100,000 residents per year.

High-crime zones in the Port-au-Prince area include Croix-des-Bouquets, Cité Soleil, Carrefour, Bel Air, Martissant, the port road (Boulevard La Saline), urban route Nationale 1, the airport road (Boulevard Toussaint-Louverture) and its adjoining connectors to the New ("American") Road via Route Nationale 1. This latter area in particular has been the scene of numerous robberies, carjackings, and murders.

In the Bel Air neighborhood of Port-au-Prince, the murder rate reached 50 murders per 100,000 residents at the end of 2011, up from 19 murders per 100,000 residents in 2010.

== Transportation ==
=== Roads ===
All of the major transportation systems in Haiti are located near or run through the capital. The northern highway, Route Nationale #1 (National Highway One), originates in Port-au-Prince. The southern highway, Route Nationale #2, also runs through Port-au-Prince. Maintenance for these roads lapsed after the 1991 coup, prompting the World Bank to lend US$50 million designated for road repairs. The project was canceled in January 1999, however, after auditors revealed corruption. A third major highway, the Route Nationale #3, was built in successive sections up to the late 2010s, receiving support from the European Union. It connects Port-au-Prince to the central plateau and Cap-Haïtien. As of 2020, this highway was described as highly used, but also as a focal point of armed robberies.

=== Public transportation ===
While two state-run bus companies operate in the city, the most common and significant form of public transportation are "tap-taps." These are privately owned, independent services that use pickup trucks as share taxis throughout Port-au-Prince. Usually brightly painted and converted to seat 10 or more passengers, tap taps operate on fixed or semi-fixed routes with flexible schedules. It was estimated that 13,000 tap-taps were in use in 2011, though the number is likely higher.

=== Seaport ===
The seaport, Port international de Port-au-Prince, has more registered shipping than any of the over dozen ports in the country. The port's facilities include cranes, large berths, and warehouses, but these facilities are in universally poor shape. The port is underused, possibly due to the substantially high port fees compared to ports in the Dominican Republic.

=== Airports ===
Toussaint Louverture International Airport (Maïs Gâté), which opened in 1965 (as François Duvalier International Airport), is north of the city. It is Haiti's major jetway, and as such, handles the vast majority of the country's international flights. Transportation to smaller cities from the major airport is done via smaller aircraft. Companies providing this service include Caribintair and Sunrise Airways.

== See also ==
- List of metropolitan areas in the Caribbean
- Enriquillo-Plantain Garden fault zone
- Famous people from Port-au-Prince
- Port au Prince – a ship from the Age of Sail

== Bibliography ==
- Kolbe, Athena R.; Muggah, Robert (2012). ""Haiti's Urban Crime Wave? Results from Monthly Household Surveys August 2011 – February 2012" (PDF). Rio de Janeiro: Instituto Igarape. Kolbe, Athena R & Muggah, Robert. p. 9.
