= Haitian French =

Variety of French spoken in Haiti

- français haïtien
- Native to: Haiti, United States, Canada, Costa Rica
- Ethnicity: Haitians, French Haitians
- Native speakers: 4,454,000 (2016)
- Language family: Indo-European: Italic; Romance; Western; Gallo-Romance; Oïl; French; Kreyòl; African French; Haitian French
- Writing system: Latin (French alphabet); French Braille

Language codes
- ISO 639-3: –
- Glottolog: None
- Linguasphere: 51-AAA-ija
- IETF: fr-HT

Haitian French (French: français haïtien [fʁɑ̃sɛ aisjɛ̃]; Haitian Creole: fransè ayisyen) is the variety of French spoken in Haiti. Haitian French is close to standard French. It should be distinguished from Haitian Creole, which is not mutually intelligible with French.

== Phonology ==
The phoneme consonant /ʁ/ is pronounced [ɣ], but it is often silent in the syllable coda when occurring before a consonant or prosodic break (faire is pronounced [fɛː]). The nasal vowels are not pronounced as in Metropolitan French: /ɑ̃/ → [ã], /ɛ̃/ → [ɛ̃], /ɔ̃/ → [õ], and /œ̃/ → [œ̃]. The typical vowel shifts make it sound very much like other regional accents of the French Caribbean and the Francophone countries of Africa. The perceivable difference between Haitian French and the French spoken in Paris lies in the Haitian speaker's intonation, where a subtle creole-based tone carrying the French on top is found. Importantly, these differences are not enough to create a misunderstanding between a native Parisian speaker and a speaker of Haitian French.

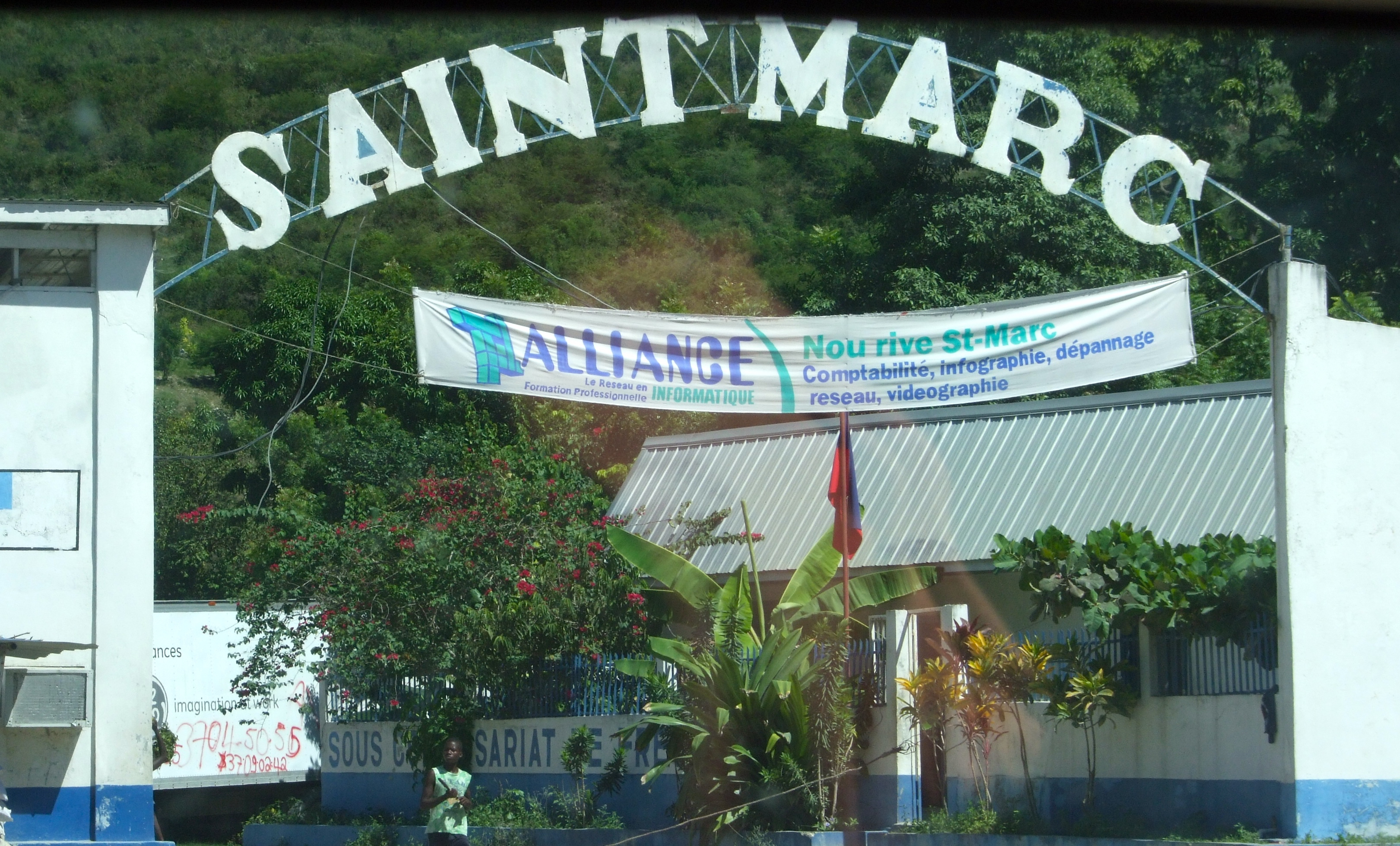
French signs in Saint-Marc; it also incorporates the Creole phrase nou rive, "we have arrived."

In Haiti, the French spoken in Paris is very prestigious, so much so that a growing number of Haitians would rather speak it as precisely as possible and pursue this by listening to Radio France Internationale and matching the somewhat conservative style of speech heard on that station.

In the educated groups, French is spoken more closely to the Parisian accent. It is within this group that a major portion of enrollment is provided for the private schools and universities. Even in this group however, a native accent of the language usually occurs in everyone's speech.

== See also ==
- Canadian French
- Louisiana French
- Saint-Barthélemy French
- Varieties of French
- French language in the United States
