= List of airports in Haiti =

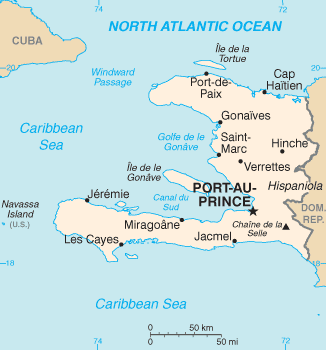
Map of Haiti

This is a list of airports in Haiti, grouped by type and sorted by location.

Haiti, officially the Republic of Haiti, is a Caribbean country. It occupies the western, smaller portion of the island of Hispaniola, which it shares with the Dominican Republic. The total area of Haiti is 27,750 square kilometres (10,714 sq mi). Its capital is Port-au-Prince. The official languages are French and Haitian Creole.

Haiti is divided into ten departments, which are further divided into 42 arrondissements, and 145 communes and 571 communal sections.

== Airports ==
Airport names shown in bold indicate the airport has scheduled service on commercial airlines.

City served	Department	ICAO	IATA	Airport name	Coordinates	Runway
**International**
Cap-Haïtien	Nord	MTCH	CAP	**Cap-Haïtien International Airport**	19°43′59″N 72°11′41″W	7,500 ft × 131 ft (2,286 m × 40 m) paved
Port-au-Prince	Ouest	MTPP	PAP	**Toussaint Louverture International Airport**	18°34′48″N 072°17′33″W	9,974 ft × 141 ft (3,040 m × 43 m) paved
**Domestic**
Hinche	Centre		HIN	Hinche Airport	19°8′21.076″N 72°0′52.774″W	2,660 ft (810 m) unpaved
Jacmel	Sud-Est	MTJA	JAK	Jacmel Airport	18°14′28″N 072°31′07″W	3,937 ft × 95 ft (1,200 m × 29 m) paved
Jérémie	Grand'Anse	MTJE	JEE	**Jérémie Airport**	18°39′48″N 74°10′20″W	3,937 ft (1,200 m) paved
Les Cayes	Sud	MTCA	CYA	**Antoine-Simon Airport**	18°16′16″N 73°47′18″W	3,666 ft × 80 ft (1,117 m × 24 m) paved
Port-de-Paix	Nord-Ouest	MTPX	PAX	Port-de-Paix Airport	19°56′05″N 72°50′50″W	2,100 ft (640 m) unpaved
**Other**
Anse-à-Galets	Ouest			Anse-à-Galets Airport (on Île de la Gonâve)	18°50′28.89″N 72°52′51.2″W	2,448 ft (746 m) unpaved
Anse-Rouge	Artibonite			Anse-Rouge Airport	19°39′57.246″N 73°4′19.124″W	1,936 ft (590 m) unpaved
Belladère	Centre			Belladère Airport	18°51′11.731″N 71°49′6.467″W	3,300 ft (1,000 m) unpaved
Dame-Marie	Grand'Anse			Dame-Marie Airport	18°36′59.783″N 74°25′0.897″W	3,280 feet (1,000 m) grass
Fond-des-Blancs	Sud			Fond-des-Blancs Airport	18°17′9.969″N 73°6′42.067″W	2,100 ft (640 m)unpaved
Môle-Saint-Nicolas	Nord-Ouest			Môle-Saint-Nicolas Airport	19°50′4.02″N 73°21′28.962″W	3,150 ft (960 m) unpaved
Ouanaminthe	Nord-Est			Ouanaminthe Airport	19°32′14.237″N 71°43′42.989″W	2,424 ft (739 m) unpaved
Phaeton	Nord-Est			Phaeton Airport	19°19′18.452″N 72°7′8.596″W	3,238 ft (987 m) unpaved
Pignon	Nord			Pignon Airport	19°19′18.452″N 72°7′8.596″W	3,500 ft (1,100 m) unpaved
Port-Salut	Sud			Port-Salut Airport	18°3′58.23″N 73°54′35.035″W	2,628 ft (801 m) unpaved
**Closed**
~~Port-au-Prince~~	~~Ouest~~			~~Aéroport de Chancerelles~~		

=== Airports by volume of traffic ===
1. Toussaint Louverture International Airport Port-au-Prince
2. Cap-Haïtien International Airport Cap-Haïtien
3. Port-de-Paix Airport Port-de-Paix
4. Antoine-Simon Airport Les Cayes
5. Jérémie Airport Jérémie

== Makeshift airstrips ==
In the wake of the 7.0 magnitude 2010 Haiti earthquake of January 12, several makeshift airports have been set up around the country to facilitate aid shipments.

Outside of Léogâne, a makeshift airstrip has been set up on part of Route 9, a highway of the commune, able to handle small planes.

== See also ==
- Transport in Haiti
- List of airports by ICAO code: M#MT - Haiti
- Wikipedia: WikiProject Aviation/Airline destination lists: North America#Haiti
