= Tortug' Air =

Haitian flag-carrier airline

Tortug’Air
IATA	ICAO	Call sign
—	—	TORTUG AIR
- Founded: 2003
- Ceased operations: 2015
- Hubs: Toussaint Louverture International Airport
- Fleet size: 3
- Destinations: 8
- Headquarters: Port-au-Prince, Haiti
- Key people: Olivier Jean (President)
- Website: TortugAir.com

Tortug'Air S.A. was a domestic airline in Haiti, and served as Haiti's national flag carrier. The airline was founded in March 2003, and was based in Port-au-Prince. According to the airline, more than 200 people were employed with the company. Tortug' Air went out of business sometime between mid-March to August, 2015.

Tortug’Air was part of Haiti's transportation infrastructure. Despite the country's small size, the road network is in poor condition. Thus, air transportation takes on an oversized importance for Haiti. Tortug’ Air served that need with its domestic schedule. For example, its 40 minute flight from Port-au-Prince to Jacmel could have been driven instead; but it would take approximately four hours by road.

== History ==
Tortug'Air S.A. was founded in January 2003, and launched its commercial flights on 13 August 2004.

In January 2013, Tortug'Air officially applied for permission to fly in the USA. Haiti being a Category 2 of the International Aviation Safety Assessment Program (IASA), its airlines were not permitted to fly US skies, but a wet lease with a Category 1 operator (South African carrier CemAir) made the request feasible. Tortug'Air first US flights to Fort Lauderdale International Airport started in June 2014.

== Destinations ==
Tortug’ Air served six Haitian and three international destinations. It also had charter permits for most Caribbean islands. Flights to Les Cayes were suspended in early 2012.

Country (State/Provence/Island)	City	Airport	Date started	Refs
Haiti	Port-au-Prince	Toussaint L'Ouverture International Airport		
Haiti	Jacmel	Jacmel Airport		
Haiti	Jérémie	Jérémie Airport		
Haiti	Cap-Haïtien	Cap-Haitien International Airport		
Haiti	Port-de-Paix	Port-de-Paix Airport		
Dominican Republic (Distrito Nacional)	Santo Domingo	La Isabela International Airport		
Bahamas (New Providence)	Nassau	Lynden Pindling International Airport		
Turks and Caicos (Providenciales)	—	Providenciales International Airport		
United States	Broward County, Florida	Fort Lauderdale International Airport	June 2014	

== Fleet ==
Tortug' Air Fleet
Aircraft	In service	On order	Passengers	Notes
JetStream 31	2	—	19	
Let L-410 Turbolet	1	—	17	
Total	3	—		

== See also ==
- List of defunct airlines of Haiti
- List of airlines of Haiti
