= List of defunct airlines of Haiti =

This is a list of defunct airlines of Haiti.

| Airline | Image | IATA | ICAO | Callsign | Commenced operations | Ceased operations | Notes |
|---|---|---|---|---|---|---|---|
| Adeah Cargo | | | HJA | | 2001 | 2006 | Air Haiti merged into Adeah Cargo |
| Air d'Ayiti | | H87 | HAD | HAITI AVIA | 1997 | 2003 | |
| Air Haïti | | HJ | HJA | Air Haiti | 1969 | 1982 | Merged into Adeah Cargo |
| Air Metro North | | DZ | | | 1992 | 1994 | |
| Caribintair | | | CRT | CARIBINTAIR | 1989 | 2007 | Owned by Caribair. |
| Compagnie Haitienne de Transports Aeriens (COHATA) | | | | | 1961 | 1974 | Created as Corps d’Aviation de 1’Armee d’Haiti, a unit of Haiti Air Corps in 1942 to provide mail (1943) and passenger (1944) transport. |
| Haiti Air Inter | | HL | | | 1973 | 1984 | |
| Haïti Air | | | HAB | | 1985 | 1986 | |
| Haïti Air Freight | | 9F | HLS | | 1977 | 1999 | |
| Haïti Ambassador Airlines | | 2T | HAM | | 2003 | 2006 | Founded in 2002 as private airline. |
| Haiti Aviation | | H5 | | | 2013 | 2013 | |
| Haïti Trans Air | | TV | HTC | Haïti Trans Air | 1986 | 1995 | |
| Halisa Air | | WD | HBC | Halisa | 1991 | 1998 | |
| Hanair Airline | | 8F | HNR | | 1992 | 1993 | |
| Pearl Airways | | HP | HPA | PEARL AIRWAYS | | | |
| Salsa d'Haïti | | SO | SLC | SALSA | 2009 | 2013 | |
| Tortug' Air | | | | TORTUG AIR | 2003 | 2015 | |
| Tropical Airways | | M7 | TBG | | 2001 | 2006 | |
| Vision Air Haiti | | | TBG | | 2009 | | |

== See also ==
- List of airlines of Haiti
- List of airports in Haiti
