= Jérémie Airport =

Airport in Haiti

Jérémie Airport Ayewopò Jeremi
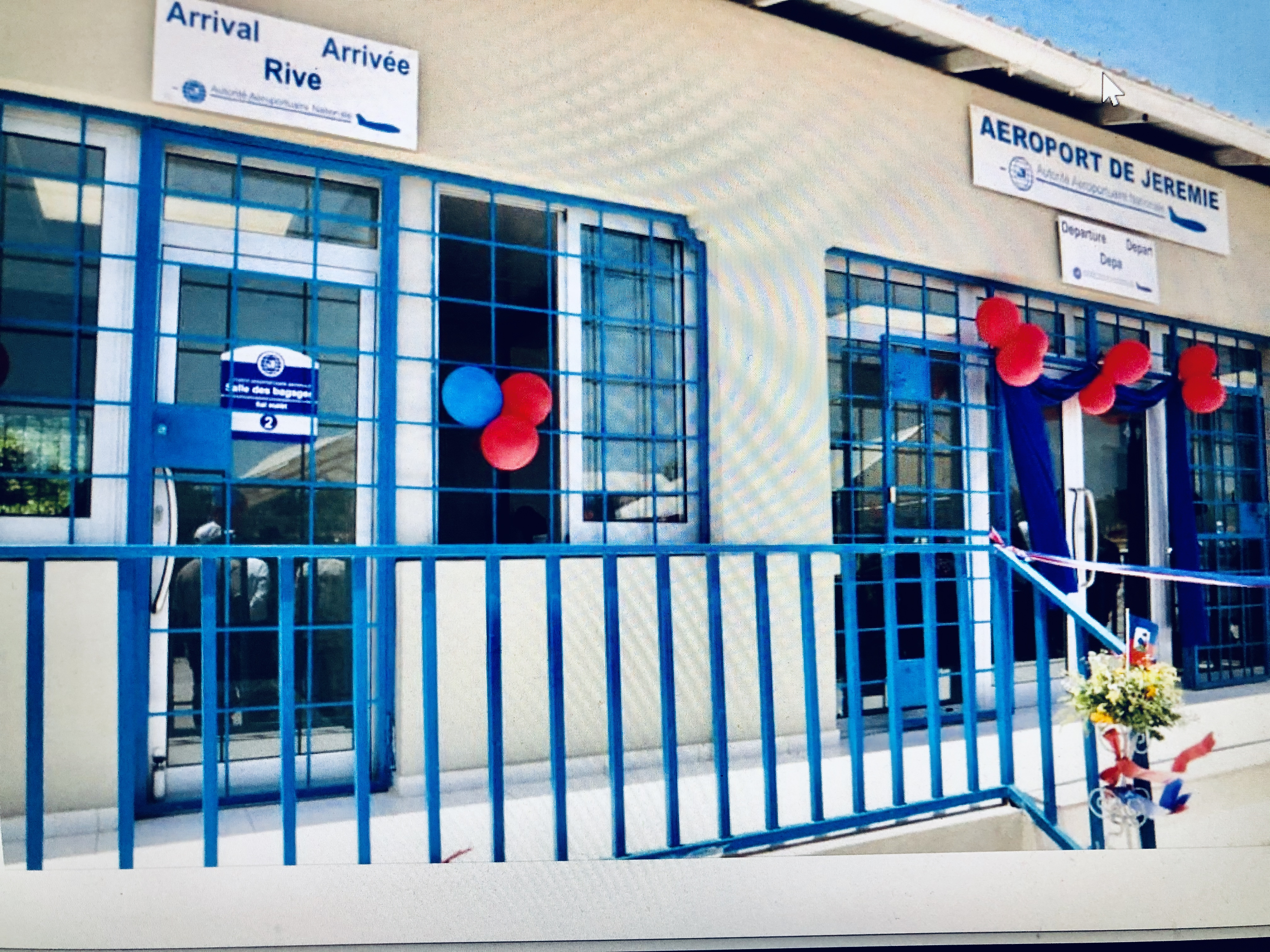
- IATA: JEE; ICAO: MTJE

Summary
- Airport type: Public
- Operator: Autorité Aéroportuaire Nationale
- Elevation AMSL: 147 ft (45 m)
- Coordinates: 18°39′48″N 74°10′20″W
- Website: aan.gouv.ht

Map
- Location of airport in Haiti

Runways
Direction	Length		Surface
Direction	m	ft	Surface
10/28	1,200	3,937	Asphalt
- Sources: Great Circle Mapper Google Maps

Jérémie Airport (IATA: JEE, ICAO: MTJE) is 6.5 kilometres (4.0 mi) west of Jérémie in the Grand'Anse (department) of Haiti and is the fifth busiest airport in Haiti in terms of passenger traffic. The Jérémie non-directional beacon (Ident: JRM) is located on the field.

== History ==
Jérémie airport was renovated in 2020 to allow for bigger planes to land. The arrival and departure terminals were also renovated. There are talks of expanding the runway to be big enough to allow international flights to land directly in Jérémie. Such a change would allow for international flights to land directly to the Southern part of Haiti, bypassing the busy Capital.

== Airlines and destinations ==
The following airlines operate regular scheduled and charter services at the airport:

Airlines	Destinations
Sunrise Airways	Cap-Haïtien, Port-au-Prince

== See also ==
- Transport in Haiti
- List of airports in Haiti
