= Hinche (disambiguation) =

Hinche is a commune in Haiti. It may also refer to:

- Hinche Arrondissement, Haiti
- Diocese of Hinche, Haiti
- Hinche Airport, Haiti
- Hinche Parham Mabry (1829–1884), American lawyer, state legislator, judge and Confederate colonel in the Civil War

== See also ==
- Hinch (disambiguation)
