= Phaeton Airport =

Airport in Phaeton, Nord-Est, Haiti

Fort Liberte Airport Ayewopò Fayeton
- IATA: none; ICAO: none

Summary
- Airport type: Public
- Operator: Autorité Aéroportuaire Nationale
- Serves: Fort-Liberte, Haiti
- Location: Phaeton, Nord-Est
- Elevation AMSL: 35 ft / 11 m
- Coordinates: 19°40′50″N 71°54′20″W
- Website: http://www.aanhaiti.com/aan/

Map
- Location in Haiti

Runways
Direction	Length		Surface
Direction	m	ft	Surface
04/22	1,100	3,609	Grass
- Sources: Google Maps

Phaeton Airport is an airport located in Phaeton, a town in the Fort-Liberte area of the Nord-Est Department of Haiti. The airport was built as part of the Dauphin Plantation and is 1 kilometre (0.62 mi) west of the town.

== See also ==
- Transport in Haiti
- List of airports in Haiti
