= Anse-à-Galets Airport =

Airport in Anse à Galets, Haiti

Anse á Galets Airport Ayewopò Ansagalèt
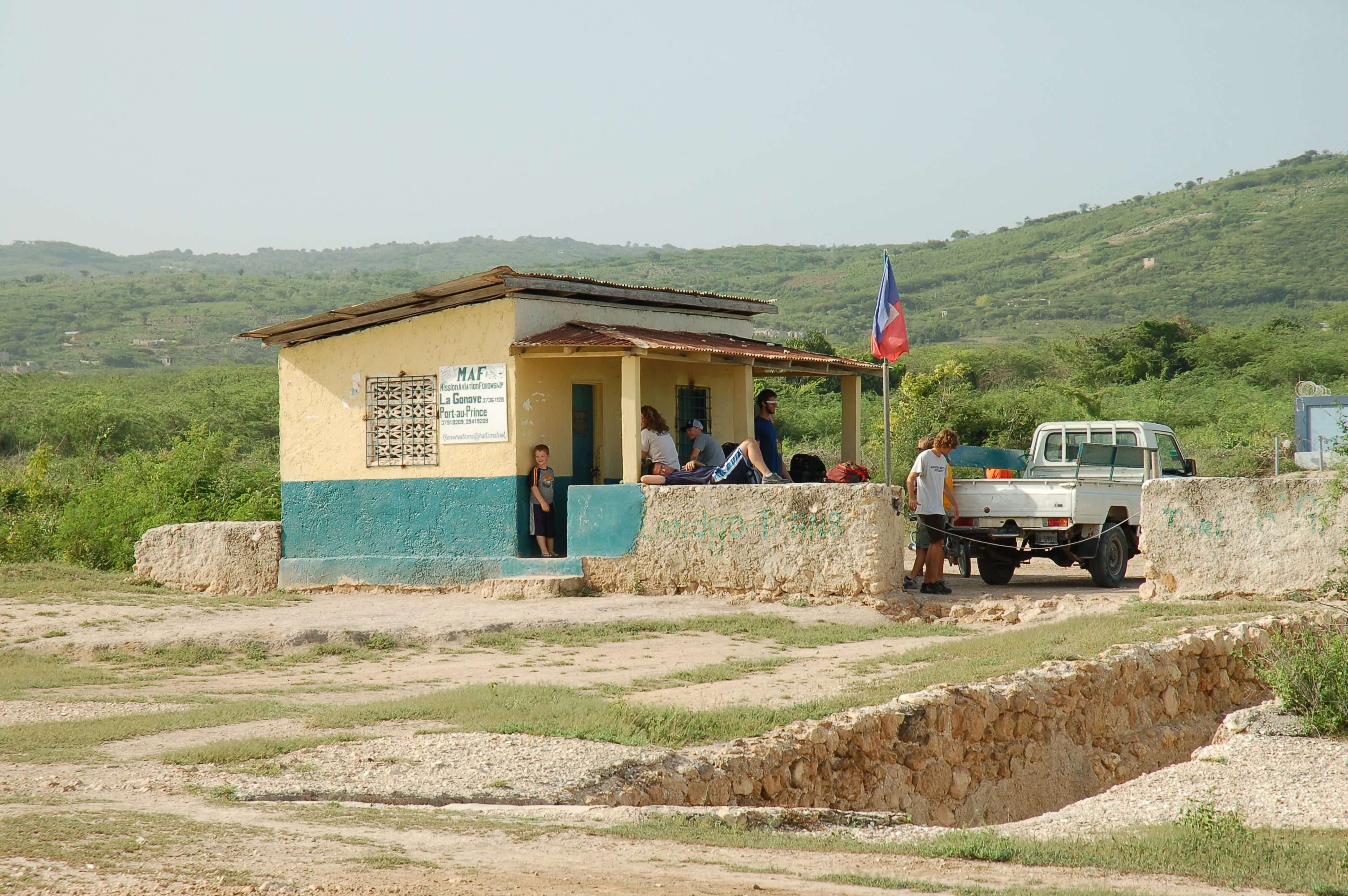
- IATA: none; ICAO: none; LID: HT-0002

Summary
- Airport type: Public
- Operator: Autorité Aéroportuaire Nationale
- Serves: Anse à Galets, Haiti
- Elevation AMSL: 16 ft / 5 m
- Coordinates: 18°50′30″N 72°52′50″W

Map
- Location in Haiti

Runways
Direction	Length		Surface
Direction	m	ft	Surface
12/30	730	2,395	Sand
- Sources: Google Maps OA

Anse-à-Galets Airport is a shoreline airport in Anse-à-Galets, La Gônave, Haiti. This airport is served by charter airlines from Port-au-Prince. Gonâve Island (French: Île de la Gonâve) is an island of Haiti 55 kilometres (34 mi) to the west-northwest of Port-au-Prince in the Gulf of Gonâve.

== See also ==
- Transport in Haiti
- List of airports in Haiti
