= Antoine Simon Airport =

Airport in Haiti

Antoine Simon International Airport Ayewopò Antoine-Simon
- IATA: CYA; ICAO: MTCA

Summary
- Airport type: Public
- Operator: Autorité Aéroportuaire Nationale
- Serves: Les Cayes, Haiti
- Elevation AMSL: 70 m (230 ft)
- Coordinates: 18°16′16″N 73°47′18″W
- Website: http://aan.gouv.ht/

Map
- Location in Haiti

Runways
Direction	Length		Surface
Direction	m	ft	Surface
08/26	1,910	6,266	Asphalt
- Sources: WAD Google Maps GCM

Antoine Simon International Airport (IATA: CYA, ICAO: MTCA) is a commercial international airport in Haiti. It is the fourth largest airport in Haiti for passenger traffic and is 9 kilometres (5.6 mi) north of Les Cayes, a Caribbean coastal city in Haiti's Southern peninsula.

== History ==
The airport is named after François C. Antoine Simon, the 18th President of Haiti (1908–1911). It was financed and built by the Haitian government and inaugurated on 7 May 2005 by then Prime Minister Gérard Latortue. Taiwan financed the construction of the access road to the airport.

On February 1, 2013, Haiti laid the first stone on the expansion of the Antoine-Simon Airport. The Autorité Aéroportuaire Nationale plans to make it an international airport by extending the runway to 3,000 metres (9,800 ft) and adding a terminal with customs and other services. Both runway ends have displaced thresholds. The Cayes non-directional beacon (Ident: CAY) is located 0.4 nautical miles (0.7 km) southeast of the runway.

The project is part of broader efforts to ramp up infrastructure development in Haiti's South department. Haitian officials (Prime Minister Laurent Lamothe and Tourism Minister Stéphanie Villedrouin) suggested that the airport would open up completely the southern region as the country sees tourism as a promising sector capable of creating thousands of jobs in the region. On March 6, 2025, it officially became an international airport as the runway had been expanded and the Haitian government confirmed it was ready to receive international flights.

The expanded airport received its first international flight on November 10, 2025, an IBC Airways flight from Miami.

Another airport is being built on the neighboring island of Île-à-Vache.

== Airlines and destinations ==
Sunrise Airways operate a regular flight three times a week and other charter services at the airport:

Airlines	Destinations
Sunrise Airways	Cap-Haïtien, Port-au-Prince

== See also ==
- Transport in Haiti
- List of airports in Haiti
