= Pignon Airport =

Airport in Haiti

Pignon Airport Ayewopò Piyon
- IATA: none; ICAO: none

Summary
- Airport type: Public
- Operator: Autorité Aéroportuaire Nationale
- Serves: Pignon, Haiti
- Elevation AMSL: 1,148 ft / 350 m
- Coordinates: 19°19′25″N 72°07′00″W
- Website: http://www.aan.gouv.ht/

Map
- Location in Haiti

Runways
Direction	Length		Surface
Direction	m	ft	Surface
06/24	1,200	3,937	Grass
- Sources: Google Maps

Pignon Airport is an airport serving Pignon, a city in the Nord Department of Haiti. The airport has scheduled and charter airline service from Port-au-Prince.

The runway has an additional 200 metres (660 ft) grass overrun on the southwest end. It is 1 kilometre (0.6 mi) south of the city. There is a large hill just to the north of the Pignon.

== History ==
It was financed and built by Dr Guy Theodore.

== Airlines and destinations ==
As of January 2021, there are no scheduled services at the airport.

== See also ==
- Transport in Haiti
- List of airports in Haiti
