= Ouanaminthe Airport =

Airport in Haiti

Ouanaminthe Airport Ayewopò Wanament
- IATA: none; ICAO: none

Summary
- Airport type: Public
- Operator: Autorité Aéroportuaire Nationale
- Serves: Ouanaminthe, Haiti
- Elevation AMSL: 124 ft / 38 m
- Coordinates: 19°32′15″N 71°43′43″W

Map
- Location in Haiti

Runways
Direction	Length		Surface
Direction	m	ft	Surface
01/19	735	2,411	Grass
- Sources: Google Maps

Ouanaminthe Airport is a small airport that serves the city of Ouanaminthe in the Nord-Est department of Haiti, on the border with Dominican Republic.

== See also ==
- Transport in Haiti
- List of airports in Haiti
