= Môle-Saint-Nicolas Airport =

Airport in Haiti

Môle-Saint-Nicolas Airport Ayewopò Mòl Sen Nikola
- IATA: none; ICAO: none

Summary
- Airport type: Public
- Serves: Môle-Saint-Nicolas
- Elevation AMSL: 63 ft / 19 m
- Coordinates: 19°50′05″N 73°21′30″W

Map
- Location of the airport in Haiti

Runways
| Direction | Length | | Surface |
| Direction | m | ft | Surface |
|---|---|---|---|
| 04/22 | 960 | 3,150 | Grass |
- Sources: Google Maps

Môle-Saint-Nicolas Airport is an airstrip 3.52 kilometres (2.19 mi) northeast of Môle-Saint-Nicolas, a commune in the Nord-Ouest Department of Haiti. The runway is at the base of a small 8 kilometres (5.0 mi) peninsula that forms the bay of Môle. There is rising terrain southeast of the airport. The airport temporarily hosted the Haiti Air Corps as a secondary airbase to Bowen Field.

== See also ==
- Transport in Haiti
- List of airports in Haiti
