= Belladère Airport =

Airport in Belladère, Haiti

Belladère Airport Ayewopò Beladè
- IATA: none; ICAO: none; LID: BEL

Summary
- Airport type: Public
- Operator: Autorité Aéroportuaire Nationale
- Location: Belladère
- Coordinates: 18°51′08″N 71°48′59″W

Map
- Location in Haiti

Runways
Direction	Length		Surface
Direction	m	ft	Surface
13/31	590	1,936	Grass
- Sources: Google Maps

Aerodrome de Belladère is an airport that serves Belladère in the Centre department of Haiti. It supports only small aircraft.

Airport may be closed. Satellite imagery shows structures encroaching the eastern end of the runway. See Talk page.

== See also ==
- Transport in Haiti
- List of airports in Haiti
