= Port-de-Paix Airport =

Airport in Haiti

Port-de-Paix Airport Aéroport de Port-de-Paix
- IATA: PAX; ICAO: MTPX

Summary
- Airport type: Public
- Operator: Autorité Aéroportuaire Nationale
- Serves: Port-de-Paix, Haiti
- Elevation AMSL: 9 ft (2.7 m)
- Coordinates: 19°56′05″N 72°50′50″W
- Website: http://www.aan.gouv.ht/

Map
- Location in Haiti

Runways
Direction	Length		Surface
Direction	m	ft	Surface
05/23	640	2,100	Gravel
- Sources: GCM Google Maps

Port-de-Paix Airport (IATA: PAX, ICAO: MTPX) is in passenger numbers, the third airport in Haiti and is located in the city with the same name, Port-de-Paix, on the north coast of Haiti.

The airport does not have radar, nor is it a radio controlled aerodrome. The air traffic control center functions without these. The runway is within the city and is subject to pedestrian traffic. The Port de Paix non-directional beacon (Ident: PPX) is located near the runway.

== See also ==
- Transport in Haiti
- List of airports in Haiti
