= Dame-Marie Airport =

Airport in Haiti

Dame-Marie Airport Ayewopò Dam Mari
- IATA: none; ICAO: none; LID: DMM

Summary
- Airport type: Public
- Serves: Dame-Marie
- Elevation AMSL: 157 ft / 48 m
- Coordinates: 18°37′00″N 74°25′00″W

Map
- Location in Haiti

Runways
Direction	Length		Surface
Direction	m	ft	Surface
09/27	1,000	3,281	Grass
- Sources: Google Maps

Dame-Marie Airport is an airstrip that serves Dame-Marie, a coastal town and commune in the Grand'Anse Department of Haiti. The runway is 6 kilometres (3.7 mi) north of the town.

Mission Aviation Fellowship (MAF) flies into Dame-Marie once a month from Jérémie.

== See also ==
- Transport in Haiti
- List of airports in Haiti
