= Hinche Airport =

Airport in Haiti

Aérodrome d'Hinche
- IATA: none; ICAO: none

Summary
- Airport type: Public
- Operator: Autorité Aéroportuaire Nationale
- Serves: Hinche, Haiti
- Elevation AMSL: 854 ft / 260 m
- Coordinates: 19°08′20″N 72°00′55″W

Map
- Location in Haiti

Runways
Direction	Length		Surface
Direction	m	ft	Surface
07/25	860	2,822	Grass
- Sources: Google Maps

Aérodrome d'Hinche is a small airport that serves Hinche in the Centre department of Haiti. It supports only small aircraft and has some domestic flights.

== See also ==
- Transport in Haiti
- List of airports in Haiti
