= Air d'Ayiti =

Haitian airline (1997–1999)

Haiti Aviation
| IATA | ICAO | Call sign |
|---|---|---|
| H8 | HAD | HAITI AVIA |
- Founded: 1997
- Ceased operations: 1999
- Hubs: Toussaint Louverture International Airport
- Headquarters: Port-au-Prince, Haiti

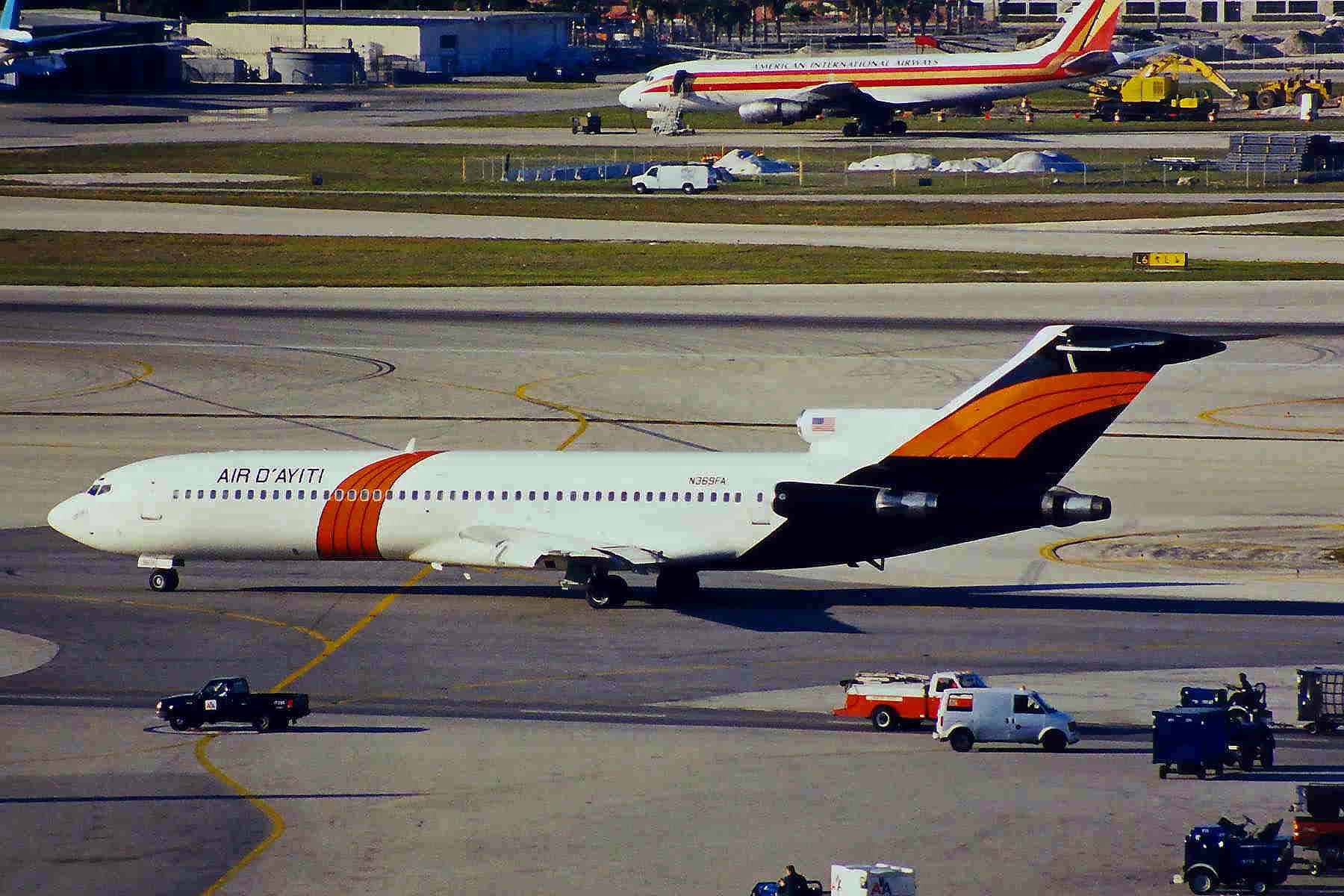
Air d'Ayiti Boeing 727-200 taxiing at Miami International Airport in 1999

Air d'Ayiti was a short-lived airline based in Port-au-Prince, Haiti, which was operational between 1997 and 1999. It operated scheduled and charter flights within the Caribbean and to Miami in the United States.

== Fleet ==
Air d'Ayiti operated a single Boeing 727-200 leased from Falcon Air Express.

== See also ==
- List of defunct airlines of Haiti
