= Battle of La Bombarde =

- Part of the Haitian Revolution and the War of the First Coalition
Date	March 1794
Location	La Bombarde (in present day Môle-Saint-Nicolas), Haiti
Result	Victory of the German settlers

Belligerents
German settlers	(Kingdom of Great Britain) Great Britain (Kingdom of France) French Royalists

Commanders and leaders
Unknown	Spencer; Markham

Strength
450 men	500 men

Casualties and losses
Unknown	16 dead 36 captured

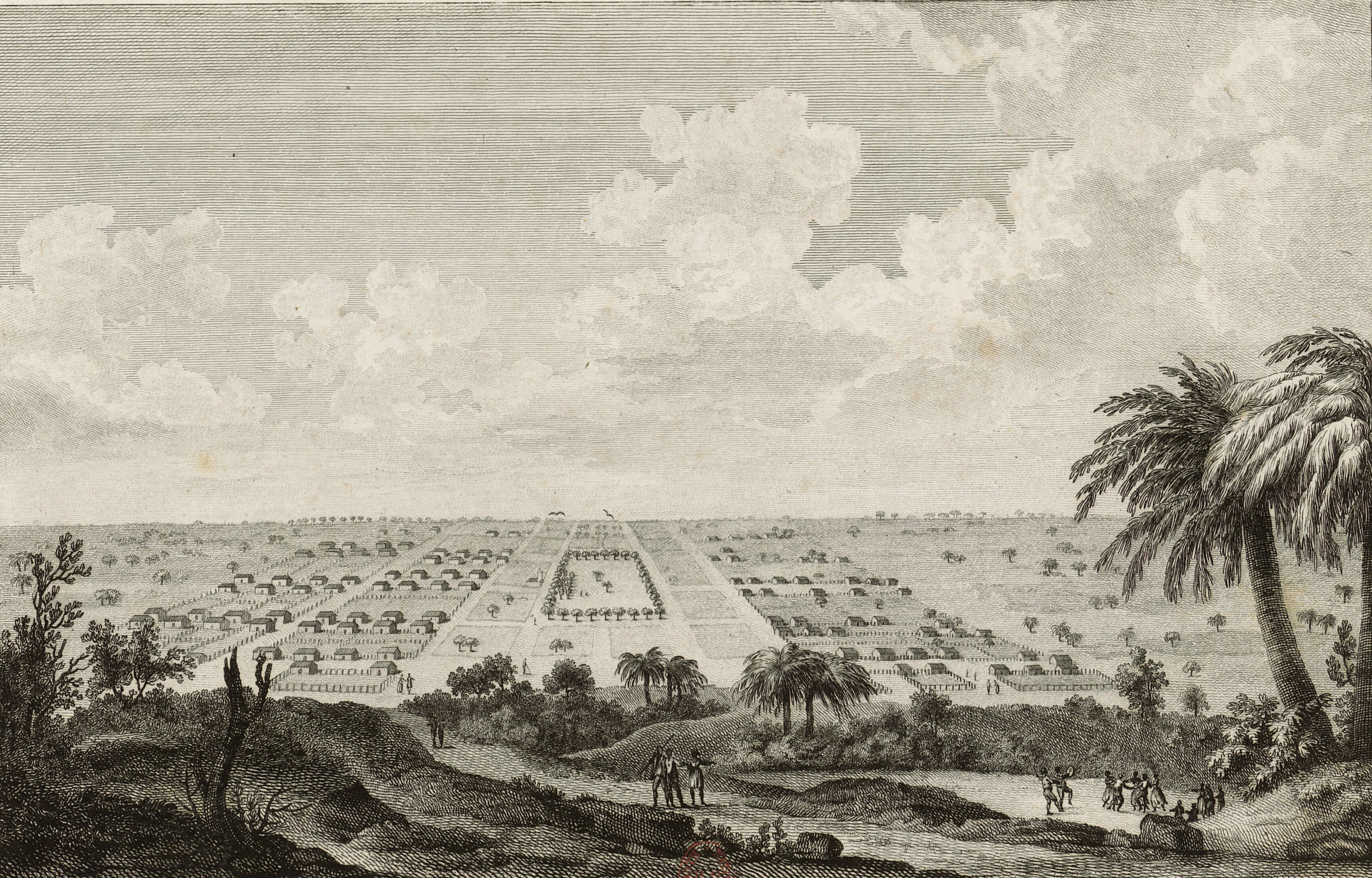
View of Bombardopolis or Bombard (Alexis-Nicolas Pérignon and Nicolas Ponce)

The Battle of La Bombarde took place during the Haitian Revolution.

== Battle ==
In March 1794, British lieutenant colonels Spencer and Markham, who were stationed in Môle-Saint-Nicolas, were given order to attack the settlement La Bombarde. They had 200 English soldiers and 300 sailors under their command, and was accompanied by two French interpreters Deneux and Charmilly. They were met with resistance from 450 German settlers, and were repelled after 16 men were killed and 36 men taken prisoners.
