= MTCH =

MTCH may refer to:

- Cap-Haïtien International Airport, ICAO airport code
- Match Group, stock symbol
