= Port-Salut Airport =

Airport in Haiti

Port-Salut Airport Aéroport de Port-Salut
- IATA: none; ICAO: none

Summary
- Airport type: Public
- Serves: Port-Salut
- Elevation AMSL: 42 ft / 13 m
- Coordinates: 18°03′52″N 73°54′45″W

Map
- Location of the airport in Haiti

Runways
Direction	Length		Surface
Direction	m	ft	Surface
09/27	800	2,625	Grass
- Sources: GCM Google Maps

Port-Salut Airport is an airport serving Port-Salut, a coastal commune in the Sud Department of Haiti. The runway is 3.5 kilometres (2.2 mi) southeast of the town and runs from the shore inland to Departmental Rte 25.

== See also ==
- Transport in Haiti
- List of airports in Haiti
