= Anse-Rouge Airport =

Airport in Haiti

Anse-Rouge Airport Ayewopò Ans Wouj
- IATA: none; ICAO: none

Summary
- Airport type: Public
- Serves: Anse-Rouge
- Elevation AMSL: 235 ft / 72 m
- Coordinates: 19°40′00″N 73°04′20″W

Map
- Location of the airport in Haiti

Runways
Direction	Length		Surface
Direction	m	ft	Surface
16/34	590	1,936	Gravel
- Sources: Google Maps

Anse-Rouge Airport is an airstrip 3 kilometres (1.9 mi) northwest of Anse-Rouge, a coastal town in the department of Artibonite, Haiti. Google Earth Historical Imagery shows the airstrip was constructed sometime between June 2000 and September 2003.

== See also ==
- Transport in Haiti
- List of airports in Haiti
