= Fond-des-Blancs Airport =

Airport in Haiti

Fond-des-Blancs Airport Ayewopò Fondèblan
- IATA: none; ICAO: none

Summary
- Airport type: Public
- Serves: Fond-des-Blancs
- Elevation AMSL: 822 ft / 251 m
- Coordinates: 18°17′10″N 73°06′40″W

Map
- Location of the airport in Haiti

Runways
| Direction | Length | | Surface |
| Direction | m | ft | Surface |
|---|---|---|---|
| 11/29 | 620 | 2,034 | Grass |
- Sources: Google Maps

Fond-des-Blancs Airport is an airstrip 2 kilometres (1.2 mi) northeast of Fond-des-Blancs, a communal section in the Sud Department of Haiti. It is surrounded by rising terrain in all quadrants, with large hills immediately south of the runway.

== See also ==
- Transport in Haiti
- List of airports in Haiti
