= Hinch =

Hinch may refer to:

- Hinch (surname)
- Hinch, Missouri, US
- Hinch, West Virginia, US
