= Caribair =

Airline based in Santo Domingo, Dominican Republic

| IATA | ICAO | Call sign |
|---|---|---|
| B9 | CBC | CARIBAIR |
- Founded: 1983
- Ceased operations: 2009
- Hubs: La Isabela International Airport
- Secondary hubs: Cibao International Airport; Las Américas International Airport; Gregorio Luperón International Airport
- Focus cities: María Montez International Airport; Port-au-Prince International Airport; Arroyo Barril International Airport
- Parent company: Caribair, Inc.
- Headquarters: Santo Domingo
- Key people: Rafael Rosado Fermin (CEO)
- Website: http://www.caribair.com.do/ingles/index.html

Caribair was an airline based in Santo Domingo, Dominican Republic. It operated scheduled services within the Dominican Republic and to Haiti, as well as charter flights and air taxi services throughout the Caribbean. Its main base was La Isabela International Airport, Santo Domingo.

== History ==
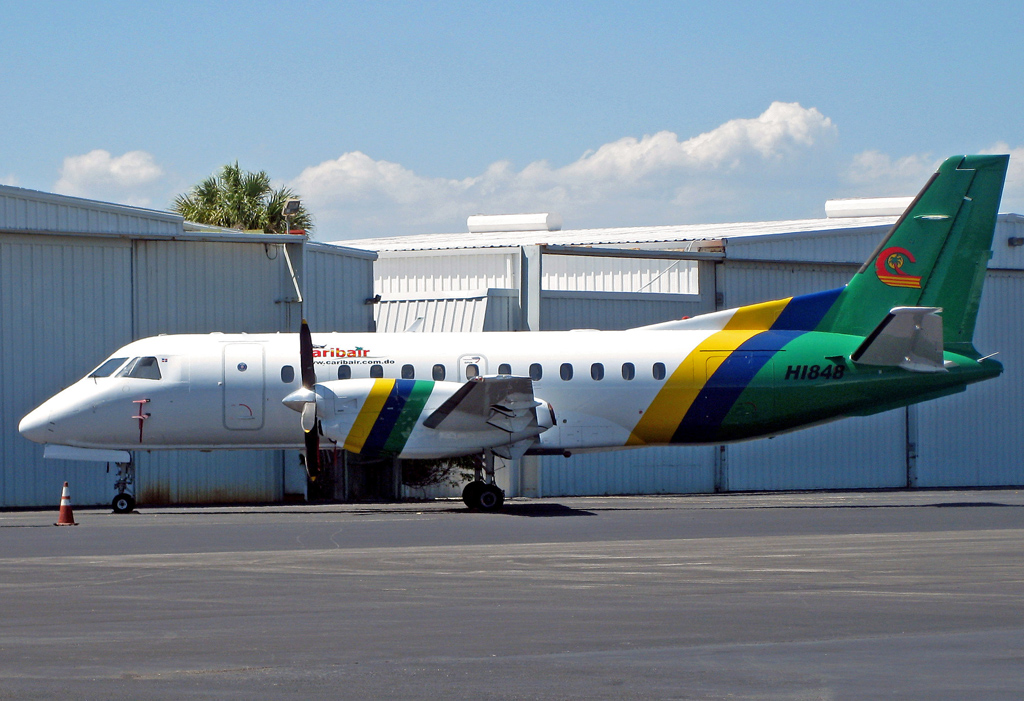
Saab 340A of Caribair in storage at Fort Lauderdale Executive Airport in April 2011

The airline was established and began operations in 1983. It began operations with two aircraft and changed ownership in 1988.

On January 20, 2009, the Dominican Civil Aviation Institute (IDAC) ordered Caribair to suspend its flight operations due to alleged "operational irregularities". Caribair reportedly was found by IDAC inspectors to be "masking multiple commercial operations as private operations in unauthorized airplanes." The company announced on January 26, 2009, that it would appeal the suspension. IDAC later allowed the airline to recommence operations, with a reduced schedule using only two aircraft.

== Destinations ==
Caribair operated services to the following international scheduled destinations (at January 2005): Port-au-Prince and Santiago de Cuba.

Caribair flew to 26 destinations in nine countries, including Aruba, the Bahamas, Haiti, Netherlands Antilles, Jamaica, Puerto Rico, Trinidad and Tobago, Cuba, and some scheduled charter flights to the United States.

Domestics destinations included all airports in Dominican Republic, making it the largest airline of the country.

== Fleet ==
In March 2007 the Caribair fleet included the following aircraft:

Caribair Airlines fleet
| Aircraft | Total | Passengers (Economy) | Notes |
|---|---|---|---|
| Saab 340A | 2 | 36 | |
| BAe Jetstream 31 | 3 | 19 | |
| Let L-410 UVP | 2 | 19 | |
| Let L-410 UVP-E | 3 | 19 | |
| Britten-Norman BN2A Islander | 2 | 11 | |
| Piper PA-31 Navajo | 3 | 7 | |
| Piper Saratoga | 1 | 4 | |
| Cessna 172 | 1 | 3 | |
| Total | 17 | | |

== Codeshare agreements ==
Caribair was the parent company of the Haitian airline Caribintair. Caribair had six aircraft in leasing for this airline, operating domestics flights in Haiti, as well as some international flights to Santo Domingo and Santiago, Dominican Republic. They also operated charter flights into Barahona and Dajabon. All Caribintair flights were codeshared by Caribair.
