= IBC Airways =

Airline of the United States

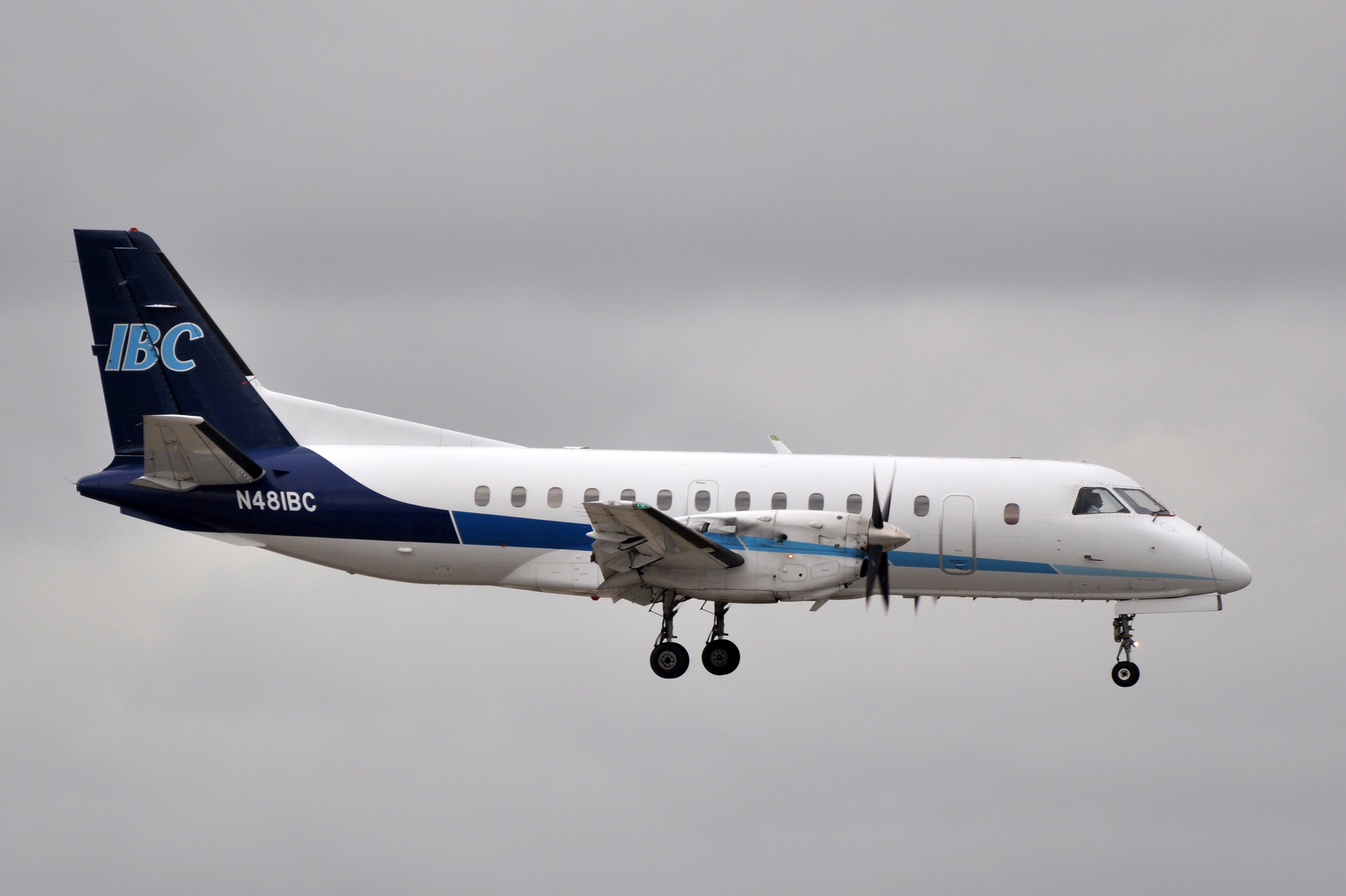
IATA	ICAO	Call sign
II	CSQ	CHASQUI
- Founded: 1991
- Hubs: Miami International Airport
- Fleet size: 13
- Destinations: 13
- Headquarters: Fort Lauderdale, Florida, United States
- Key people: Joe Costigan, President
- Website: www.ibcairways.com www.flyibcair.com

IBC Airways is an FAR Part 135 on-demand airline headquartered in unincorporated Broward County, Florida, United States, near Fort Lauderdale. IBC Airways operates on-demand cargo services to the Caribbean. Its main base is Miami International Airport (MIA). In 2005, IBC Airways began offering on-demand passenger services.

== History ==
The airline was established in 1991. It developed out of Joseph Costigan's recognition that the Caribbean market was not sufficiently serviced by the legacy airlines.

It previously had its head office in Building 101 in unincorporated Miami-Dade County in Greater Miami.

The airline had previously flown flights from Fort Lauderdale to the Leeward airfield at the Guantanamo Bay Naval Base.

== Destinations ==
IBC Airways has scheduled flights to the following airports (as of January 2025:

- Grand Bahama International Airport
- Las Américas International Airport
- Luis Muñoz Marín International Airport
- Lynden Pindling International Airport
- Miami International Airport
- Norman Manley International Airport
- Owen Roberts International Airport
- Providenciales International Airport
- Sangster International Airport
- Toussaint Louverture International Airport
- Antoine Simon International Airport*

== Fleet ==
The IBC Airways fleet comprises the following aircraft (as of October 2020):

IBC Airways fleet
Aircraft	In service	Orders	Passengers
Embraer ERJ 145EP	1 (as of August 2025)	—	30
Hawker 800XP	1	—	9
Saab 340AF	4(as of August 2025)	—	0
SAAB SF-340BF	5(as of August 2025)	—	0
Total	12	0	

The airline fleet previously included the following aircraft (as of May 2019):

- 5 Fairchild Swearingen Metroliner

== Incidents and accidents ==
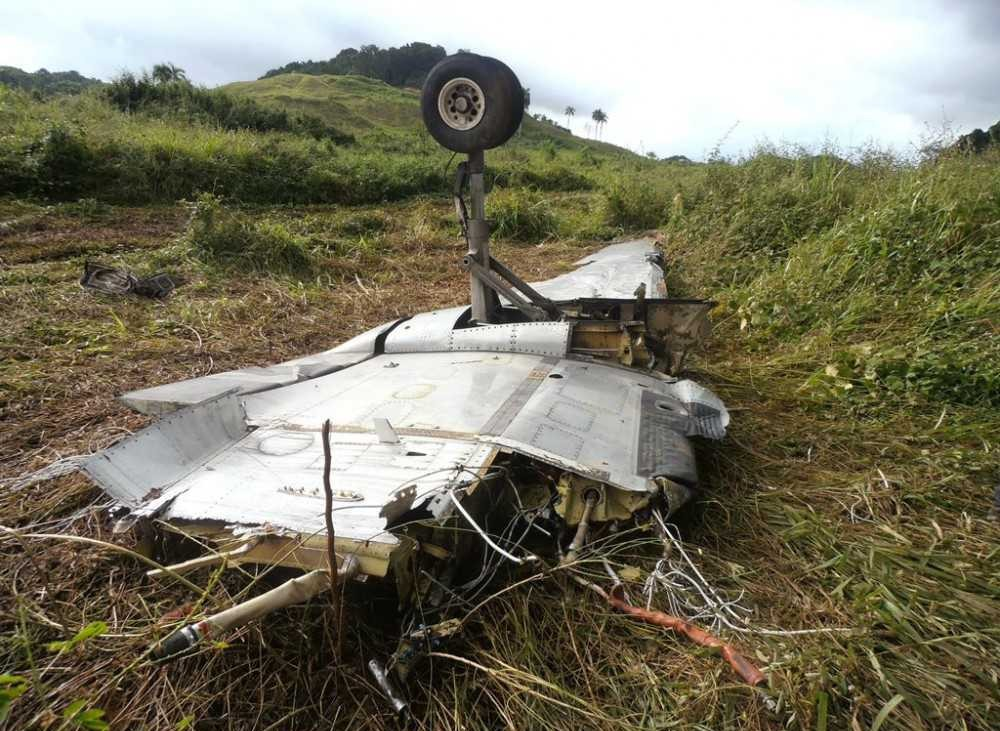
Part of the wing, the extended landing gear clearly visible

- On 2 December 2013, IBC Airways Flight 405, a 28-year-old Fairchild SA227-AC Metro III on a cargo flight from Las Américas International Airport, Santo Domingo, Dominican Republic to Luis Muñoz Marín International Airport, Puerto Rico, crashed near La Alianza after suffering a structural failure. The crash killed the 35-year-old captain, who had 1,740 flight hours, 686 of which were on the Fairchild SA227-AC Metro III, and the 28-year-old first officer, who had 1,854 flight hours, including only 92 on the same aircraft type. The accident was investigated by the National Transportation Safety Board which concluded that it was caused by the flight crew's excessively abrupt use of the elevator controls during a rapid descent at night. This led to structural overload and the subsequent in-flight breakup of the aircraft. A contributing factor was an initial loss of control, the cause of which could not be determined, as the investigation revealed no mechanical anomalies.
- On March 21, 2026, an IBC Airways Embraer 145 overran a runway while landing at the Antoine Simon International Airport in Haiti. The plane, arriving from Miami, had trouble braking because the runway had flooded. The airplane was significantly damaged when it impacted a fence and came to rest just off of a roadway.
