= Caribintair =

Caribintair, S.A.
IATA	ICAO	Call sign
-	CRT	CARIBINTAIR
- Founded: c. 1989
- Ceased operations: 2009
- Hubs: Toussaint Louverture International Airport
- Secondary hubs: Cibao International Airport
- Focus cities: Hugo Chávez International Airport
- Frequent-flyer program: Haiti to Santiago
- Alliance: With Caribair
- Fleet size: 7
- Destinations: 5
- Parent company: Caribair
- Headquarters: Port-au-Prince
- Website: Unavailable

Caribintair was an airline that flew domestic and international routes from Port-au-Prince, Haiti. It was established in 1989. Operations stopped in April 2009.

It operated scheduled flights to Cap-Haïtien, Les Cayes, Jérémie, Santo Domingo, Santiago, Providenciales and Nassau.

In 2001, the airline's planes were grounded for two months because of unsolved insurance coverage issues. In September 2007, following two consecutive crashes, the airline's flights were suspended again.

== Fleet ==
- 2 BAe Jetstream 31
- 2 Let L-410 Turbolet
- 3 Cessna 208

== Codeshare agreements ==
Caribair was the parent company of Caribintair. Caribair had six aircraft on lease for this airline. Caribair operated domestic flights in Haiti, as well as some international flights to Santo Domingo and Santiago, Dominican Republic. It also operated charter flights into Barahona and Dajabon. All Caribintair flights Were codeshared by Caribair.
