= Hinch (surname) =

Hinch is a surname. Notable people with the surname include:

- A. J. Hinch (born 1974), American baseball manager and former player
- Derryn Hinch (1944–2026), Australian television host and former politician
  - Hinch Live, later simply Hinch (2015–2016, 2019), a Sky News television program hosted by Derryn Hinch
- Dick Hinch (1949–2020), American politician
- James Hinchcliffe (born 1986), Canadian racing driver
- Jimmy Hinch (born 1947), English footballer
- John Hinch (mathematician) (born 1947), mathematician
- John Hinch (musician) (born 1947), British drummer
- Maddie Hinch (born 1988), English field hockey player
- Mrs Hinch (Sophie Rose Hinchliffe, born 1990), British influencer and author

== See also ==
- Hinch (disambiguation)
