= List of airlines of Haiti =

This is a list of airlines currently operating in Haiti.

Airline	Image	IATA	ICAO	Callsign	Image	Commenced operations	Notes
Air Haiti							
Sunrise Airways		S6	KSZ	-		2012	
Zed Airlines							virtual airline

== See also ==
- List of airlines
- List of defunct airlines of Haiti
