= Anse-à-Galets =

Anse-à-Galets: Ansagalèt
- Commune
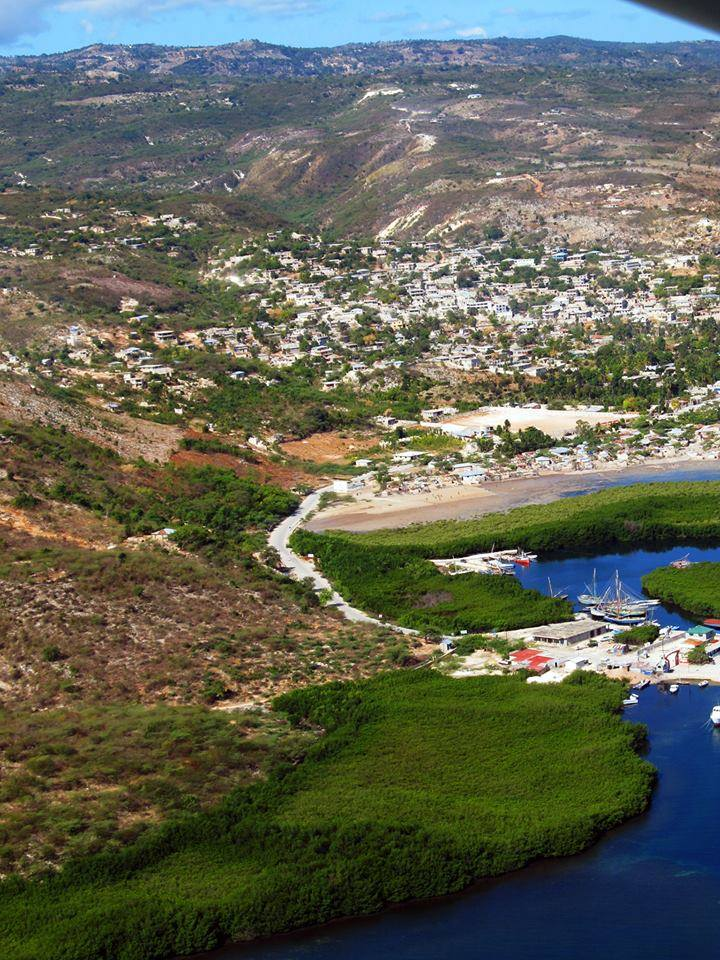

- Location in Haiti
- Coordinates: 18°50′02″N 72°51′58″W
- Country: Haiti
- Department: Ouest
- Arrondissement: La Gonâve

Area
  - Total: 372.01 km^{2} (143.63 sq mi)
- Elevation: 16 m (52 ft)

Population (March, 2015)
  - Total: 62,559
  - Density: 168/km^{2} (440/sq mi)
- Time zone: UTC-05:00 (EST)
  - Summer (DST): UTC-04:00 (EDT)

Anse-à-Galets (French pronunciation: [ɑ̃s a ɡalɛ]; Haitian Creole: Ansagalèt) is a commune and city in the La Gonâve Arrondissement, in the Ouest department on Gonâve Island in Haiti, located to the west-northwest of Port-au-Prince in the Gulf of Gonâve. It is the largest commune on the island and has 62,559 inhabitants.

The current mayor of the city of Anse-a-Galets is Ernso Louissaint.

== Transportation ==
The commune is served by Anse-à-Galets Airport and a public wharf. The public wharf has daily ferry traffic to the Haitian mainland at the Carries Ferry terminal.
