= Air Haïti =

Haitian airline (1969–1982)

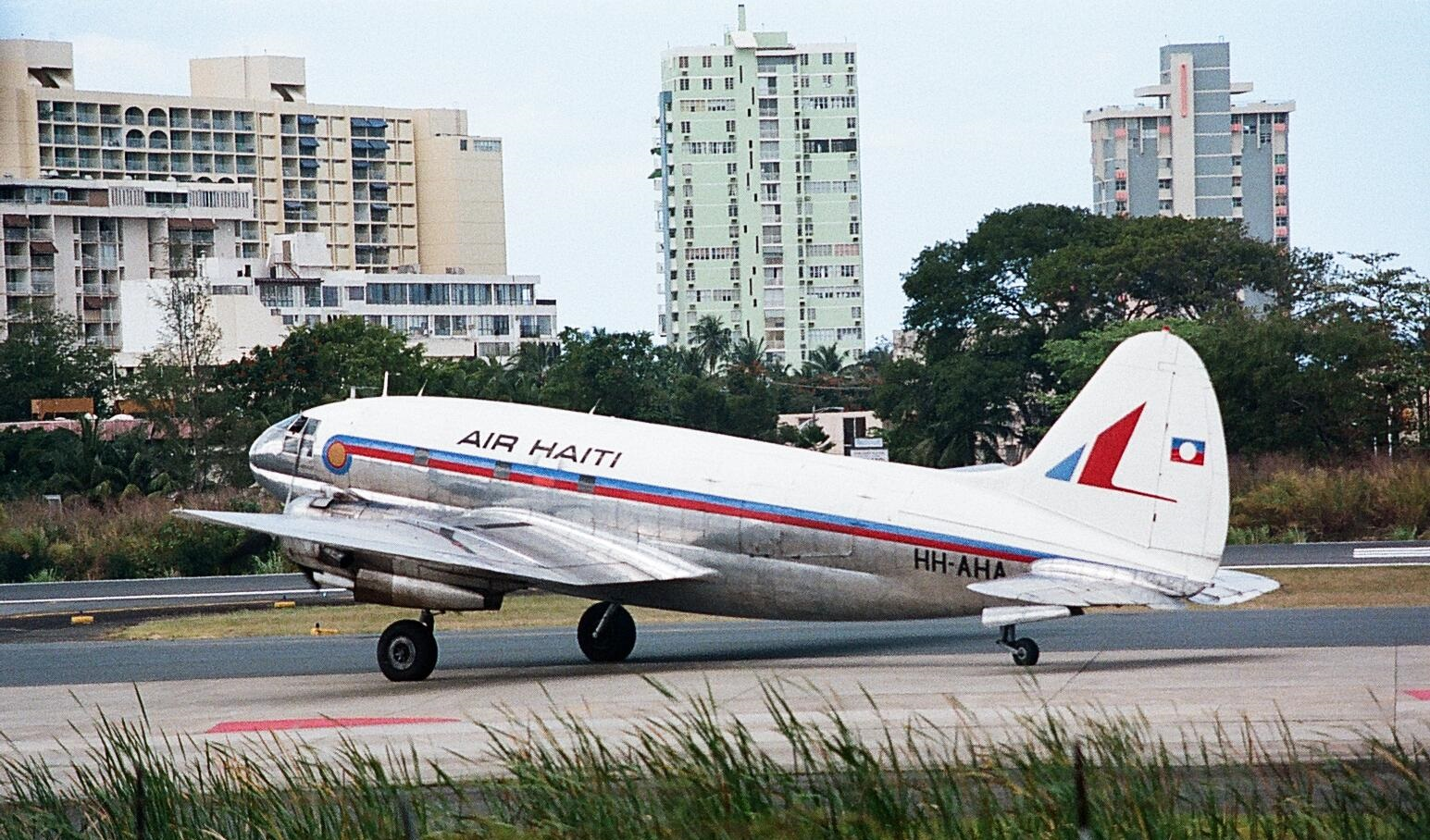
- C 46 of Air Haiti in San Juan, 1986
IATA	ICAO	Call sign
HJ	HJA	Air Haiti
- Founded: 1969
- Commenced operations: 1969
- Ceased operations: 1991
- Fleet size: 4
- Headquarters: Haiti

Air Haïti was an airline based in Haiti.

== History ==
Air Haiti SA was formed in December 1969 following the award of a five-year foreign air carrier permit by the US Civil Aeronautics Administration All-cargo scheduled services began in October 1970 between Port-au-Prince Airport, Isla Verde Airport in San Juan, Puerto Rico and Miami International Airport. Initially Curtiss C-46 Commando freighters were used but these were supplemented by leased Douglas DC-6A cargo aircraft. For a few years, Air Haïti's C-46 Commandos were a common sight at airports such as San Juan, Puerto Rico and Miami International. The airline operated from 1969. Air Haïti was later re-launched by Air Lébér, which at that point owned 89% of the airline. The government of Haiti owns 11%.

== Destinations ==
In summer of 1981, Air Haiti operated services to:

- Haiti
  - Port-au-Prince – Toussaint Louverture International Airport
- United States
  - Miami – Miami International Airport
  - New York City – John F. Kennedy International Airport

== Fleet ==
Air Haïti used to operate during the years:

- 3 Boeing 707-331C
- 6 Curtiss-Wright C-46A Commando
- 4 Douglas DC-6A/B
- 2 Douglas DC-8-20
