= Môle-Saint-Nicolas =

Môle-Saint-Nicolas Mòlsennikola or Omòl
- Commune
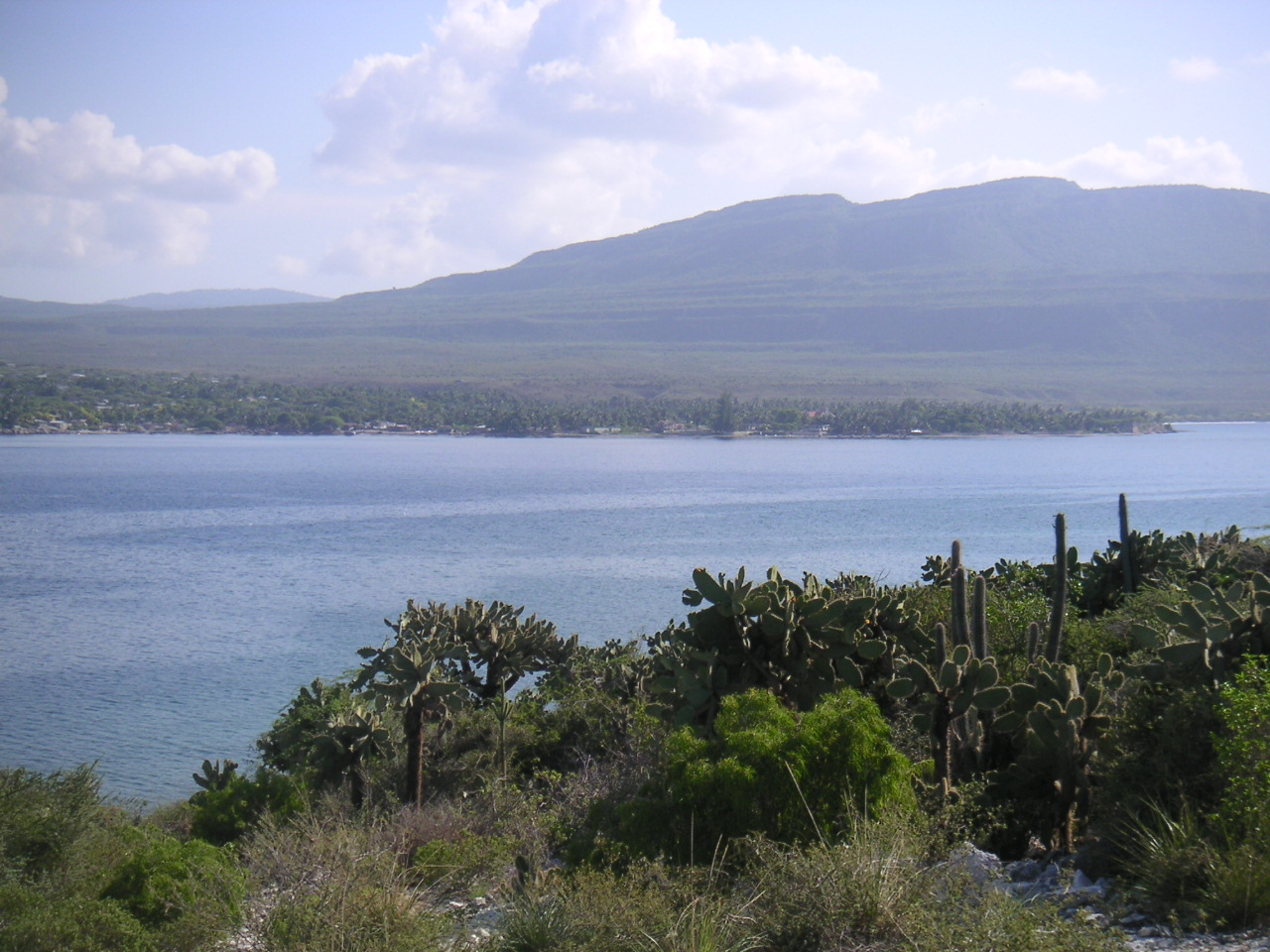
- The town as seen from Presque Île

- Location in Haiti
- Coordinates: 19°48′17″N 73°22′30″W
- Country: Haiti
- Department: Nord-Ouest
- Arrondissement: Môle-Saint-Nicolas
- Highest elevation: 19 m (61 ft)
- Time zone: UTC-05:00 (EST)
  - Summer (DST): UTC-04:00 (EDT)

Môle-Saint-Nicolas (French pronunciation: [mol sɛ̃ nikɔla]; Haitian Creole: Mòlsennikola or Omòl) is a commune in the north-western coast of Haiti. It is the chief town of the Môle-Saint-Nicolas Arrondissement in the department of Nord-Ouest.

== History ==
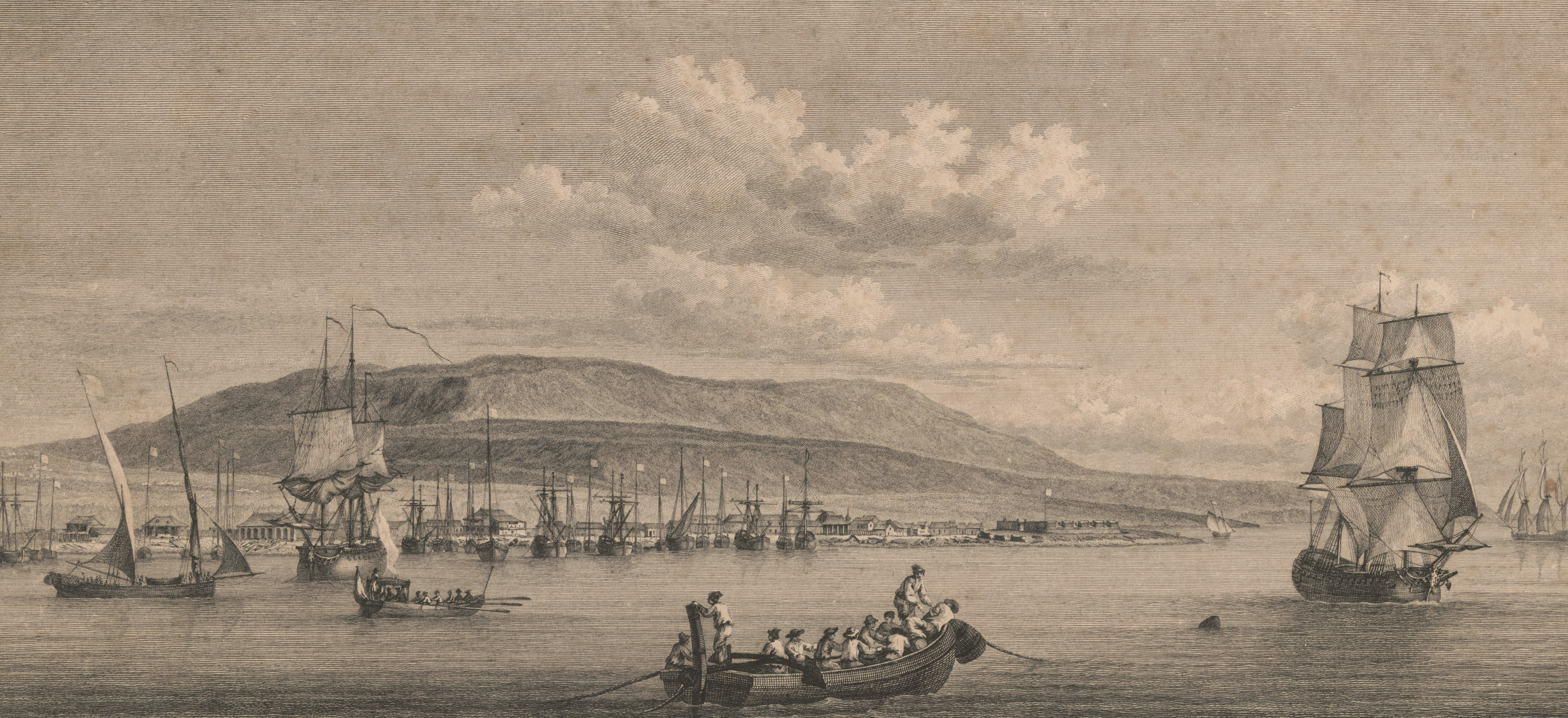
Môle-Saint-Nicolas in 1780

Christopher Columbus' first voyage to the Americas landed at the site of what is now Môle-Saint-Nicolas on December 6, 1492. The town received its present name after France gained control of the western part of Hispaniola in 1697. Vestiges of colonial forts can be found in several locations: Batteries de Vallières, Fort Georges, Saint-Charles, La Poudrière, Le Fort Allemand, Les Ramparts. Ruine Poudrière is an old magazine built sometime in the 1750s.

In 1764, after the Grand Dérangement had exiled thousands of Acadians from their northern homelands, there was an attempt by French authorities to settle them at Môle-Saint-Nicolas, to shore up France's most lucrative colony of Saint-Domingue and build a base that could be used by the French Navy. It was a disaster, thanks to disease and shortages of food; a visiting French official reported: "The greatest criminal would have preferred the Galleys to a torture session in this plague-stricken place." Within a year, a reported 420 of the 700 Acadian settlers were dead, and most of the survivors fled to Louisiana shortly thereafter.

In the summer of 1889, Frederick Douglass was appointed minister to Haiti by the administration of then President of the United States, Benjamin Harrison. Instructions to Douglass included the encouragement of the acquisition of Môle-Saint-Nicolas for use as a U.S. naval coaling station for the American fleet. Douglass attempted to secure access to the site through a lease, presenting arguments emphasizing the mutual benefits to trade and the legitimization of Haitian sovereignty to the American public and administration. Any negotiations were scuttled by the intervention of the U.S. Navy, as well as New York businessman William P. Clyde, who wished to establish monopoly steamship access to Haitian ports. Admiral Bancroft Gherardi was sent to "assist" in the negotiations and arrived in an American battleship in the harbor at Port-au-Prince, followed by additional warships arriving at other Haitian ports. Fiercely proud of their revolutionary heritage and national sovereignty, the Haitians were appalled by Gheradi's attitude and statements ("it was the destiny of the Môle to belong to the United States") and by Clyde's insistence that his company should have exclusive control of all Haitian commercial shipping. As a result, the Haitians refused any control of Môle-Saint-Nicolas or other ports to the Americans. Douglass was attacked for his "failure" to secure the city, and finally resigned his position as minister as a result of threats from the military. The U.S. backed down from the confrontation, and seven years later, secured Guantánamo Bay in Cuba as a naval base in the region.

== Demographics ==
Môle-Saint-Nicolas has a population of about 4,000 people, with another 20,000 spread throughout the rural areas nearby. The town has running water from a run-of-river channel constructed in the 1970s, which feeds a reservoir above the town and is distributed via PVC pipes to spigots throughout the town.

== Economy ==
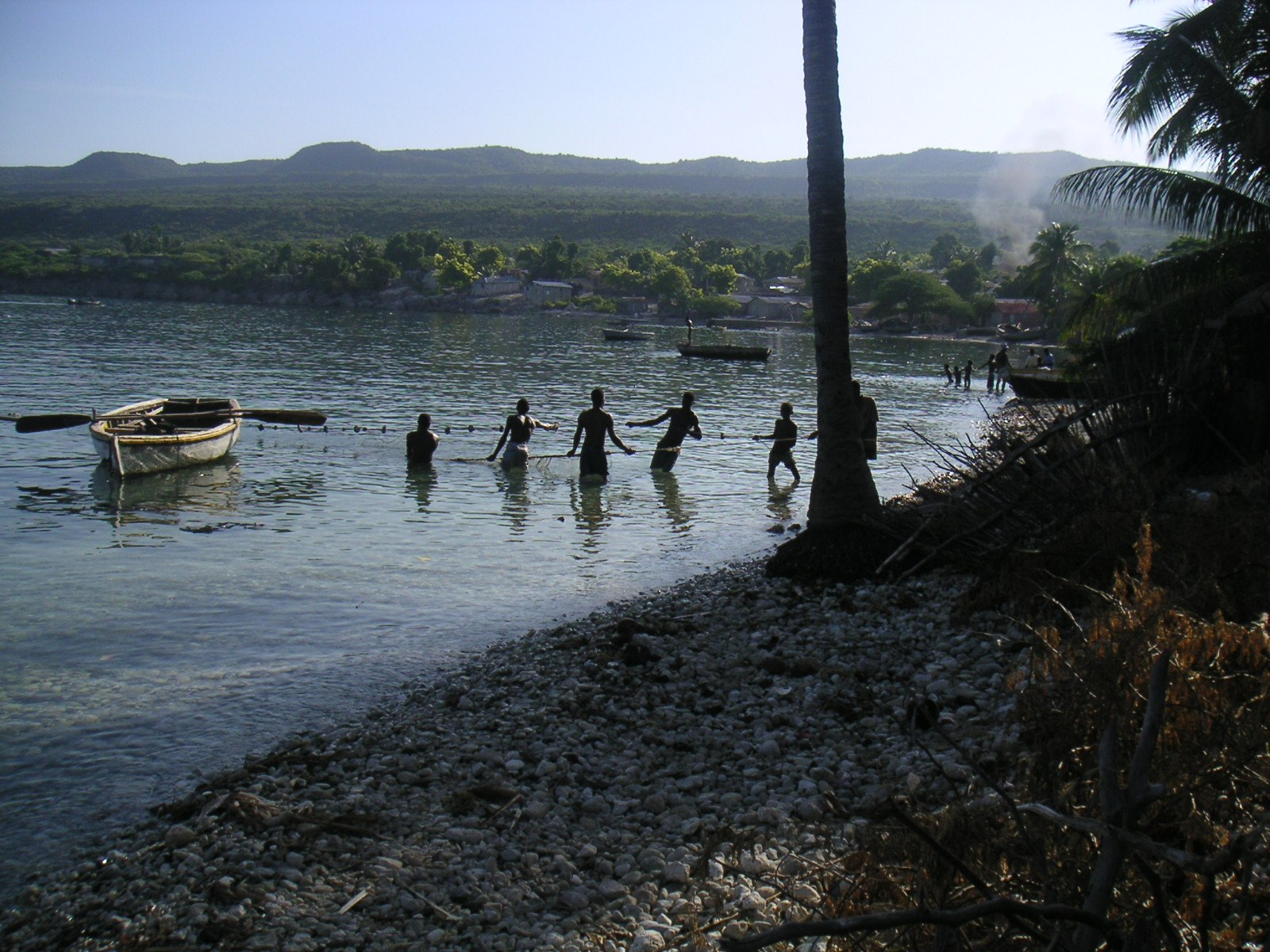
People fishing with nets

Local fishing is a major industry in this part of the country. The production and distribution of wood charcoal is another major industry of the local people. There is a port for transporting charcoal to larger cities that utilizes wooden sailing vessels to transport the major fuel for cooking in Haiti. Charcoal production has destroyed the original forest that once covered this area. The landscape surrounding Mole looks more like the high desert of Arizona than a lush tropical island that was first described to Europeans by Christopher Columbus. Tourism is still growing, but still with its natural white sandy beaches, caves, and wide bay sheltered from the winds, also a clear and bluish sea with corals where some of multicolored fish live. It's an exotic panorama. It's streets are traced to selling cordeau for fishing, and its colonial vestiges and fine gastronomy are also important.

== Transportation ==
The road network of Haiti has become decrepit, with roads in Nord-Ouest being no exception. However, in Môle-Saint-Nicolas itself, the roads are passable in a sturdy vehicle. There is a dirt airstrip, Môle-Saint-Nicolas Airport, to the north of the town which is serviced by two airlines: Mission Aviation Fellowship and Sunrise Airways.

== Health ==
A medical clinic in the town has been staffed by Slovak volunteer doctors from a private university, since the end of 2006.

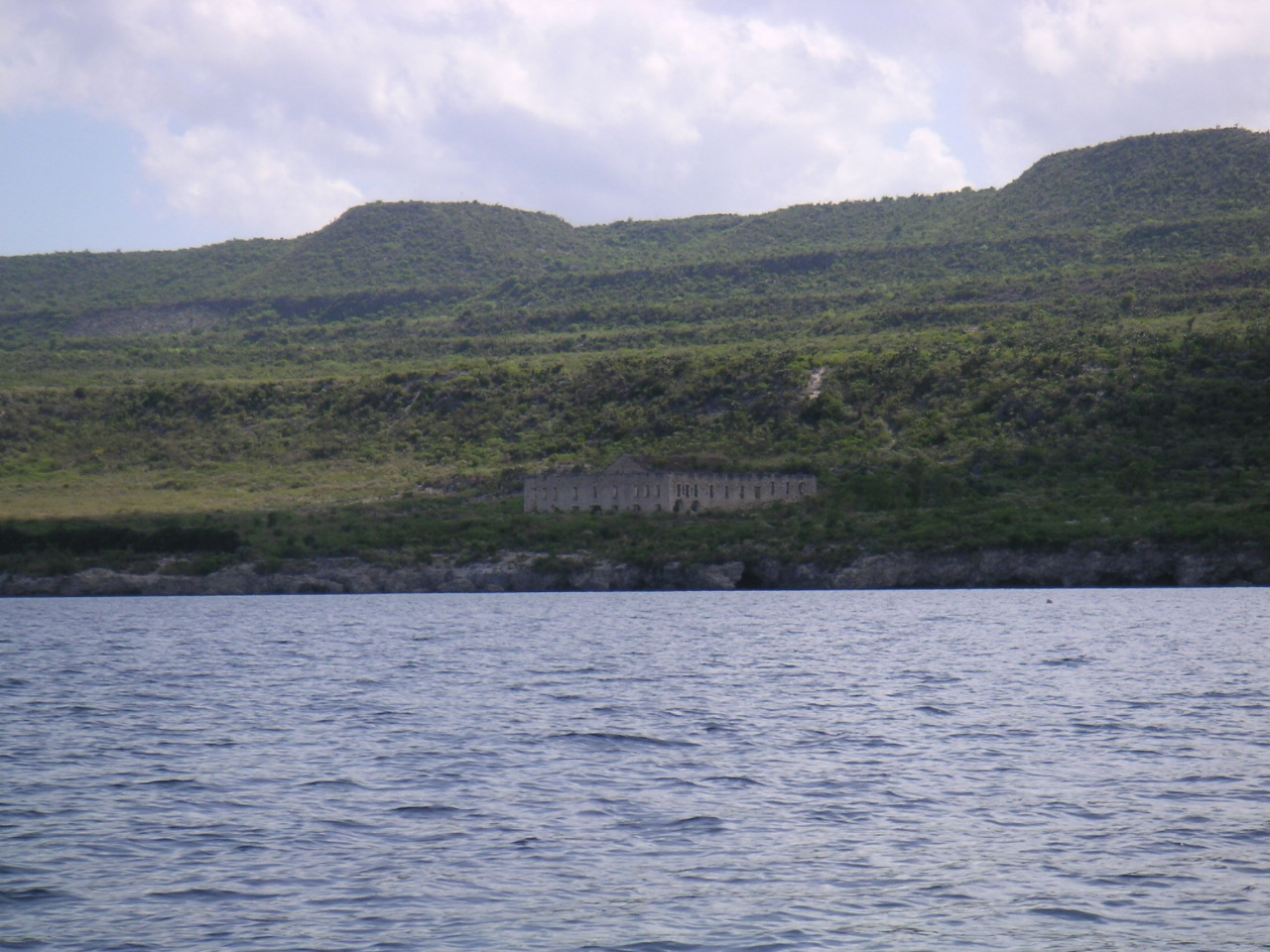
Ruine Poudrière, an 18th-century French magazine

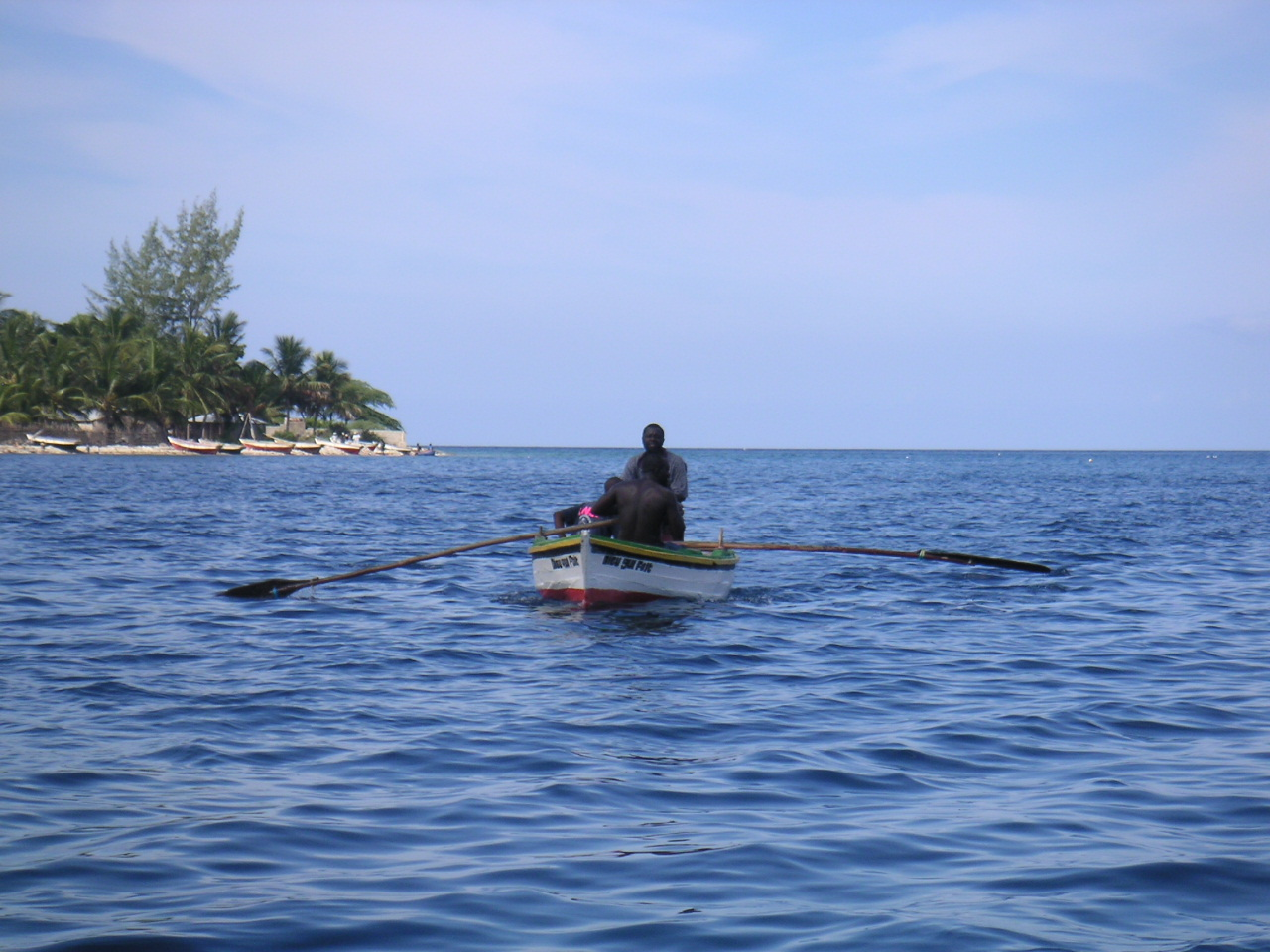
Fishermen off of Môle-Saint-Nicolas

== See also ==
- Môle Saint-Nicolas affair
