= Sunrise Airways =

Regional airline based in Haiti

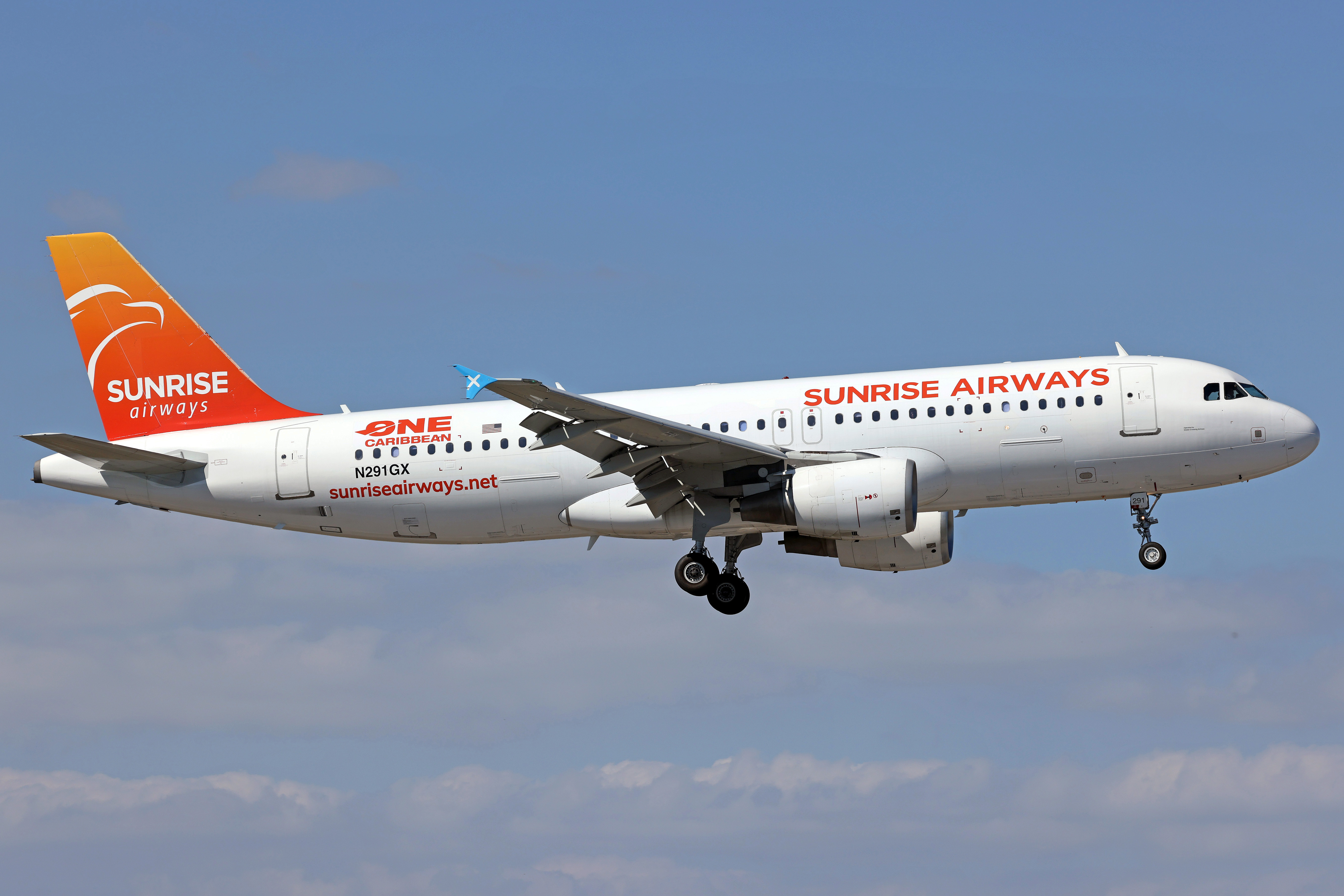
- Global Crossing Airlines Airbus A320 on lease to Sunrise Airways
IATA	ICAO	Call sign
S6	KSZ	SUNRISE
- Founded: 2010
- Commenced operations: 2012
- Hubs: Toussaint Louverture International Airport V.C. Bird International Airport
- Subsidiaries: Servicios Aéreos Geca, Sunrise Airways Dominica, Sunrise Airways Dominicana
- Fleet size: 6
- Destinations: 10
- Headquarters: Port-au-Prince, Haiti
- Key people: Philippe Bayard (President)
- Website: sunriseairways.net

Sunrise Airways S.A. is a Haitian regional airline founded in 2010 that provides scheduled passenger and charter flights. As of January 2024, the airline flies to nine domestic and international destinations and has a fleet size of ten.

Sunrise Airways expanded its fleet in 2017 with the addition of a new Boeing 737.

== History ==
In Haitian aviation history, a number of local airlines only were able to serve Haiti for short periods of time before collapsing. Sunrise Airways was founded in 2010 by former pilot Philippe Bayard after him noticing, while working for Tortug' Air, that the planes were often in a state of disrepair and he was often not paid on time. The new airline was named after the "Sunrise Salute" in karate.

It started operations in 2012, initially flying between Haiti and the Turks and Caicos Islands. They gradually grew to a fleet of twelve planes, with their most popular route being to Miami, United States due to not many other international airlines serving Haiti. Due to Tortug' Air ceasing operations in 2015, Sunrise Airways is Haiti's only airline.

Haitians would criticize the airline of Sunrise Airways after it would raise its prices significantly which led to it being accused of exploiting Haitians. The same year it began its flights to St. Kitts and Nevis, Antigua, and Saint Lucia.

In 2026, Sunrise Airways launched further flights to the United States from Cap-Haïtien International Airport, due to the American Federal Aviation Administration banning flights from Toussaint Louverture International Airport in Port-au-Prince on security grounds.

== Destinations ==
As of May 2024, Sunrise Airways offers scheduled flights to nine domestic and international destinations, serving four cities in Haiti, five international cities and five countries in the Caribbean. Four new Caribbean destinations were just announced. Antigua was announced as a hub for the airline's Eastern Caribbean regional expansion.

Country	City	Airport	Notes	Refs
Cuba	Havana	José Martí International Airport		
Cuba	Santiago de Cuba	Antonio Maceo Airport		
Dominican Republic	Santo Domingo	Las Américas International Airport		
Dominican Republic	Santo Domingo	La Isabela International Airport		
Haiti	Cap-Haïtien	Cap-Haïtien International Airport		
Haiti	Jérémie	Jérémie Airport		
Haiti	Les Cayes	Antoine-Simon Airport		
Haiti	Port-au-Prince	Toussaint Louverture International Airport	Hub	
Guadeloupe	Pointe-à-Pitre	Pointe-à-Pitre International Airport		
Antigua and Barbuda	Saint John's	V.C. Bird International Airport	Hub	
Dominica	Roseau	Douglas-Charles Airport		
St. Kitts and Nevis	Basseterre	Robert L. Bradshaw International Airport		
St. Lucia	Castries	George F. L. Charles Airport		
St. Maarten	Philipsburg	Princess Juliana International Airport		
United States	Miami	Miami International Airport		
United States	Fort Lauderdale	Fort Lauderdale-Hollywood International Airport		
United States	Newark	Newark Liberty International Airport		

=== Codeshare and Interline agreements ===
Sunrise Airways currently has a codeshare agreement with Cubana de Aviacion and Interline agreements with Hahn Air and Air Caraibes.

== Fleet ==
As of August 2025, the Sunrise Airways fleet consists of the following aircraft:

Sunrise Airways fleet
Aircraft	In service	Orders	Passengers	Notes
Embraer EMB 120ER Brasilia	3	—	30	As of July 2026
Embraer ERJ-145	1		50	Leased from Sahara African Aviation
British Aerospace Jetstream 32	1		19	As of July 2026
Cessna Caravan 208	1		9	Owned by Sunrise Airways
Total	6	—		

== See also ==
- List of airlines of Haiti
