= Fond-des-Blancs =

- Communal section
- Location within Haiti
- Coordinates: 18°17′N 73°08′W
- Country: Haiti
- Department: Sud
- Arrondissement: Aquin

Area
  - Total: 168 km^{2} (65 sq mi)

Population (2015)
  - Total: 19,010
  - Density: 113/km^{2} (293/sq mi)
- Time zone: UTC-5 (EST)

Fond-des-Blancs (French pronunciation: [fɔ̃ de blɑ̃]) is a communal section located in the Sud department of Haiti in the Aquin Arrondissement. It is one of several communities of Polish Haitians, mixed-race descendants of Polish Legionnaires who originally fought with the French against the Haitian Revolution.

Identifying with the Africans seeking freedom, some of the Poles switched sides and allied with the former slaves. After the rebellion and declaration of the Republic of Haiti, about 400-500 Poles settled in Haiti, in country areas, where they lived as peasants with Haitian wives and mixed-race children. They were given full citizenship in Haiti by Jean-Jacques Dessalines because of their support of the revolution.

== Transportation ==
Fond-des-Blancs is served by the Fond-des-Blancs Airport a local built airstrip.

== Healthcare ==
Fond-des-Blancs is home to St. Boniface Hospital, the largest full-service hospital open to all patients in the south of Haiti. It does not charge a fee for patients who cannot afford to pay. It offers maternal and neonatal health services, general and orthopedic surgery, emergency care, and inpatient and outpatient clinics for adults and children. It also runs one of the few inpatient spinal cord injury rehabilitation programs in the country. St. Boniface Hospital is operated by the Health Equity International, and run by a staff that is 98% Haitian.
