= Hinche =

Hinche Ench
- Commune
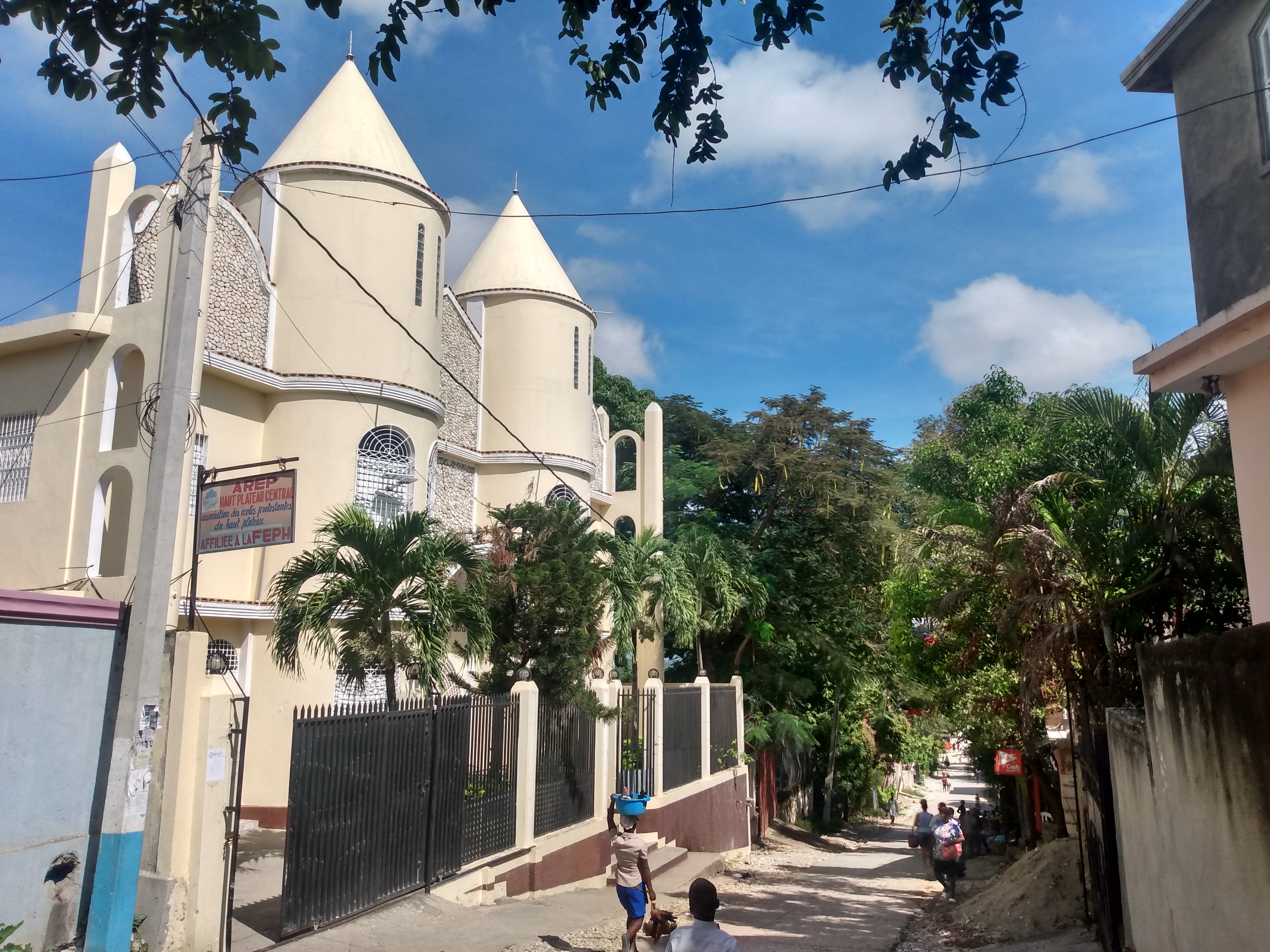
- Cathédrale de Sacré-Coeur in Hinche
- Nickname: La Cité de Charlemagne Peralte; The City of Charlemagne Peralte
- Interactive map of Hinche
- Location in Haiti
- Coordinates: 19°9′0″N 72°1′0″W
- Country: Haiti
- Department: Centre
- Arrondissement: Hinche
- Founded in: 1704

Government
  - Mayor: Jonel Jean-Baptiste

Area
  - Total: 588.4 km^{2} (227.2 sq mi)
- Elevation: 228 m (748 ft)

Population (2015)
  - Total: 120,867
  - Density: 205.4/km^{2} (532.0/sq mi)
- Time zone: UTC−05:00 (EST)
  - Summer (DST): UTC−04:00 (EDT)
- Postal code: HT 5110

Hinche (French pronunciation: [ɛ̃ʃ]; Haitian Creole: Ench; Spanish: Hincha) is a commune in the Centre department of Haiti. It has a population of about 50,000 in its urban area, which corresponds to the Juanaria communal section. The commune serves as the departamental capital of the Centre department. Its total population including the rural sections is 120,000 (2015 est.). Hinche is the hometown of Charlemagne Péralte, the Haitian nationalist leader who led rebel forces in the Second Caco War during the United States occupation of Haiti that lasted from 1915–1934.

== History ==
Historical affiliations

Spanish Empire 1704–1801
France 1801–1809
Spanish Empire 1809–1821
Republic of Spanish Haiti 1821–1822
Haiti 1822–1844
Dominican Republic 1844–1937
Haiti 1937–present

=== Colonial era ===
The island of Hispaniola was discovered by the navigator Christopher Columbus in 1492. The original population of the island, the Tainos, were gradually destroyed by the Spanish conquistadors.

The village of Hincha was founded in 1704, by Spanish settlers from the Canary Islands, on the site of the destroyed earlier settlement of Lares de Guahaba.

In 1739 its population was about 500, which by 1760 had grown to 3,092 people, of whom 1,443 were slaves. By 1783 its population had dropped to 2,993, due to the founding of San Rafael de La Angostura and San Miguel de la Atalaya in the Central Plateau, which along with San Francisco de Bánica and Dajabón had 18,000 inhabitants, representing 14% of the colony's population.

Its economy primarily focused on exporting beef to the incipient French colony of Saint-Domingue, where the meat was 750% more expensive. In 1743 it had 19,335 livestock (the second largest in the Spanish colony), and in 1772 the number of livestock rose to 30,000 head, the largest one in the colony.

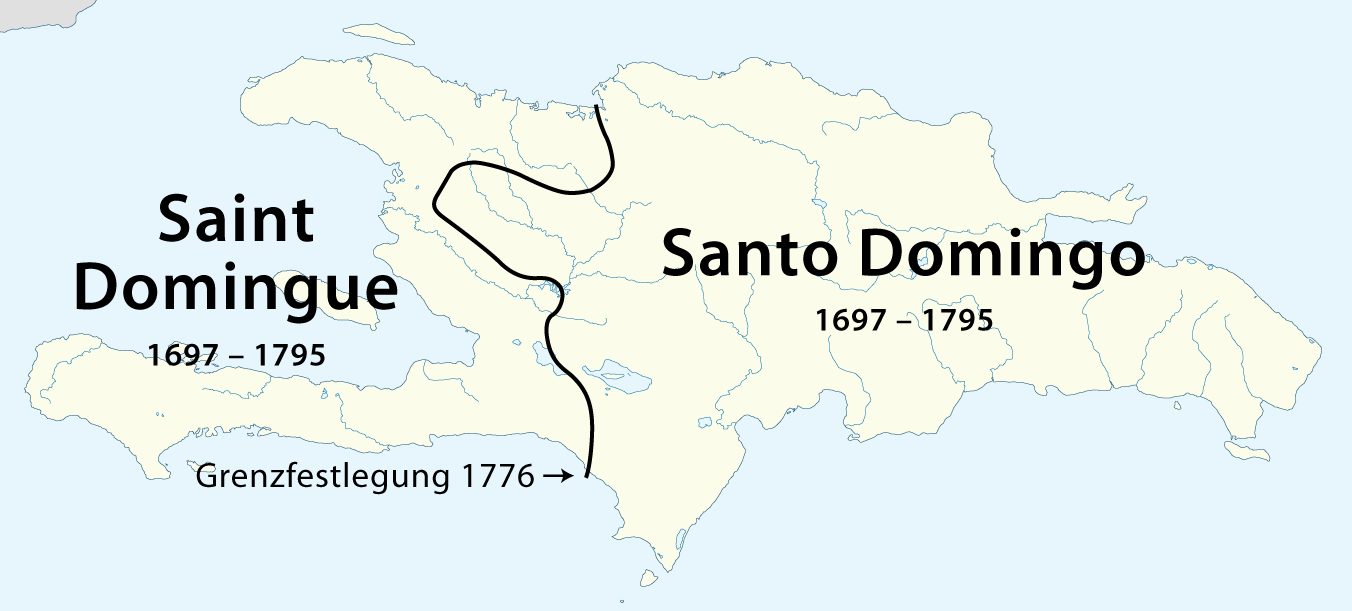
Map of the Spanish Santo Domingo and the French Saint-Domingue, with their border traced in 1777. Hinche, then known as Hincha, was in the Spanish side of the island.

In 1776, the governors of Saint-Domingue and Santo Domingo agreed in San Miguel de la Atalaya to the creation of a joint commission that would draw the border between the two colonies. The following year, Spain and France signed the Treaty of Aranjuez (1777), and the border between the Spanish and French colonies was plotted.

Hincha was the scene of armed conflict during the War of the First Coalition. At the end of this war, under the Peace of Basel, Spain was to yield to France all rights over Hispaniola in exchange for the regions of the Basque Country, Navarre, Catalonia and Valencia, occupied by France during the war. However France did not take possession of the Spanish colony under the treaty until 1802. In 1801, amid the Haitian Revolution, Toussaint Louverture captured Santo Domingo and proclaimed the emancipation of the slaves. The next year, Napoleon Bonaparte sent an army commanded by his brother-in-law, General Charles Leclerc, who captured L’Ouverture and sent him to France as prisoner. In 1809, during the course of the Napoleonic Wars, Spain regained its former possessions on the island and slavery was restored.

=== From 1821 to 1937 ===
On 1 December 1821 it was declared in Santo Domingo the independence of the Republic of Spanish Haiti by José Núñez de Cáceres. After this Jean Pierre Boyer invaded the Spanish side of the island. Haiti ruled this whole island for 22 years. In 1844 the former Spanish Haiti declared its independence and became the Dominican Republic.

Neighboring towns and cities like Hincha (now Hinche), Juana Méndez (now Ouanaminthe), San Rafael de La Angostura (now Saint-Raphaël), San Miguel de la Atalaya (now Saint-Michel-de-l’Atalaye), or Las Caobas (now Lascahobas), among others, remained isolated with little communication with the Dominican capital whilst there were a growing Haitian influence as the gourde circulated and in addition to the Spanish language, Haitian Creole was also spoken. Eventually these cities would be disputed between the two countries.

Hinche is the native town of Pedro Santana, first President of the Dominican Republic, as well of José de Guzmán, 1st Viscount of San Rafael de la Angostura, and Charlemagne Péralte, Haitian nationalist leader who resisted the occupation of Haiti by the United States (1915–1934).

=== Recent history ===
On 18 March 2016, at least 7 people were killed and 30 injured in Hinche when a fuel truck exploded while delivering fuel to a Total station in the city. Four homes and 22 vehicles were also destroyed in the accident.

== Culture ==
The official religion is Roman Catholicism, but the constitution allows the free choice of religion. There are also many non-Catholic Christian churches in the city and the surrounding communities. Groups, like the Haiti Endowment Fund (HEF) of Southern California send medical missionaries several times a year to provide medicines and basic healthcare. HEF has also helped build community churches. Some of the people also practice vodou.

=== Cuisine ===
Haitian cuisine is the most common type, which is a Creole cuisine made by combining West African and French influences. Créole cuisine is like other Caribbean cuisines, but more peppery. Specialties include griot (deep-fried pieces of pork), lambi (conch, considered an aphrodisiac), tassot (jerked beef) and rice with djon-djon (tiny, dark mushrooms). As elsewhere in the Caribbean, lobster is well known here. A wide range of microclimates produces a large assortment of fruits and vegetables. Vegetarians/vegans will have a difficult time here, because pig fat is often used in food preparation, so even beans are to be avoided.

Interesting cuisine-related features of Hinche, include a market and the "Foyer d’Accueil", an unmarked guesthouse above a school that is behind a blue and white church on the eastside of the main square.

=== Post-earthquake difficulties ===
In the wake of 12 January 2010, while no casualties or serious damage were reported in Hinche, thousands of refugees began pouring into the town.

=== Attractions ===
Hinche can be accessed by road or plane. It has one of the major Haitian airports which has a dirt runway that will allow a small Cessna and single engine planes to land. Usually, these flights are chartered from Port-au-Prince. Mission Aviation Fellowship offers charter flights to Hinche. East of Hinche, Bassin Zim is a 20 m waterfall in a lush setting, a 30-minute drive from town. In the city you will also find the Cathédrale de Sacré-Coeur.

== Transportation ==
Route Nationale 3, the 128-km semi-dirt road northeast from Port-au-Prince to Hinche requires a four-wheel drive and takes at least two hours (much longer by public transport). 100 percent of this road is now paved. It starts by crossing the Cul-de-Sac plain via Croix-des-Bouquets. Here, Route Nationale 8, a newly improved road, branches off southeast through a parched, barren region, skirting Lake Saumâtre before reaching the Dominican border at Malpasse. Mission Aviation Fellowship charters flights to the airport in town Hinche Airport. Before a flight comes in livestock and people must be cleared from the airstrip. The airport is located right near center city and right across the street is the hospital. The RN3 heads north out of Mirebalais on to the Central Plateau, where the military crackdown was especially harsh after the 1991 Haitian coup d'état because peasant movements had been pressing for change here for years. After skirting the Peligre Hydroelectric Dam, now silted up and almost useless, the road passes Thomonde and reaches this city.

== Media ==
=== Radio ===
- Radio Seven Stars
- Radio Leleonline FM
- Radio Super Continentale
- Radyo Leve Kanpe
- Radyo Vwa Peyizan
- Radio Quotidien FM
- Radio Immaculée Conceptio
- Radio Centre Inter
- Radio CAST FM
- Radio Communautaire de Pandiassou
- Radio MEN FM
- Le Prince FM
- Radio Africa
- Radio Combat FM

=== Television ===
- Télé Quotidien
- Tele Pam
- Tele Super Continentale
- Tele Seven Stars
- Tele Leve Kanpe
- Tele MEN

== See also ==
- List of cities in Haiti
