= Hinch, West Virginia =

Hinch
- Unincorporated community
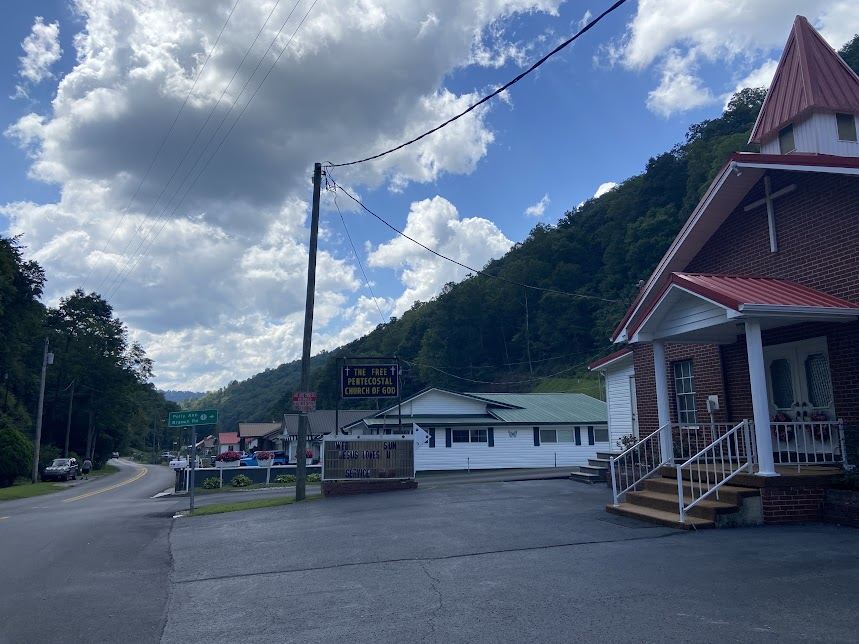

- Location within the state of West Virginia Hinch (the United States)
- Coordinates: 37°36′39″N 82°0′52″W
- Country: United States
- State: West Virginia
- County: Mingo
- Elevation: 1,230 ft (370 m)
- Time zone: UTC-5 (Eastern (EST))
  - Summer (DST): UTC-4 (EDT)
- GNIS ID: 1540309

Hinch is an unincorporated community in Mingo County, West Virginia, United States.
