= Phaeton, Haiti =

Phaeton
- Town
- Location in Haiti
- Coordinates: 19°40′27″N 71°53′50″W
- Country: Haiti
- Department: Nord-Est
- Arrondissement: Fort-Liberté
- Elevation: 1 m (3.3 ft)

Population (7 August 2003)
  - Total: 2,500
  - Summer (DST): (UTC -5.0)

Phaeton (Haitian Creole: Fayeton) is a town in the Fort-Liberté Arrondissement, in the Nord-Est department of Haiti. It is an old factory town, like its neighbor, Derac, as part of the old Dauphin Plantation residential area. When the plantation still operated (growing sisal, the town had a railroad route and a power plant that powered the city of Fort-Liberté, though poorly, until the 1980s. Phaeton is approximately 134 km / 83 mi from Haiti's capital Port-au-Prince. It is close to the border of the Dominican Republic.

== Transportation ==
Phaeton is served by an airport (Phaeton Airfield) which has charter flights from Port-au-Prince
