= Malpasse =

Haitian border town

- Town
- Location in Haiti
- Coordinates: 18°29′20″N 71°53′1″W
- Country: Haiti
- Department: Ouest
- Arrondissement: Croix-des-Bouquets
- Commune: Ganthier

Malpasse (French pronunciation: [malpas]) is a town in the Croix-des-Bouquets Arrondissement in the Ouest department of Haiti. Its border crossing to Jimaní is one of the four chief land crossings to the Dominican Republic.

It is connected to the National Route 8.
