= Ouanaminthe =

Ouanaminthe Wanament Wanamèt Juana Méndez
- Commune
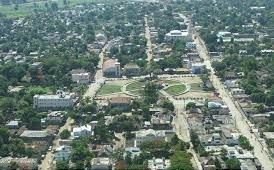
- Aerial view

- Location in Haiti
- Coordinates: 19°33′0″N 71°44′0″W
- Country: Haiti
- Department: Nord-Est
- Arrondissement: Ouanaminthe

Population (July, 2024)
  - Commune: 116,086
  - Urban: 100,503
- Time zone: UTC-05:00 (EST)
  - Summer (DST): UTC-04:00 (EDT)

Ouanaminthe (French pronunciation: [wanamɛ̃t]; Haitian Creole: Wanament or Wanamèt; Spanish: Juana Méndez) is a commune or town located in the Nord-Est department of Haiti. It lies along the Massacre River, which forms part of the border between Haiti and the Dominican Republic. Ouanaminthe is the largest commune of northeastern Haiti and of the Nord-Est Department. The bridge connecting Ouanaminthe to the Dominican city of Dajabón is one of the four main border crossings between the two countries. Throughout its history, the city has repeatedly been a site of mediation in international disputes, first between French and Spanish colonists, and in more modern times as part of the long-standing Haitian-Dominican conflict.

The population stands at roughly 100,000 people, including the immediate vicinity. Haitians living in Ouanaminthe are allowed to cross the border freely without documents two days per week, mainly for the market on Mondays and Fridays at Dajabón, where they buy and sell goods. In 2010, a new bridge and the new market store, funded by the European Union, was opened.

== Etymology ==
The name Ouanaminthe is the French form of the Taíno word Guanaminto, which was the reported pronunciation of the name of the indigenous village that preexisted European settlement on the present-day town site. The Haitian Creole form, Wanament, is simply the creolization of the French name. The Dominican Spanish form is Juana Méndez.

== Education ==
Ouanaminthe has many small schools. The majority of them belong to churches. Ouanaminthe has several elementary schools, including St-Francois Xavier, Collège de l'Etoile C.E.O, Collège Oswald Durant, Collège Georges Muller, St-Francois d'Assise, CFCP, Sur le Rocher and L'institution Univers congreganist schools. There are over 10 secondary schools, including a lycée, a public school, and a law school (public university). The Lycée Capois La Mort was located in the Anwobouk ri Èspanyòl, and has now moved to Sans. Haiti's educational system is constituted of four parts:

- Kindergarten
- Primaire / primary school (equivalent to the U.S.'s 1st through 6th grade)
- Secondaire / secondary school (equivalent to the U.S.'s 7th through 11th grade, plus Rheto and Philo)
- Université / university

Currently there are five new primary schools under construction, funded by Foi et Joie (Faith and Joy) under the patronage of Jesuit Refugee Service as well as Solidaridad Fronteriza.

The common local language is Creole (Kreyòl). Haiti's other official language, French, is also used.

Local travel is mainly by scooter or motorcycle. With the exception of the main streets, road surfaces are dirt, with numerous potholes. There is an intra-city bus station in town.

== Medical ==
Although both Ouanaminthe and Dajabon have 'hospitals', there is no indication of accreditation or hours. Unconfirmed reports are that sterilizing medical instruments is optional in this part of the world. IAMAT, Canadian and U.S. embassy lists of medical facilities have no entries within two hours drive of Ouanaminthe. Even then, vehicle travel at night may be more dangerous than local medical treatment. Local airports have short runways with no ILS instruments, making air ambulance evacuation impossible in marginal weather or at night. Border hours may delay land based evacuation to DR hospitals and airports. There is no '911' service, and no ambulance service exists in Haiti. The fire department runs an ambulance service in Dajabon. There are ongoing concerns about malaria and cholera.

== Economy ==
Canada has recently financed the renovation of the police station.

The town's primary economic activity is trade with neighboring Dajabon.

In 2015, seeking to combat contraband and encourage domestic production, Haiti banned the importation by truck of 23 items, including bottled drinking water and spaghetti.

== Sport ==
Ouanaminthe is home to the Ouanaminthe FC sports team.

== Transportation ==
The Route Nationale #6 connects Cap Haitien with Ouanaminthe and the Dominican border town of Dajabon via the towns Limonade and Terrier Rouge. Ouanaminthe is also served by the small Ouanaminthe Airport.

== Communal sections ==
The commune consists of five communal sections:

- Haut Maribahoux, rural
- Acul des Pins, rural
- Savane Longue, rural
- Savane au Lait, rural
- Gens de Nantes, rural

== Notable people ==
- Jean Alfred (1940–2015), Haitian Canadian teacher and politician, member of the National Assembly of Quebec
- Elisma Florvil, Lawyer, former Haitian Congressman, Former Judge of Ouanaminthe.
- Marie-Louise Coidavid (1778–1851), spouse of King Henri I
- Jean-Baptiste Dureau de la Malle (1742–1807), French writer and translator
