= Toussaint Louverture International Airport =

International airport in Tabarre, Haiti

Toussaint Louverture International Airport Aéroport International Toussaint Louverture Ayewopò Entènasyonal Tousen Louvèti

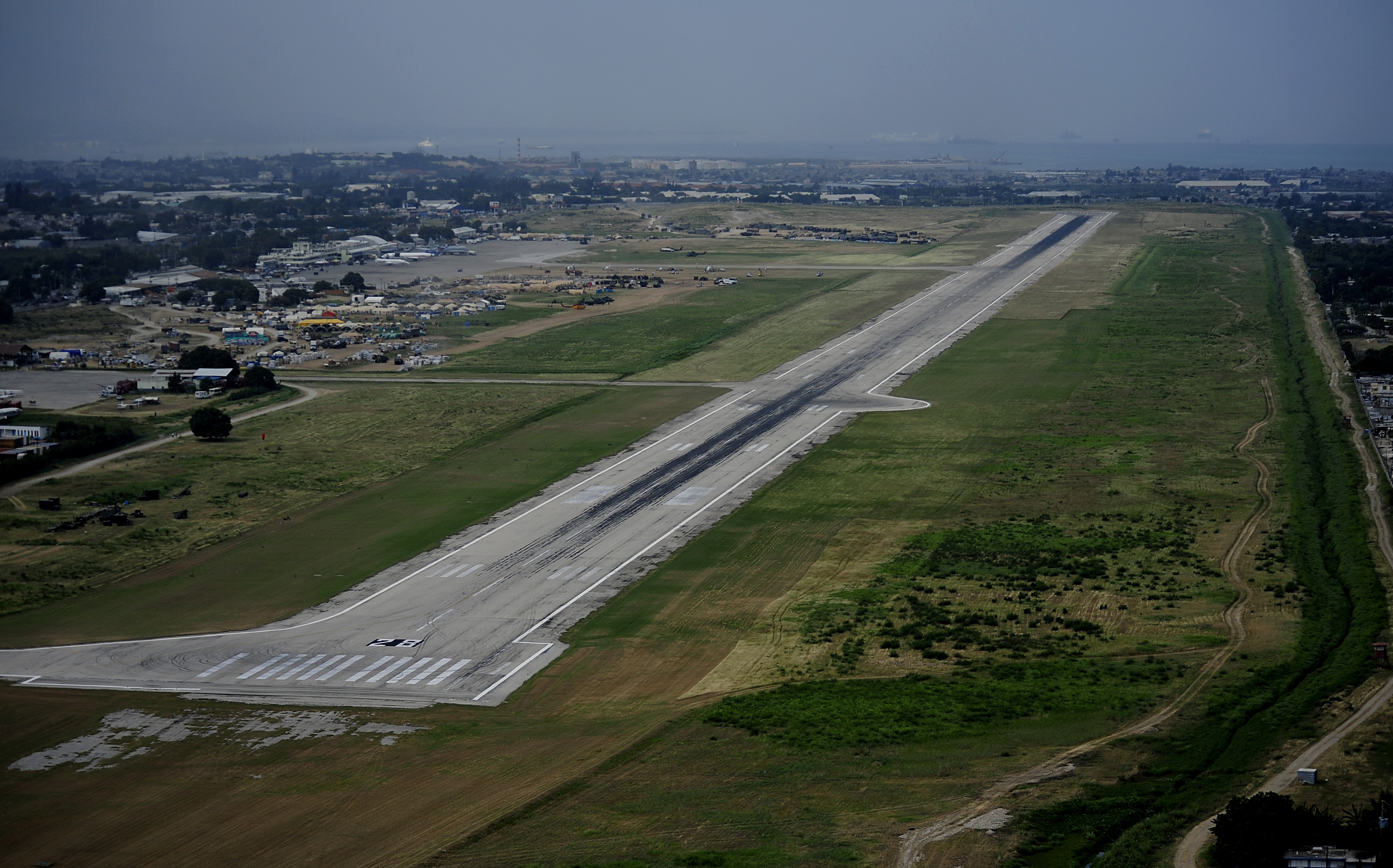
- IATA: PAP; ICAO: MTPP

Summary
- Airport type: Public
- Owner: Office National de l'Aviation Civile
- Operator: Autorité Aéroportuaire Nationale
- Serves: Port-au-Prince
- Location: Tabarre, Port-au-Prince, Ouest, HT
- Elevation AMSL: 98 ft (30 m)
- Coordinates: 18°34′31″N 72°17′42″W
- Website: pap.aan-haiti.com

Map
- Location within Haiti Location within North America

Runways
Direction	Length		Surface
Direction	m	ft	Surface
10/28	3,040	9,974	Asphalt

Statistics (2017)
- Passengers: 1,893,470
- Aircraft Operations: NA

Toussaint Louverture International Airport (Haitian Creole: Ayewopò Entènasyonal Tousen Louvèti, French: Aéroport International Toussaint Louverture) (IATA: PAP, ICAO: MTPP) is an international airport in Tabarre, a commune of Port-au-Prince in Haiti. The airport is an operating hub for Sunrise Airways. It is informally called "the Maïs-Gâté airport", named after the area in the Cul-de-Sac Plain where the airport was built.

== History ==
=== Foundation and early years ===
During the United States occupation of Haiti the United States Marine Corps stationed Marine Observation units using HS-1 and HS-2 aircraft in what later became Bowen Field (c. 1919).

In 1942, the USMC was sent to Haiti to build a facility to service Douglas O-38 aircraft used by Haiti Air Corps to observe Nazi German activity in the region. The USMC built Bowen Field (also known as Chancerelles Airport), a small civilian and military airport located near Chancerelles area near the Baie de Port-au-Prince. Bowen Field was used by Haiti Air Corps for mail (1943) and passenger (1944) services, then succeeded by the Compagnie haïtienne de transports aériens beginning in 1961. In the 1950s and the 1960s, it served as an airbase for the US military in Haiti. The current airport located further northeast of Bowen Field was developed with grant money from the US government and mostly money collected from Haitian people (taxes, lottery, etc.), opened as François Duvalier International Airport in 1965, after the Haitian president at the time, François "Papa Doc" Duvalier. The old Bowen field was decommissioned after 1994 and is now hosts Internally Displaced Persons Camp and Centre Sportif. The runway is now part of Avenue Haile Selassie.

=== Development since the 2000s ===
Duvalier's son and successor, Jean-Claude Duvalier, resigned in 1986. The airport was renamed Port-au-Prince International Airport. Haitian President Jean Bertrand Aristide renamed the airport again as Toussaint Louverture International Airport in 2003 to honor Toussaint Louverture, the leader of the Haitian Revolution.

The airport was badly damaged by the 2010 Haiti earthquake. On 25 November 2012, Haitian President Michel Joseph Martelly opened the newly repaired arrivals terminal.

On 7 July 2021, following the assassination of Haitian President Jovenel Moïse, the airport was closed and flights were sent back to their origins.

The airport was attacked by gangs alongside the March 2024 Haitian jailbreak, preventing acting Prime Minister Ariel Henry from returning to Haiti from overseas, and prompting the closure of the airport to commercial flights.

By May 2024, authorities had nationalized space around the perimeter of the airport and torn down 350 buildings to increase security. The US military began flying cargo planes into the airport on 23 April and by mid-May had transported over 500 tons of material, including equipment for the Haitian National Police. During this time, civilian flights remained suspended. The airport was reopened for civilian airliners on 20 May, with Haitian passenger airline Sunrise Airways and American cargo airline Amerijet restoring service to Miami.

The airport closed again due to gang violence in November 2024. Commercial operations resumed on 12 June 2025, with a domestic Sunrise Airways flight heading to Cap-Haitien.

On 23 November 2025, Sunrise Airways announced that all flights from and to Port-au-Prince are temporarily suspended following an incident that occurred the same day, when a company's aircraft was reportedly hit by bullets while taxiing on the tarmac.

== Facilities ==
=== Terminal ===
The main building of the airport works as the International Terminal. It is a two-story concrete and glass structure. Lounges and a few retail stores are on the second floor of the main building. Check-in counters, gates and immigration facilities are on the lower floor. The Guy Malary Terminal (named after former Haitian Justice Minister Guy Malary) is used for domestic flights. There are further buildings used for general aviation and cargo flights. The airport has three jet bridges, but most passengers walk onto aircraft from mobile stairs. The ramp area can handle 12 planes.

=== Expansion ===
The airport was to be re-designed completely by 2015. The re-making of the airport was to add 14 gates to the terminal and also will make the main passenger terminal bigger. As of 15 June 2016, a taxiway is under construction to increase traffic capacity, as taxiing aircraft currently must use the active runway to taxi to their takeoff position. Work is being performed by China National Automation Control System Corporation which has multiple large construction contracts with the Haitian government.

== Airlines and destinations ==
=== Passenger ===
As of March 2024, most flights are currently suspended due to the current political turmoil. The following airlines used to operate regular scheduled and charter services at the airport:

Airlines	Destinations
Air Transat	Montréal–Trudeau (suspended)
American Airlines	Miami (suspended)
JetBlue	New York–JFK (suspended)
Sunrise Airways	Antigua (suspended), Cap-Haïtien, Jacmel, Les Cayes, Punta Cana (suspended)

=== Cargo ===
Airlines	Destinations
Amerijet International	Miami (suspended)
IBC Airways	Miami

== Access ==
The airport can be accessed by car (with parking space next to the terminal building) or by National Bus Route 1.

== Accidents and incidents ==
- 8 September 1974: A Transportes Aéreos de Integración (TAISA) Curtiss C-46 Commando impacted a mountain near Port-au-Prince because of engine failure. All four occupants were killed.
- 3 March 1980: A Learjet (N211MB) operating on a corporate charter flight on behalf of 'Merchant Bank' crashed in the hills on arrival at airport. One passenger and two crew members died.
- 12 July 1980: A Douglas C-47 crashed on approach, killing all three people on board. The aircraft was being used illegally to transport marijuana.
- 15 September 1980, a JMG Inc. Douglas DC-6 ditched into the ocean because of three engines being shut down because of running out of oil. All four occupants died.
- 7 December 1995: An Air St. Martin Beechcraft 1900D aircraft (F-OHRK) hit a mountain at an altitude of 5,030 feet (1,533 m), 30 kilometres (19 mi) away from airport. Two crew members and 18 passengers (which were illegal immigrants to Guadeloupe) were killed.
- 12 February 1996: A Haiti Express GAF Nomad aircraft (N224E) crashed shortly after taking off. Two crew members and 8 passengers died.
- 31 August 2007: A Caribintair Cessna Grand Caravan (HH-CAR) crashed shortly after takeoff 5 kilometres (3 mi) away from the airport. There were no fatal injuries.
- 11 September 2007: Only eleven days after the previous accident another plane crash of a Caribintair Cessna Grand Caravan (HH-CAW) occurred near the airport, this time upon landing 10 kilometres (6 mi) short of the runway.
- 26 May 2013: A Brazilian Air Force KC-137 transport aircraft veered off the runway after an engine fire during takeoff, crashing into the grass next to the runway. The plane was carrying 121 Brazilian soldiers deployed to the UN stabilization force in Haiti (MINUSTAH) but no injuries were reported. Small aircraft were allowed to resume flying on Monday, but large aircraft that could not pass the KC-137 (mostly to/from the USA) were suspended for days.
- 11 November 2024: A Spirit Airlines A320neo (N966NK), originating from Ft Lauderdale, Florida, was grazed by gang-related gunfire. After aborting its approach, Flight 951 diverted safely to Cibao International Airport (STI), Santiago, Dominican Republic. Crew onboard the aircraft were grazed by light arm fire but sustained no serious injuries. The aircraft was inspected, and damage was found to be consistent with arms fire. It is grounded in STI. Spirit, American Airlines and JetBlue suspended service to the airport before the Federal Aviation Administration ordered all US carriers to avoid Haitian airspace for the next 30 days.

== See also ==
- Jacmel Airport, another airport used for 2010 earthquake relief flights in Haiti
- Operation Unified Response, US military relief effort for the January 2010 earthquake in Haiti
- List of airports in Haiti
- List of the busiest airports in the Caribbean
