= Cap-Haïtien International Airport =

Airport in Haiti

Cap-Haïtien International Airport: Ayewopò Entènasyonal Kap Ayisyen; Aéroport Internationale de Cap-Haïtien
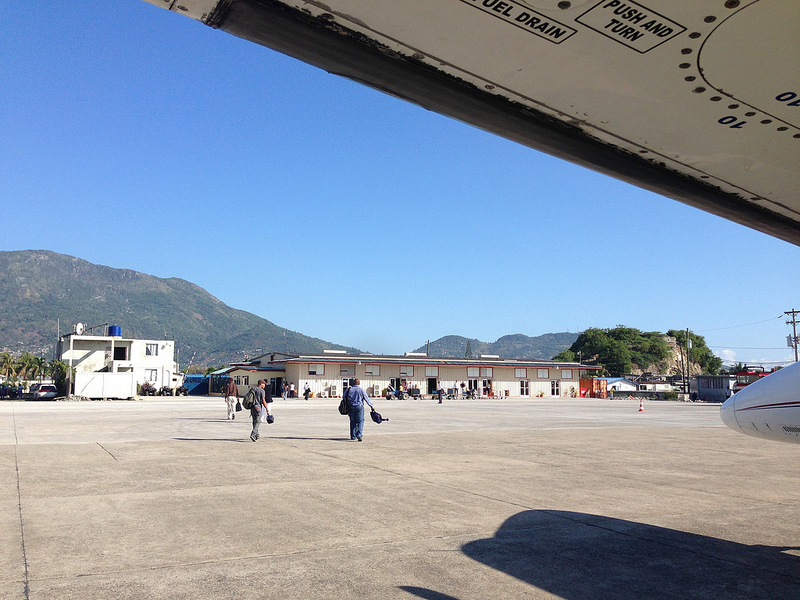
- IATA: CAP; ICAO: MTCH

Summary
- Airport type: Public
- Owner: Office National de l'Aviation Civile
- Operator: Autorité Aéroportuaire Nationale
- Serves: Cap-Haïtien, Haiti
- Elevation AMSL: 10 ft (3.0 m)
- Coordinates: 19°43′59″N 72°11′41″W
- Website: cap.aan-haiti.com

Map
- Location in Haiti

Runways
Direction	Length		Surface
Direction	m	ft	Surface
05/23	2,652	8,701	Asphalt
- Sources: DAFIF

Cap-Haïtien International Airport (IATA: CAP, ICAO: MTCH) (Haitian Creole: Ayewopò Entènasyonal Kap Ayisyen, French: Aéroport International de Cap-Haïtien) is a minor international airport serving Cap-Haïtien, a city in Nord, Haiti. It is the second largest airport in Haiti. This airport connects Haiti to airports like Miami International Airport, Providenciales International Airport, Cibao International Airport, and among others in the Caribbean region. The last airport for refueling for general aviation coming from the Bahamas into Haiti is Inagua Airport, located in Great Inagua, located at Matthew Town (IATA: IGA, ICAO: MYIG).

== History ==
The Haitian government signed a deal with Venezuela for the airport to be renovated. On 13 September 2010, a 1,300 m (4,265 ft) concrete runway was being built by Haitian firms and personnel working under the supervision of a Cuban-Venezuelan firm. The extended 7,500 ft runway was completely repaved in October 2012, with the rest of the reconstruction finished by February 2013. Part of the work consisted of rerouting a road around the airstrip that had previously bisected it.

On 18 April 2013, a spokesman for Haitian Prime Minister Laurent Lamothe announced that the airport will be renamed to "Hugo Chávez International Airport" in honour of the late Venezuelan President, a day before Haitian President Michel Martelly was scheduled to attend Nicolás Maduro's inauguration ceremony in Caracas. A statement by the Prime Minister's spokesman Gary Bodeau said "President Chávez has done his best to help Haiti in the most difficult times. He has contributed over $1 billion to assist Haiti and is beloved by the Haitian people. As a tribute to him, and for his work to Haiti, we have decided to name the airport in Cap-Haïtien in his honor."

In 2019, Spirit Airlines cancelled its scheduled service between Cap-Haïtien and Fort Lauderdale. In 2020, American Airlines terminated its service to Miami, leaving Cap-Haïtien with no scheduled commercial passenger service to the United States. On 1 October 2020, Spirit Airlines announced it would resume nonstop service to Fort Lauderdale-Hollywood International Airport beginning 3 December 2020.

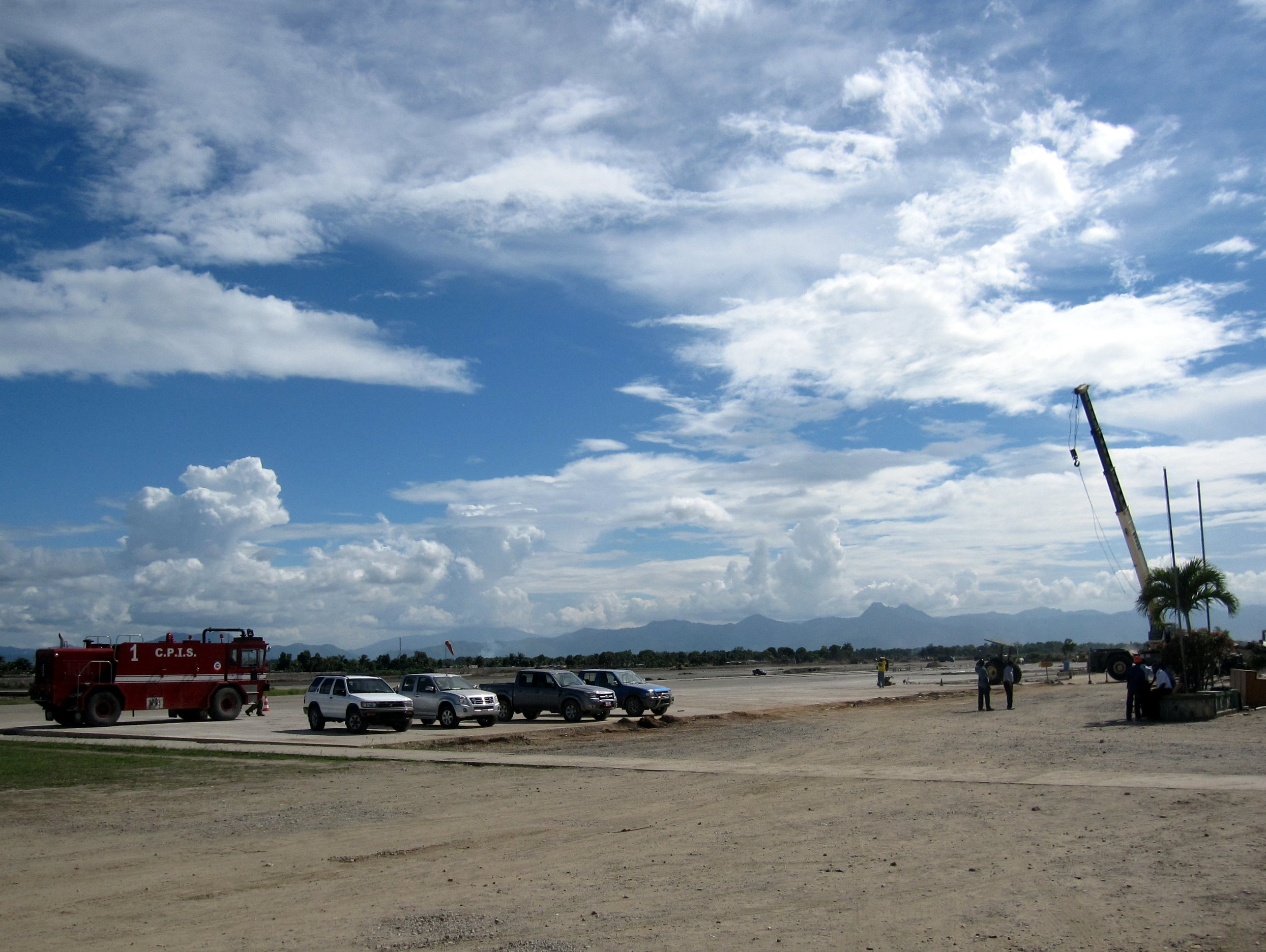
Cap-Haïtien International Airport under construction in October 2012

== Facilities ==
The airport resides at an elevation of 10 ft (3 m) above mean sea level. It had previously one runway designated 05/23 with an asphalt surface measuring 1,489 m × 40 m (4,885 ft × 131 ft). The runway was extended to 2,286 m (7,500 ft) and completely repaved in a two-year reconstruction that finished in February 2013, with the actual runway opening in October 2012, although the change was not immediately made on the DAFIF database.

== Airlines and destinations ==
The following airlines operate regular scheduled and charter services at the airport:

Airlines	Destinations
American Airlines	Miami
Sunrise Airways	Boston, Fort Lauderdale, Les Cayes, Miami, New York–JFK, Pointe-à-Pitre, Providenciales, St. Maarten
