= Transport in Haiti =

All of the major transportation systems in Haiti are located near or run through the capital, Port-au-Prince.

== Roads ==
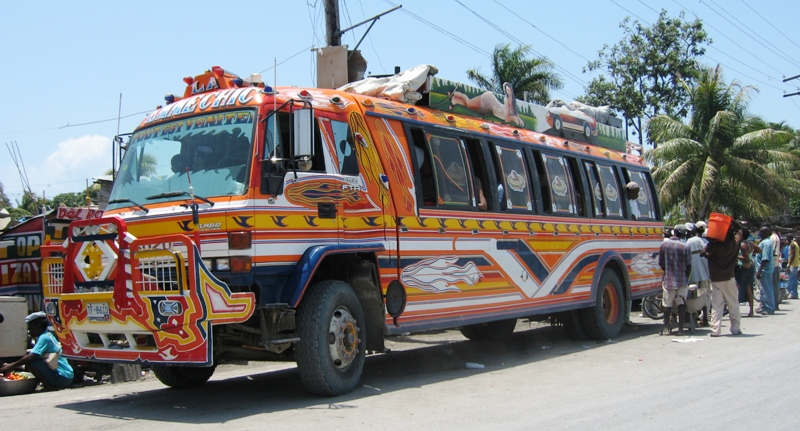
A "tap tap" bus, used for public transportation in Haiti

Haiti's network of roads consists of National Roads, Department Roads, and county roads. The hub of the road network is located at the old airport (at the intersection of Boulevard Jean-Jacques Dessalines and Autoroute de Delmas). From this intersection, Route Nationale #1 and Route Nationale #2 commence.

- Route Nationale #1 (RN1) heads north, passing through Saint-Marc and Gonaïves to its terminus at Rue 22 in Cap-Haïtien.
- Route Nationale #2 (RN2) is commonly known as “Boulevard Jean-Jacques Dessalines” within Port-au-Prince and as “Route du Sud” outside the capital region. After heading south through downtown Port-au-Prince, it travels west through the capital's western boroughs and then through Petit-Goâve and Aquin to its terminus at Avenue des Quatre Chemins in Les Cayes. (However, its “extension” continues southwest almost to the sea south of Port Salut.)
- Route Nationale #3 (RN3) begins where RN1 heads northwest from Bon Repos, not far north of the road network's hub. RN3 travels northeast, traversing the Plateau Centrale via Mirebalais and Hinche before finally re-joining RN1 in Cap-Haïtien. It was built in successive sections up to the late 2010s, receiving support from the European Union.
- Route Nationale #4 (RN4) branches off from RN2 at Carrefour du Fort Léogâne, not far south of Léogâne. Commonly known as “Route de l’Amitié”, RN4 climbs and descends the Chaîne de la Selle mountain range on its meandering southward course to its terminus in the centre of Jacmel.
- Route Nationale #5 (RN5) breaks off from RN1 on the northeast edge of Gonaïves, heading north and then northwest through Gros Morne before terminating near the airport outside Port-de-Paix.
- Route Nationale #6 (RN6) branches off from RN3 just as it is about to enter Cap-Haïtien from the south. RN6 heads southeast toward the Dominican border through Terrier Rouge en route to Ouanaminthe. Its terminus is the bridge over the Massacre River.
- Route Nationale #7 (RN7) commences from the aforementioned Avenue des Quatre Chemins in Les Cayes, going northwest across Haiti's southern arm to the outskirts of Jérémie.
- Route Nationale #8 (RN8) is by far the shortest of the National Roads. It breaks off RN1 at Carrefour Shada in Croix-des-Missions. Heading east, it passes through Croix-des-Bouquets, skirts the southern shore of Étang Saumâtre, and terminates at the Malpasse border crossing with the Dominican Republic.

Maintenance for RN1 and RN2 lapsed after the 1991 coup, prompting the World Bank to loan US$50 million that was designated for road repairs. The project was cancelled in January 1999. The World Bank, who reasoned that the cancellation of those projects would ruin Haiti's road infrastructure progress created the FER (Fond d’Entretien Routier) in 2003. This was a way to cut down corruption, get local companies involved, and in restraining any stopping of these projects because of political instability or protests. President Rene Preval, on his campaign for his second term, vowed on his Maillages Routiers to rebuild the majority of these roads that had disintegrated rapidly and build new ones that would enable the country to move forward. When he wasn't able to get the funds from the World Bank, he pleaded to the international donors for assistance, which was heavily criticized by many politicians in the media, but was greatly embraced by a population desperate to see road infrastructure development come to their towns. Therefore, the European Union pledged to help build RN6, then RN3. In the meantime, the World Bank loaned Haiti US$200 Million to rebuild RN2, from River Froide, which is the starting point of RN2, all the way to Aquin and repair RN1 from Titanyen to Cap-Haïtien. The hurricane season of 2008 was a major setback in development, since many bridges in multiple areas had either collapse or suffered extensive damage and was in immediate need of repair. Most of those work on RN1 and RN2, that were already halted, suffered a major setback during the earthquake of January 12, 2010. For the construction of RN7, Canada pledged US$75 million and the IDB US$31 million for the construction of RN7, which started in 2009. It, too, suffered major setbacks because of the January 12 earthquake.

=== Statistics ===
- Total highways: 6,045 km
- Paved highways: 2,971 km
- Unpaved highways: 3,071 km (2011 est.)

=== Public transportation ===
The public transportation is mostly privately owned in Haiti. In the past, it was controlled by private individuals. However, with the advent of new generation of entrepreneurs, public transportation in Haiti has become more publicly funded. The most common form of public transportation in Haiti is the use of brightly painted pickup trucks as taxis called "tap-taps". They are named this because when a passenger needs to be let off, they use their change to tap the side of the vehicle to tell the driver to stop the bus. Most tap-taps are fairly priced at around 10-15 gourdes per ride within a city. The catch to the price is that the driver will often fill a truck to maximum capacity, which is typically 20-30 people. The government has made significant efforts to re-structure the public transportation system in Haiti. It has attempted several times to bring BUS. In 1979, it was the BUS called CONATRA, which was a contract between the government and a driver’s association. This agreement quickly failed because of sabotage from the different parties and due to poor maintenance of the buses. In 1998, another attempt was made with the Service Plus and Dignite for students and teachers. Sabotage, poor maintenance and the overthrow of President Aristide in 2004 had severely undermined the effort. After President Preval was re-elected in 2006, another effort was made to repair the majority of the buses remaining in Haiti. 300 new buses were also donated from Taiwan to Haiti in an effort to bring back Service Plus in association of the drivers. Mini-vans are frequently used to connect towns close to Port-au-Prince, such as Pétion-Ville, Jacmel, and Leogane. Today, motorcycles, as well as planes, are widely used as forms of private transportation throughout the island.

== Water transport ==
The port at Port-au-Prince, Port international de Port-au-Prince, has more registered shipping than any of the over one dozen other ports in the country. Its facilities include cranes, large berths, and warehouses, but these facilities are in universally poor shape. The port is under-used, possibly due to the substantially higher port fees compared to ports in the Dominican Republic.

The port of Saint-Marc is currently the preferred port of entry for consumer goods entering Haiti. Reasons for this may include its location away from volatile and congested Port-au-Prince, as well as its central location relative to a large number of Haitian cities, including Cap-Haïtien, Carrefour, Delmas, Desarmes, Fonds-Parisien, Fort-Liberté, Gonaïves, Hinche, Artibonite, Limbe, Pétion-Ville, Port-de-Paix, and Verrettes. These cities, together with their surrounding areas, contain about six million of Haiti's eight million people.

The islands of Île-à-Vâche, Île de la Tortue, Petite and Grand Cayemite, Grosse Caye, and Île de la Gonâve are reachable only by ferry or small sailing boat (except for Île de la Gonâve, which has an airstrip that is rarely used). The majority of towns near the coast of Haiti are also accessible primarily by small sailing boats. Such boats are usually cheaper and more available than is public ground transportation, which is commonly limited to trucks loaded with merchandise and passengers on market days.

Haiti has 150 km of navigable waterways.

=== Ports and harbors ===
Cap-Haïtien, Gonaïves, Jacmel, Jérémie, Les Cayes, Miragoâne, Port-au-Prince, Port-de-Paix, Saint-Marc, Fort-Liberté

=== History ===
Haiti has one of the oldest maritime histories in the Americas. The Panama Canal Railway Company ran a shipping line with three ocean liners that traveled between New York City (US) — Port-au-Prince (Haiti) — Cristobal (Panama). The company had facilities in Port-au-Prince and their ocean liners stopped there. The three ocean liners were SS Panama (maiden voyage 26 April 1939), SS Ancon (maiden voyage 22 June 1939) and SS Cristobal (maiden voyage 17 August 1939).

== Aviation ==
International flights fly from Toussaint Louverture International Airport (formerly known as Port-au-Prince International Airport), which opened in 1965 (as François Duvalier International Airport), and is located 10 km north/north east of Port-au-Prince. It is Haiti's only jetway, and as such, handles the vast majority of the country's international flights. Air Haïti, Tropical Airways and a handful of major airlines from Europe, the Caribbean, and the Americas serve the airport.

Domestic flights are available through Sunrise Airways which is Haiti's largest airline for the general public offering scheduled, as well as, charter flights. Another domestic company is, Mission Aviation Fellowship catering to non-Catholic registered Christians.

=== Statistics ===
Airports

- 14 (2007 est.)

Airports - with paved runways

- total: 5
- 2,438 to 3,047 m: 2
- 914 to 1,523 m: 3 (2009 est.)

Airports - with unpaved runways

- total: 10
- 914 to 1,523 m: 1
- under 914 m: 8 (2007 est.)

== Railroads ==
Railroads ran in Haiti Between 1876 and 1991. Haiti was the first country in the Caribbean with a railway system, in the urban area of Port-au-Prince and later a project that was supposed to be run by The McDonald company from Port-au-Prince to Cap-Haïtien, and from Port-au-Prince to Les Cayes, however it was not completed. Most of the disoperation of the railroad in Haiti is due to bankruptcy and closure of the company who supported the construction of the railroad.
