= Autorité Aéroportuaire Nationale =

Agency overview
- Jurisdiction: Haiti
- Headquarters: Tabarre, Haiti
- Agency executive: Irving Mehu, Director General
- Website: www.aan.gouv.ht

The Autorité Aéroportuaire Nationale (AAN) is a government agency responsible for operating Haitian commercial airports. AAN ensures the creation, extension, management, operation and installation of airport facilities and civil aerodromes throughout the Haitian territory. Its main office is located on Boulevard Toussaint Louverture in Tabarre, Haiti.

== History ==
In the late 1970s, due to the growth of air transport in Haiti, dictator Jean-Claude Duvalier agreed to establish an autonomous body to ensure the extension, management and operation of civilian airport facilities and civilian aerodromes in the Republic. Thus, by decrees, an autonomous body of unlimited duration was established, enjoying its complete technical and financial autonomy and having its own legal responsibility.
