= 49th Legislature of the Haitian Parliament =

This is a list of the 129 members of the 49th Parliament of Haiti, elected in the 2010-2011 election.

== List of members ==
=== Senate ===
==== Delegation from Artibonite Department ====
Senator (and position)	Party	Expiration of term
Youri Latortue	LAAA	2012
(vacant, due to death of Noël Emmanuel Limage)	none	none
François Fouchard Bergromme	LAAA	2008

==== Delegation from Centre Department ====
Senator (and position)	Party	Expiration of term
Edmonde Supplice Beauzile	FUSION	2012
Jean Wilbert Jacques	LESPWA	2010
(vacant, due to resignation of Ultimo Compère)	none	none

==== Delegation from Grand'Anse Department ====
Senator (and position)	Party	Expiration of term
Michel Clérié	FUSION	2012
Andris Riché (vice-president)	OPL	2010
Jean Maxime Roumer	LESPWA	2008

==== Delegation from Nippes Department ====
Senator (and position)	Party	Expiration of term
Nenel Cassy	LESPWA	2012
Jean Joseph Pierre Louis	OPL	2010
Huguette Lamour	FUSION	2008

==== Delegation from Nord Department ====
Senator (and position)	Party	Expiration of term
Kely Bastien (president)	LESPWA	2012
Cemephise Gilles	LESPWA	2010
Antoine René Samson	LESPWA	2008

==== Delegation from Nord-Est Department ====
Senator (and position)	Party	Expiration of term
(vacant, due to resignation of Rudolph H. Boulos of FUSION)	none	none
Judnel Jean (2nd secretary)	FUSION	2010
Jean Rodolphe Joazile	PONT	2008

==== Delegation from Nord-Ouest Department ====
Senator (and position)	Party	Expiration of term
Eddy Bastien (1st secretary)	ALYANS	2012
Evallière Beauplan	PONT	2010
2010
2014

==== Delegation from Ouest Department ====
Senator (and position)	Party	Expiration of term
Anacacis Jean Hector	LESPWA	2012
Rudy Hérivaux	LAVALAS	2010
Evelyne Cheron	LAVALAS	2008

==== Delegation from Sud Department ====
Senator (and position)	Party	Expiration of term
Yvon Buissereth	LESPWA	2012
Fritz Carlos Lebon (Quaestor)	UNION	2010
Fortuné Jean Gabriel	UNION	2008

==== Delegation from Sud-Est Department ====
Senator (and position)	Party	Expiration of term
Joseph Lambert	LESPWA	2012
Laurent Fequière Mathurin	LESPWA	2010
Ricard Pierre	OPL	2008

=== Chamber of Deputies ===
==== Delegation from Artibonite Department ====
Deputy (and position)	Constituency	Party
Jean Pressoir Dort	Dessalines: 1st circ. Dessalines	LAAA
Astrel Gustinvil	Dessalines: 2ème. circ. Pte. Rivière de l'Artibonite	LAAA
Hubert Alsace	Dessalines: 3ème. circ. Grande Saline	LESPWA
Levaillant Louis Jeune	Dessalines: 4ème. circ. Desdunes	FUSION
Arsène Dieujuste	Gonaives: 1ère circ. Gonaives	MOCHRENA
Eliphète Noël	Gonaives: 2ème circ. L'Estère	ALYANS
Cholzer Chancy (Quaestor)	Gonaives: 3ème circ. Ennery	LAAA
Gerandal Télusma (1st secretary)	Gros Morne: 1ère circ. Gros Morne	MOCHRENA
Edmond Dorméus	Gros Morne: 2ème circ. Anse Rouge et Terre Neuve	RDNP
Patrick Joseph	Marmelade: unique circ. Marmelade et St Michel	LESPWA
Yves Joseph Cajuste	Saint Marc: 1ère. circ. St. Marc	LESPWA
Jean Beaubois Dorsonne	St. Marc: 2ème circ. Verrettes	LAAA
Alix Pierre Macajou	St. Marc: 3ème circ La Chapelle	LAAA

==== Delegation from Centre Department ====
Deputy	Constituency	Party
Nicson Dorestil	Cerca la Source: unique circ. Cerca la Source et Thomassique	LESPWA
Louis-Marie Daniel	Hinche: 1ere. circ. Hinche	Tèt Ansanm
Enel Appolon	Hinche: 2ème circ. Thomonde	LESPWA
Willot Joseph	Hinche: 3ème. circ. Maïssade	ALYANS
A. Rodon Bien-Aimé	Hinche: 4ème circ. Cerca Carvajal et le quartier de Los Palis	MPH
Charlemagne Denaud	Lascahobas: 1ère circ. Lascahobas	OPL
Lutherking E. Marcadieu	Lascahobas: 2ème circ. Belladère	OPL
Joseph Noël Louis	Lascahobas: 3ème circ. Savanette et le quartier de Baptiste	KOMBA
Jean-Claude Lubin	Mirebalais: 1ère circ. Mirebalais et Boucan Carré	LESPWA
Smith Romial	Mirebalais: 2ème circ. Saut d'Eau	MPH

==== Delegation from Grand'Anse Department ====
Deputy	Constituency	Party
Orélien Joachim	Anse d'Hainault: 1ère circ. Anse d'Hainault et les Irois	OPL
Jean Acluche Louis Jeune	Anse d'Hainault: 2ème circ. Dame Marie	OPL
Nicolas Decosse	Corail: 1ème circ. Corail et Roseaux	FUSION
Ronald Etienne	Corail: 2ème circ. Pestel et Beaumont	FRN
Mercier Ysidor	Jérémie: 1ère circ. Jérémie	RDNP
Jean Rigaud Bélizaire	Jérémie: 2ème circ. Abricot et Bonbon	OPL
Sorel Jacinthe	Jérémie: 3ème circ. Moron et Chamberllan	FUSION

==== Delegation from Nippes Department ====
Deputy	Constituency	Party
Jean Robert Malbranche	Anse à Veau: 1ère circ. Anse à Veau et d’Arnaud	FUSION
Frantz-Robert Monde	Anse à Veau	FUSION
Lamy Pressoir Germain	Anse à Veau: 3ème circ. Petit-Trou de Nippes et Plaisance du Sud	FUSION
Casimir Michelet	Baradères: unique circ. Baradères et Grand Boucan	OPL
Poly Faustin	Miragoâne: 1ère circ. Miragoâne et Fonds des Nègres	LAVALAS
Laurore Edouard	Miragoâne: 2ème circ. Petite Rivière de Nippes et Paillant	UNION

==== Delegation from Nord Department ====
Deputy	Constituency	Party
Lorius Joseph	Acul du Nord: 1ère circ. Acul du Nord	JPDN
Marijosie Etienne	Acul du Nord: 2ème circ. Plaine du Nord et Milot	PLH
Pierre Richard Jadotte	Borgne: unique circ. Borgne et Port-Margot	LESPWA
Eddie Jean-Pierre	Cap Haitien: 1ère circ. Cap-Haitien	MIRN
Huge Célestin	Cap Haitien: 2ème circ. Limonade et Quartier Morin	LESPWA
Clébert Dorvil	Grande Rivière du Nord: unique circ. Grande-Rivière du Nord et Bahon	OPL
Félius Lubin	Limbé: unique circ. Limbé et Bas-Limbé	UNITE
Alcine Audné	Plaisance: 1ère circ. Plaisance	LESPWA
Georges Espady	Plaisance: 2ème circ. Pilate	LESPWA
Bener Sissoir	Saint Raphael: 1ère circ. Saint Raphael et Dondon	MPH
Hudson Nelson	Saint Raphael: 2ème circ. Pignon, Ranquitte et La Victoire	ALYANS

==== Delegation from Nord-Est Department ====
Deputy	Constituency	Party
Miolin Charles Pierre	Fort-Liberté: unique circ. Fort-Liberté, Ferrier et Perches	LESPWA
Joseph Saintilma	Ouanaminthe: 1ère circ. Ouanaminthe	FUSION
Ronald Larêche	Ouanaminthe: 2ème circ. Mont-Organisé et Capotille	FUSION
Donald Dorsainvil	Trou du Nord: 1ère circ. Trou du Nord et Caracol	FUSION
Pierrogène Davilmar	Trou du Nord: 2ème circ. Ste Suzanne	LESPWA
Enos Pierre	Trou du Nord: 3ème circ. Terrier Rouge	ALYANS
Jean Berthole Bastien	Vallières: unique circ. Vallières, Carice et Mombrun Crochu	FUSION

==== Delegation from Nord-Ouest Department ====
Deputy	Constituency	Party
Eloune Doréus (vice-president)	Môle Saint Nicolas: 1ère circ. Môle Saint Nicolas	OPL
Vasco Thernela	Môle Saint Nicolas: 2ème circ. Bombardopolis et Baie de Henne	OPL
Théramène Gérard	Môle Saint Nicolas: 3ème circ. Jean Rabel	KOMBA
F. Lucas Sainvil	Port-de-Paix: 1ère circ. Port-de-Paix	LESPWA
Denis Saint Fort	Port-de-Paix: 2ème circ. Bassin Bleu et Chansolme	ALYANS
M. Antoine François	Port-de-Paix: 3ème circ. La Tortue	FUSION
A. Clovel Richmond	Saint Louis du Nord: unique circ. Saint Louis du Nord et Anse à Foleur	MIRN

==== Delegation from Ouest Department ====
Deputy	Constituency	Party
Julien P. Féquière	Arcahaie: 1ère circ Arcahaie	UNION
P. Jerôme Valciné	Arcahaie: 2ème circ Cabaret	LAVALAS
Clunie Dumay	Croix des Bouquets: 1ère circ Croix des Bouquets et Thomazeau	UNION
Gasner Douze	Croix des Bouquets: 3ème circ Circ de Cornillon	FUSION
P. Judes Destiné	Croix des Bouquets: 2ème circ Fonds Verrettes et Ganthier	MODEREH
Elou Fleurine	La Gonave: circ. unique Anse-à-Galets et Pointe-à-Raquette	FUSION
Claudy Ganthier	Léogâne: 1ère circ Léogâne	Lespwa
Jean Marcel Lumérant	Léogâne: 3ème circ Circ. de Grand-Goâve	ALYANS
Jonas Coffy	Port-au-Prince: 1ère circ Zone Nord (1)	LAVALAS
Saurel François	Port-au-Prince: 2ème circ. Zone Est (2)	LAVALAS
Jean Clédor Myrthil	Port-au-Prince: 3ème circ. Zone Sud (3)	LESPWA
Steven I. Benoit (2nd secretary)	Port-au-Prince: 4ème circ. Pétion-Ville	LESPWA
Lesly Fanfan	Port-au-Prince: 5ème circ. Kenscoff	
Pierre Eric Jean-Jacques (president)	Port-au-Prince: 6ème circ. Delmas et Tabarre	LESPWA
Webster Rodrigue Maurice	Port-au-Prince: 7ème circ. Cité Soleil	INDEP.
Esdras Fabien	Port-au-Prince: 8ème circ. Carrefour	LESPWA

==== Delegation from Sud Department ====
Deputy	Constituency	Party
Emmanuel .G. Bourjolly	Aquin: 1ère circ. Aquin	FUSION
Félix Jean Mervius	Aquin: 2ème circ. Cavaillon et St Louis du Sud	FUSION
Jean David Génesté	Cayes: 1ère circ. Cayes et l'Ile à Vaches	ALYANS
Guy Gérard Georges	Cayes: 2ème circ. Torbeck et de Chantal	UNION
Olguine Pierre	Cayes: 3ème circ. Camp Perrin et de Maniche	UNION
Jean Galvy Charles	Chardonnières: 1ère circ. Chardonnières et les Anglais	UNION
Aristhène Dénizé	Chardonnières: 2ème circ. Tiburon et le quartier de la Cahôanne	ALYANS
Astral Dolné	Côteaux: 1ère circ. Coteaux	MPH
Julner Lainé	Côteaux: 3ème circ. Port à Piment	OPL
P. Richard Olivard	Côteaux: 2ème circ. Roche à Bateaux	LAVALAS
Joseph Nelson Pierre-Louis	Port-Salut: 1ère circ. Port-Salut	ALYANS
Jean Roland Boisrond	Port-Salut: 2ème circ. St Jean du Sud et d'Arniquet	LAVALAS

==== Delegation from Sud-Est Department ====
Deputy	Constituency	Party
Malherbe François	Bainet: 1ère circ. Bainet	LESPWA
Guivard Cadet Monval	Bainet: 2ème circ. Côtes de Fer	KOMBA
Maxeau Baltazar	Belle Anse: 1ère circ. Belle Anse	RNDP
Patrick Robasson	Belle Anse: 3ème circ. Anse à Pitre	LESPWA
Camille Desmarattes	Belle Anse: 2ème circ. Thiotte et Grand Gosier	FUSION
Patrick Domond	Jacmel: 1ère circ. Jacmel et le Quartier de Marbial	LESPWA
Jean Etzer Valentin	Jacmel: 2ème circ. La Vallée de Jacmel	LESPWA
Jean Delouis Félix	Jacmel: 3ème circ. Marigot et Cayes-Jacmel	LESPWA
