= Baptiste, Centre =

Baptiste
- Commune
- Location in Haiti
- Coordinates: 18°48′00″N 71°47′00″W
- Country: Haiti
- Department: Centre
- Arrondissement: Lascahobas

Population (2015 est.)
  - Total: 2,783

Baptiste (French pronunciation: [batist]) is a commune in the Lascahobas Arrondissement, in the Centre department of Haiti. The town was made a commune by presidential decree on 22 July 2015.
