= Jean-Baptiste Chavannes (agronomist) =

Haitian agronomist (born 1947)

Jean-Baptiste Chavannes (born 1947 in Haiti) is an agronomist from Haiti.

== Biography ==
Chavannes founded the Papaye Peasant Movement (MPP) in 1973 to teach Haitian principles of sustainable agriculture. The MPP has become one of the most effective peasant movements of Haiti's history, succeeding in terms of economic development, environmental protection and the survival of each.

Chavannes continues his work despite the political climate in Haiti, which remains unstable. He has been exposed to several assassination attempts during periods of political destabilization in Haiti. Death threats have forced into exile between 1993 and 1994. He received the Goldman Environmental Prize in 2005.

== See also ==
- Haitian Heritage Museum
- Papaye peasant movement
- Sustainable development
- Sustainable food system
- Sustainable landscaping
