= Lascahobas =

Lascahobas Laskawobas
- Commune
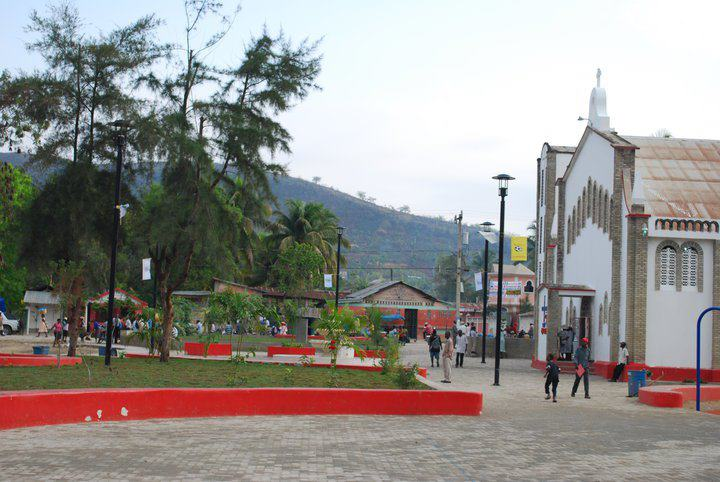
- Interactive map of Lascahobas
- Location in Haiti
- Coordinates: 18°49′46″N 71°56′11″W
- Country: Haiti
- Department: Centre
- Arrondissement: Lascahobas
- Settled: 1763

Area
  - Total: 151.68 km^{2} (58.56 sq mi)
- Elevation: 250 m (820 ft)

Population (2015)
  - Total: 45,873
  - Density: 302.43/km^{2} (783.30/sq mi)
- Time zone: UTC−05:00 (EST)
  - Summer (DST): UTC−04:00 (EDT)
- Postal code: HT 5310

Lascahobas (French pronunciation: [laskaɔbas]; Haitian Creole: Laskawobas; Spanish: Las Caobas) is a commune located in the Centre department of Haiti, roughly one hour east of Mirebalais, 10 minutes south of Lac de Peligre, and one hour west of the border with the Dominican Republic.

The population is about 45,873 people, as of 2015.

== History and character ==
Lascahobas is the market town of a rural, agricultural area. Outlying villages in the area include Cohoroes, Rantamoulie, LaHoye, and Pouly (also spelled Poulie or Poule), Flande, and Pareidon. The city and villages surrounding it have been the focus of missionary work by the Episcopal Church in the early 21st Century.

It was founded as Las Caobas by Spanish colonists in 1763.

== Economy ==
Primarily agricultural, with a bustling local market and a large Roman Catholic church, the city sits on the significant Lascahobas River.

The wealthiest business in town are agriculture development and farming.

Lascahobas has an Episcopal church, St. Esprit (Holy Spirit), which also has a school. As of early 2013, the Rector of the Church of the Holy Spirit was The Rev. Jean Milor Medela; Fr. Medela also serves as priest at the Church of the Ascension in Poulie. As of October 2016 they were replaced by Fr. Jean Jacques Deravil.

The 2010 Haiti earthquake damaged some parts of Lascahobas, but didn't affect the ongoing installment of solar panels for electricity. In 2011, volunteers from the United States installed solar panels to allow for Internet connections. Installation was completed in early 2013.

== Tourism ==
Vodou festivals occur regularly throughout much of the year in the surrounding hills.

Mon Fo, located on the west edge of town is the highest elevation in the area, that at some point was used as a military fort. All that remains of the fort are crumbling ruins of walls and a large cannon with a Fleur de Lis.

Carnival is celebrated annually in the whole town.

== Transportation ==
Lascahobas is bisected by Route 305.

== Education ==
There are two primary schools, one Roman Catholic and one Episcopal, in Lascahobas. Each of the four outlying villages also has a primary school operated by the Episcopal church. The newest schools are in Poulie and Flande. There are no secondary schools nor public schools in the area.
