= Charles Philippe Jean-Pierre =

Charles Philippe Jean-Pierre (born in Chicago, Illinois) is a Washington DC–based painter, who is known for his contemporary and traditional Haitian paintings as well as international street murals, collage work, and portraiture. According to East City Art, Jean-Pierre was a 2015 White House invitee for the role of art education in promoting national youth justice. Jean-Pierre currently serves as an art instructor for City Arts DC and is the National Art Director for Young & Powerful for President Barack Obama.

Jean Pierre is an adjunct instructor at American University fine arts department. He is on the board of directors of Diaspora African Women's Network (DAWN).

== Education ==
He received his Masters of Arts from Howard University, where he honed his bold and introspective painting style.

== Work ==
Jean-Pierre's work centers around themes of beauty, power structures, feminism, masculinity, and race. Although he works in a variety of mediums, he most often creates acrylic paintings.

== Murals ==
According to the Rush Philanthropic Arts Foundation, Jean-Pierre has created public artworks in Chicago, DC, Istanbul, Panama, Port-au-Prince, London, and Paris. Here is a list of them below:

- Bronzeville Noir, 47th St. and Calumet St., Chicago, Illinois, 2012?
- Holy Rosary Roman Catholic Church, Third St. NW, Washington, D.C., 2013

== Exhibitions ==
- Les Jacmeliens IV, the Haitian Heritage Museum, Miami, Florida, December, 2014
