= Cerca-la-Source Arrondissement =

Coordinates: 19.1667°N 71.7833°W

Cerca-la-Source Arrondissement Arrondissement de Cerca-la-Source Awondisman Sèka Lasous
- Arrondissement
- Interactive map of Cerca-la-Source Arrondissement
- Country: Haiti
- Department: Centre

Area
  - Arrondissement: 607.01 km^{2} (234.37 sq mi)
  - Urban: 3.11 km^{2} (1.20 sq mi)
  - Rural: 603.9 km^{2} (233.2 sq mi)

Population (2015)
  - Arrondissement: 119,756
  - Density: 197.29/km^{2} (510.97/sq mi)
  - Urban: 21,790
  - Rural: 97,966
- Time zone: UTC-5 (Eastern)
- Postal code: HT54—
- Communes: 2
- Communal Sections: 5
- IHSI Code: 064

Cerca-la-Source (Haitian Creole: Sèka Lasous) is an arrondissement (district) in the Centre department of Haiti. As of 2015, the population was 119,756 inhabitants. Postal codes in the Cerca-la-Source Arrondissement start with the number 54.

The arrondissement consists of the following communes:

- Cerca-la-Source
- Thomassique
