= Thomonde =

Haitian commune

Thomonde Tomonn
- Commune
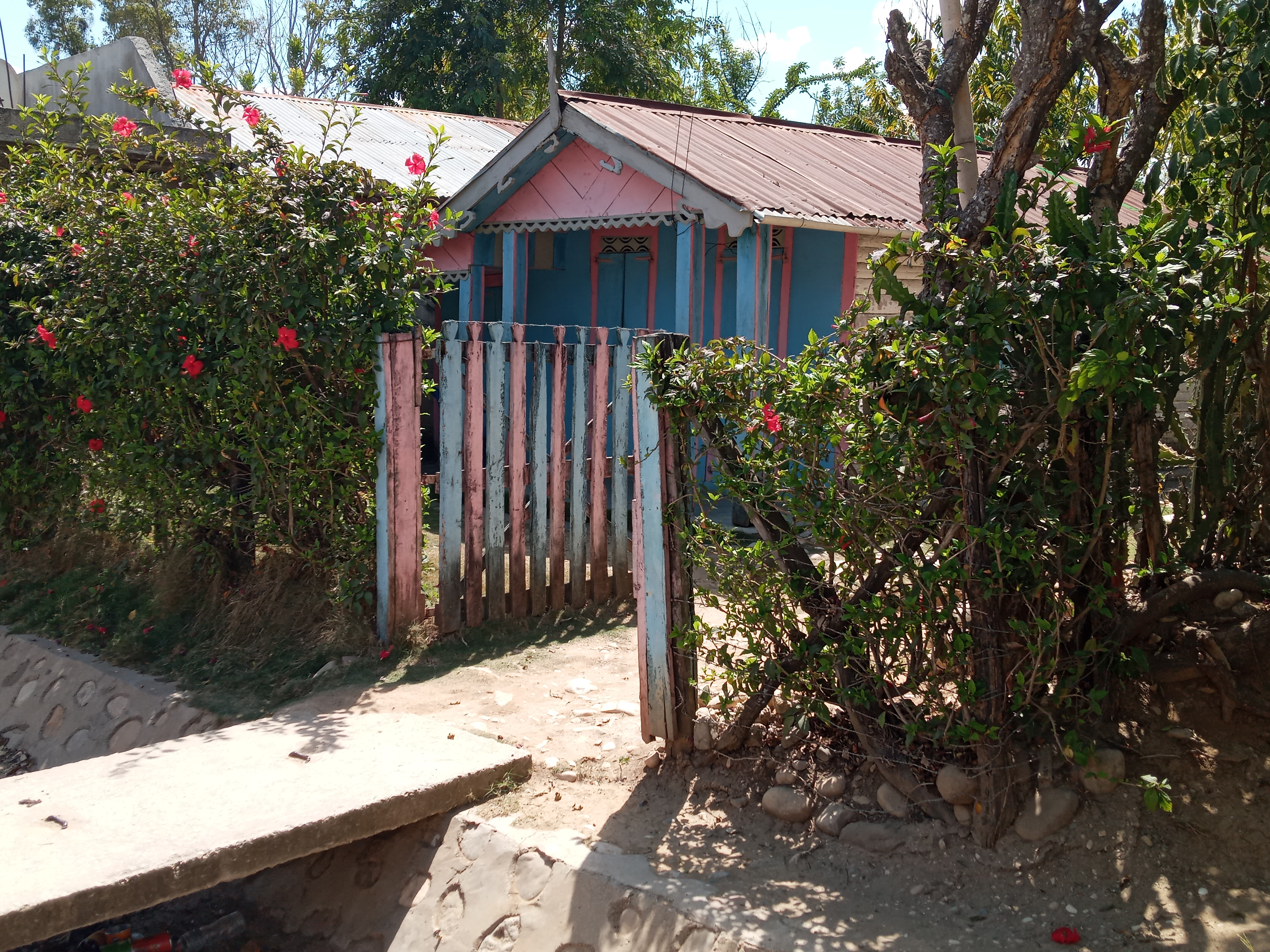
- Interactive map of Thomonde
- Location in Haiti
- Coordinates: 19°1′0″N 71°58′0″W
- Country: Haiti
- Department: Centre
- Arrondissement: Hinche

Area
  - Total: 138.96 sq mi (359.91 km^{2})
- Elevation: 896 ft (273 m)

Population (2015)
  - Total: 61,880
  - Density: 445.3/sq mi (171.9/km^{2})
- Time zone: UTC−05:00 (EST)
  - Summer (DST): UTC−04:00 (EDT)
- Postal code: HT 5130

Thomonde (French pronunciation: [tɔmɔ̃d]; Haitian Creole: Tomonn) is a commune in the Hinche Arrondissement, in the Centre department of Haiti. It is located in the Centre or "Plateau Central", arrondissement Hinche. Its sections are Cabral, Tierra Muscady, Baille Tourrible, and La Hoye. The geo-coordinates are 19.02N and 71.97W.

Since 2004 until at least 2012, Organization for the Development of the Peasants of Salmadère (ODPSA) facilitated the growth of maize and millet as well as improving soil development. In March 2012, it received $89,596 from Japan. Like other municipalities of the Centre Department, the town suffered a drought in 2012. In 2014, Minister of Economy and Finance Wilson Laleau accompanied by Counsellor for Legal Affairs Wolff Dubique, Abel Metelus, and other members of his cabinet agreed to launch an Integrated Agricultural Development Project centered in Thomonde with Compagnie de Promotion Immobilière et de Ressources Agricoles.

== See also ==
- Papaye Peasant Movement
- Thomonde Formation – Geologic formation in Haiti
