= Péligre Dam =

Dam in Centre, Haiti

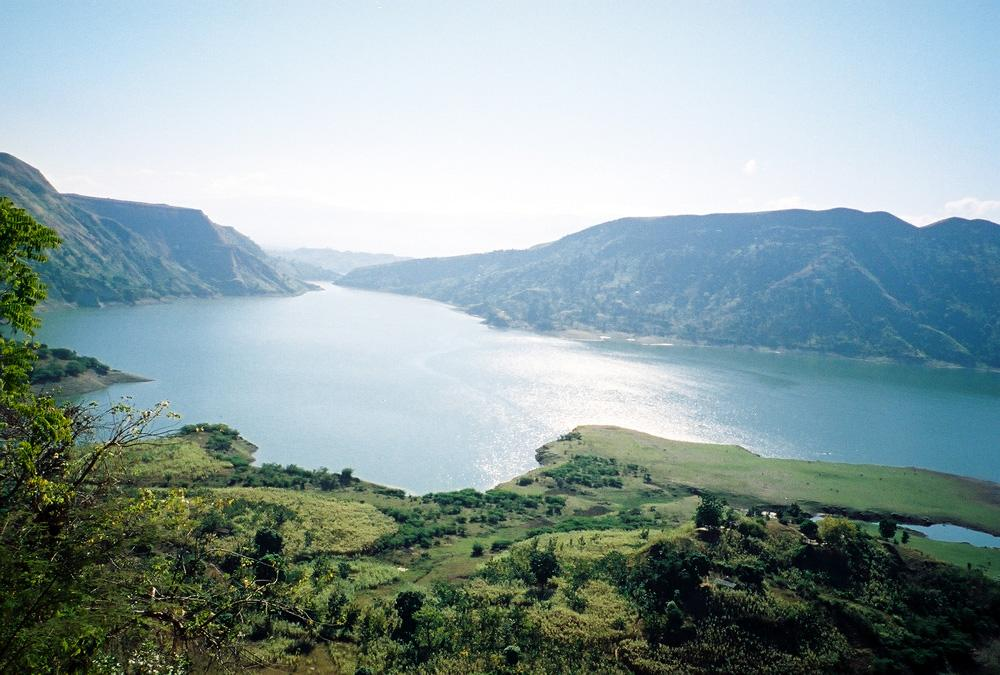
- Lake Péligre

- Location within Haiti
- Country: Haiti
- Location: Centre
- Coordinates: 18°54′02.85″N 72°02′21.96″W
- Purpose: Power, flood control
- Status: Operational
- Construction began: 1953
- Opening date: 1956; 70 years ago

Dam and spillways
- Type of dam: Gravity
- Impounds: Artibonite River
- Height: 72 m (236 ft)

Reservoir
- Creates: Lake Péligre
- Total capacity: 297,000,000 m^{3} (241,000 acre⋅ft)
- Active capacity: 249,000,000 m^{3} (202,000 acre⋅ft)
- Catchment area: 6,480 km^{2} (2,500 mi^{2})

Power Station
- Operator: Electricite d'Haiti
- Commission date: 1971
- Turbines: 3 x 17 MW Francis-type
- Installed capacity: 51 MW

The Péligre Dam is a gravity dam located off the Centre department on the Artibonite River of Haiti. At 72 m (236 ft) it is the tallest dam in Haiti. The dam was created as a flood-control and an energy-providing measure in the Artibonite River Valley during the 1950s, as part of the Artibonite Valley Agricultural Project. This dam impounds Lake Péligre.

Despite its purpose of providing energy throughout Haiti, many contend that the energy provided by the dam is not distributed equitably. Furthermore, the dam has had significant environmental, social, and health consequences on the local people, who were forced to relocate as a result of the dam's completion. These are points of concern to academics, journalists, and human rights activists who, noting heavy North American involvement in the planning and construction of the dam, believe that neoliberal influences may be at play.

== Background ==
=== Geography ===
The Péligre dam is in the Artibonite watershed, the largest hydrographic basin in Haiti.

=== Composition and dimensions ===
The power plant contains three 17 MW Francis turbine-generators for an installed capacity of 51 MW.

=== Initial building and purpose ===
The Péligre Dam was proposed as a means to rehabilitate the agricultural lands of the Central Plateau through control of floods as well as to generate hydroelectricity to fuel the industrial expansion of Haiti. The Artibonite would become the first source of hydroelectric power and irrigation water in that nation. The dam was popularized throughout the country as a mechanism for increased crop yields via controlled irrigation. Rice grown for export, in particular, was the target of this irrigation intervention. Also, it was believed that the generation of a reliable supply of electricity from the dam would drive economic growth and reduce social disparity.

Planning and construction of the dam was heavily influenced by the United States of America. The dam was nicknamed the “Little TVA” after the Tennessee Valley Authority, because of its purpose of providing energy for all of Haiti. The dam was designed by the United States Army Corps of Engineers. It was funded by the Export Import Bank of the United States. Construction on the dam was overseen by engineer André A. Loiselle. The dam was completed in 1956 by the US Army Corps of Engineers and Brown & Root, creating Lake Péligre (essentially a large reservoir) in the process.

== Power generation and distribution ==
The Péligre Hydroelectric Plant, which is the power plant associated with the dam, went online in 1971, 15 years after the completion of the dam itself. It is operated by the Electricité d’Haiti, or Electricity of Haiti (EDH), which reports to the Ministry of Public Works, Transport and Communications in Haiti. The main purpose of Electricité d’Haiti is electricity generation; under its management, the Péligre Hydroelectric Plant supplies 30% of the country's electricity.

Despite the plant's purpose to provide reliable energy to all of Haiti, there are some questions as to whether or not the dam achieves that goal in reality. Lumas Kendrick, of the Inter-American Development Bank states that, of the energy that is generated by the dam, over half is lost due to poor power lines, defective transformers, and billing issues. Of the energy that is generated and distributed, it is limited in its ability to reach all of Haiti, as only 12 per cent of the country has electrical wires. These areas with electricity are concentrated around urban centers, thereby reducing the overall impact of the hydroelectric power on rural development in the country.

== Recent developments ==
=== Silting ===
Silting has greatly reduced the operational capacity of the dam for the generation of electricity. The upper Artibonite watershed is faced with issues of severe erosion, caused by deforestation and agriculture. The erosion is estimated at 1,305 metric tons per km2 per year in the watershed, on average. The problems of heavy deforestation and soil erosion in rainy seasons have caused a large amount of sediment to become trapped in the dam, reducing its functionality. Additionally, the silt in the Péligre reservoir has decreased the reservoir storage capacity from 600 million cubic metres to 300 MCM in 60 years. Reforestation and erosion control methods discussed before the dam's creation have not been carried out.

As a result of the dam's reduced functioning, Haiti's electricity generation fell by more than 30 per cent from 2004–2010.

=== Rehabilitation ===
The dam and power plant were damaged during the 2010 Haiti earthquake. With the functional lifespan of the dam coming to a close, the Inter-American Development Bank and several other international organizations decided to fund a three-year, forty-eight million dollar rehabilitation for the dam, to be undertaken by Alstom and Compagnie de Montages Electriques a l’Exportation. This project is intended by the Inter-American Development Bank to increase the lifespan of the dam and power station by another twenty years.

== Controversy ==
Despite being called a technical success by donor agencies and NGOs, the Péligre Dam is considered in many local, academic, and humanitarian circles to be a failure, due to the destruction of local communities and the displacement of residents.

=== Energy distribution ===
In terms of power distribution, it has been asserted that the electricity from the dam is mainly distributed to agribusinesses, foreign-owned factories, and homes of the wealthier class in Port-au-Prince. Additionally, the continued energy starvation of rural residences is considered to contribute to the low development indicators in rural parts of the country, which are linked to lack of access to clean water, energy poverty, and insecurity.

=== Relocation ===
The dam is set in the Péligre basin of the Central Plateau in Haiti. This area is home to several hundred thousand rural people.

As a result of the completion of the dam in 1956, thousands of families were forced to flee their fertile land in the Artibonite Valley due to flooding caused by the Péligre Dam. These families, all of which were poor, rural peasant farmers, were forced to move to either seek employment in the city or to retreat into the less-fertile highlands above Lac Péligre. The majority received no compensation for the land they lost. Some also did not have access to public water or electricity. Farming in the hillsides is extremely difficult due to erosion, and famine and malnutrition constantly threaten the migrants.

According to personal testimonies collected by Dr. Paul Farmer working in Haiti, these displaced farming families never were subject to a properly enforced resettlement plan, instead being forced to migrate at a moment's notice when the water began to rise. Many farmers were not even aware of the building of the dam, though it was purported to be a part of a “poverty reduction program.”

=== Environmental effects ===
The dam was considered to be an environmentally friendly alternative to other sources of energy in Haiti, including the use of charcoal briquettes and firewood, which massively deforested the country. However, there are significant environmental effects of the dam itself on the locals. In addition to the usual environmental impact of reservoirs, the flooding caused by the dam has prompted the relocation of farming families, and there have been extremely high levels of deforestation and erosion on the hillsides where these farmers now reside.

Furthermore, because the primary interest of Electricité d'Haiti is generation of electricity, little consideration in water management decisions is given to flood mitigation in the watershed below the dam. Therefore, large water releases that cause flooding are common. These floods cause agricultural and infrastructural losses in the irrigated district, as well as impacting the local ecosystems and tributary flow regimes.

=== Health effects ===
Following the construction of the dam, rates of morbidity and mortality among the displaced population have risen significantly. The families who were relocated have experienced high TB rates and increased risk for HIV infection. In addition, there are many adverse acute and chronic health effects associated with poverty that may have resulted in these areas. In one study it was found that women in this particular region of Haiti tend to be more economically dependent on their husbands and partners than other women in Haiti, as a result of the extreme poverty. Therefore, this study found that these women are often subject to increased risk of forced sex, which itself is related to a number of negative health outcomes, including risk of HIV infection and other Sexually Transmitted Diseases, as well as increased chances of having an unplanned pregnancy. In another study, it is suggested that the impacts of the dam on changes in water regimes in the Meye Tributary System of the Artibonite River may also be linked to the 2010 Cholera outbreak in Haiti.

To worsen matters, international forces have largely neglected poor Haitians in need of health care, which exacerbated the already low ability of Haiti to provide sufficient medical resources and care.

=== Social effects ===
The effects of this dam and the resulting relocation of towns have had impacts on culture of the locals. The primary sources of income for 150,000 rural families in the Artibonite watershed, upstream of the dam, are livestock farming, charcoal production, and agriculture. However, the dam has left many of the rural families landless and living in a deteriorating local economy. As a result, the Péligre basin of Haiti is particularly affected by poverty compared to the rest of the country. Dr. Paul Farmer describes a sense of unfairness that permeates the mentality of the displaced refugees. Displaced residents are reported to look back on their life before the relocation as one of bountiful harvests and years of plenty. Now, these displaced people are some of the poorest in the world, and many blame their poverty on the dam, which brought them neither electricity nor water. According to Farmer, these people almost unanimously believe that the dam project has destroyed their old way of life, benefiting the distant city of Port-au-Prince instead.

== Academic critiques ==
For some, the instance of the Péligre Dam exemplifies an international development system that treats poor humans as means, not ends, with rich countries and corporate leaders considered to be more important than the poor people themselves. This perspective reflects neoliberal and neocolonial viewpoints on the poor of Haiti.

=== Paul Farmer ===
Paul Farmer, a doctor from the United States of America who founded Partners in Health and who works extensively in Haiti, has written several books on the international maltreatment of Haiti. Farmer promotes the idea that the poverty of the poor in Haiti is not their doing. Farmer considers poverty in Haiti to be a human rights abuse that is the result of structural violence driven by the economic interests of the wealthy elites. Paul Farmer's opinions on the Péligre Dam, popularized in the book Mountains Beyond Mountains, are based on extensive research on the area, the testimonies of locals, and personal observation

=== Neoliberalism ===
The building of the dam in Haiti is seen by critics as an example of neoliberalism in the country. Neoliberalism describes a governance model of market-based and business-friendly government that redistributes wealth from the poor to the very rich. Neoliberal policy emphasizes competition, individualism, and business through policies such as tax-cuts, business deregulation, privatization, free trade, cutbacks in government services and welfare.

Scholars believe that in Haiti, neoliberalism is marked by the structural violence of American institutions, the interests of the economic elites and the dispossession of the poor. The building of the Péligre Dam demonstrates some of these very same influences.

The building of the Péligre Dam itself can be linked to American economic interests. For example, the Péligre Dam was built with American funding from what would be the precursor to the World Bank and designed by American engineers. Furthermore, construction was carried out through a powerful Texan corporation called Brown and Root Corporation. In addition to these factors of the dam's construction, the way that the power generated by the hydroelectric plant in the dam is distributed also speaks to American interests. The dam supplies electricity to American-supported industries in Haiti. All of these external institutions at work on the dam speak to neoliberal influences, as the dam directly benefits American business interests.

Neoliberalism is also defined by the heightened importance of the interests of economic elites. As mentioned before, the power generated from the dam is used almost exclusively to power large agribusiness and factories around the urban centers of Haiti. Wealth in Haiti tends to be concentrated around these urban centers, so there is an extremely large urban-rural gap in Haiti already, The dam drives the widening of the rural-urban gap in Haiti by supplying the wealthy with electricity in order to keep their businesses functioning, and therefore it clearly reflects the influence of the economic interests of the wealthy.

Finally, the process of building the dam neglected the livelihoods of the poor that are impacted by the dam. From the initial planning stages of the dam in which locals were neither informed nor consulted to the forced relocation and reduction in quality of life for the locals, this dam has failed many of the poor local people and smallholder farmers it was ostensibly trying to help. To add insult to injury, the majority of these people do not have access to electricity, as was promised them before the dam's building by the Duvalier regime. In fact, the role of neoliberalism in Haiti is considered by some to date back to the dictatorship of the Duvaliers. It was during this regime that money was borrowed from banks in the U.S. to fund projects like the factories and agribusinesses, which were powered by the hydroelectricity from the Péligre Dam. This regime set a precedent in which the economic interests of the elite are considered to be more important than the livelihoods of the poor, increasing the disparity and animosity between the two groups.

The influence of neoliberalism continues to shape Haitian life, due to transnational economic interdependencies such as those that led to the building of the Péligre Dam.

=== Neocolonialism ===
In addition to neoliberalism, neocolonialism has also influenced the attitudes of elites towards the poor in the instance of the Péligre Dam. Neocolonialsim is a relatively recent form of colonialism. In order to advance their economic interests, neocolonial countries exploit poorer countries by wielding market power, instead of relying on military force.

As a result of neocolonial influences, foreign actors feel justified in the belief that the deep poverty in Haiti is due to Haiti's own shortcomings, instead of being the result of neocolonialism committed by wealthy countries with economic interest in Haiti. This shift of the blame for poverty from international and powerful actors to the poor people themselves has allowed developed countries with economic ties to Haiti to ignore the responsibilities they have to the poor people even today. Paul Farmer describes this phenomenon as pathologizing the society and blaming the locals so that the economic interests of outsiders are not subject to questioning or blame. This transfer of blame stems from traditional colonialism, in which the poor of outside countries were depicted as others and outcasts, thereby allowing colonizers to justify denial of the full human dignity of slaves and other colonial subjects.
