= Belladère =

Belladère Beladè
- Commune
- Interactive map of Belladère
- Location in Haiti
- Coordinates: 18°52′0″N 71°46′0″W
- Country: Haiti
- Department: Centre
- Arrondissement: Lascahobas
- Dominican cession to Haiti: 1936

Area
  - Total: 296.65 km^{2} (114.54 sq mi)
- Elevation: 400 m (1,300 ft)

Population (2015)
  - Total: 86,612
  - Density: 291.97/km^{2} (756.19/sq mi)
- Postal code: HT 5320

Belladère (French pronunciation: [beladɛʁ]; Haitian Creole: Beladè, Spanish: Veladero) is a commune in the Lascahobas Arrondissement, inside the Centre department of Haiti. Its border crossing into the Dominican town of Comendador is one of the four chief land crossings into the Dominican Republic.

It belonged to the Dominican Republic until 1936, when Dominican and Haitian leaders agreed to a boundary change in favor of Haiti, as the Haitian government commanded by Sténio Vincent wanted to move the border eastward while the Dominican regime under Rafael Trujillo saw the cession of the territory (despite some domestic opposition) as a de-Haitianization of the country, as that area had experienced significant Haitian settlement in the previous decades, bolstered by both Haiti's population explosion and scarcity of wastelands, with ethnic Dominicans becoming a minority in Belladère (then Veladero) and its surrounding areas.
