= Mirebalais Arrondissement =

Coordinates: 18.8333°N 72.1°W

Mirbalais Arrondissement Arrondissement de Mirbalais Awondisman Mibalè
- Arrondissement
- Interactive map of Mirbalais Arrondissement
- Country: Haiti
- Department: Centre

Area
  - Arrondissement: 863.91 km^{2} (333.56 sq mi)
  - Urban: 8.66 km^{2} (3.34 sq mi)
  - Rural: 855.25 km^{2} (330.21 sq mi)

Population (2015)
  - Arrondissement: 192,852
  - Density: 223.23/km^{2} (578.17/sq mi)
  - Urban: 28,014
  - Rural: 164,838
- Time zone: UTC-5 (Eastern)
- Postal code: HT52—
- Communes: 3
- Communal Sections: 11
- IHSI Code: 062

Mirebalais (pronounced [miʁbalɛ]; Haitian Creole: Mibalè) is an arrondissement in the Centre department of Haiti. As of 2015, the population was 192,852 inhabitants. Postal codes in the Mirebalais Arrondissement start with the number 52.

The arrondissement consists of the following communes:

- Mirebalais
- Saut-d'Eau
- Boucan-Carré
