= Savanette =

Savanette Savanèt
- Commune
- Interactive map of Savanette
- Location in Haiti
- Coordinates: 18°44′44″N 71°49′17″W
- Country: Haiti
- Department: Centre
- Arrondissement: Lascahobas

Area
  - Total: 174.83 km^{2} (67.50 sq mi)

Population (2015)
  - Total: 36,200
  - Density: 207/km^{2} (536/sq mi)
- Time zone: UTC−05:00 (EST)
  - Summer (DST): UTC−04:00 (EDT)
- Postal code: HT 5330

Savanette (French pronunciation: [savanɛt]; Haitian Creole: Savanèt) is a commune in the Lascahobas Arrondissement, in the Centre department of Haiti. It has 36,200 inhabitants as of 2015.
