= Saut-d'Eau =

Saut-d'Eau Sodo
- Commune
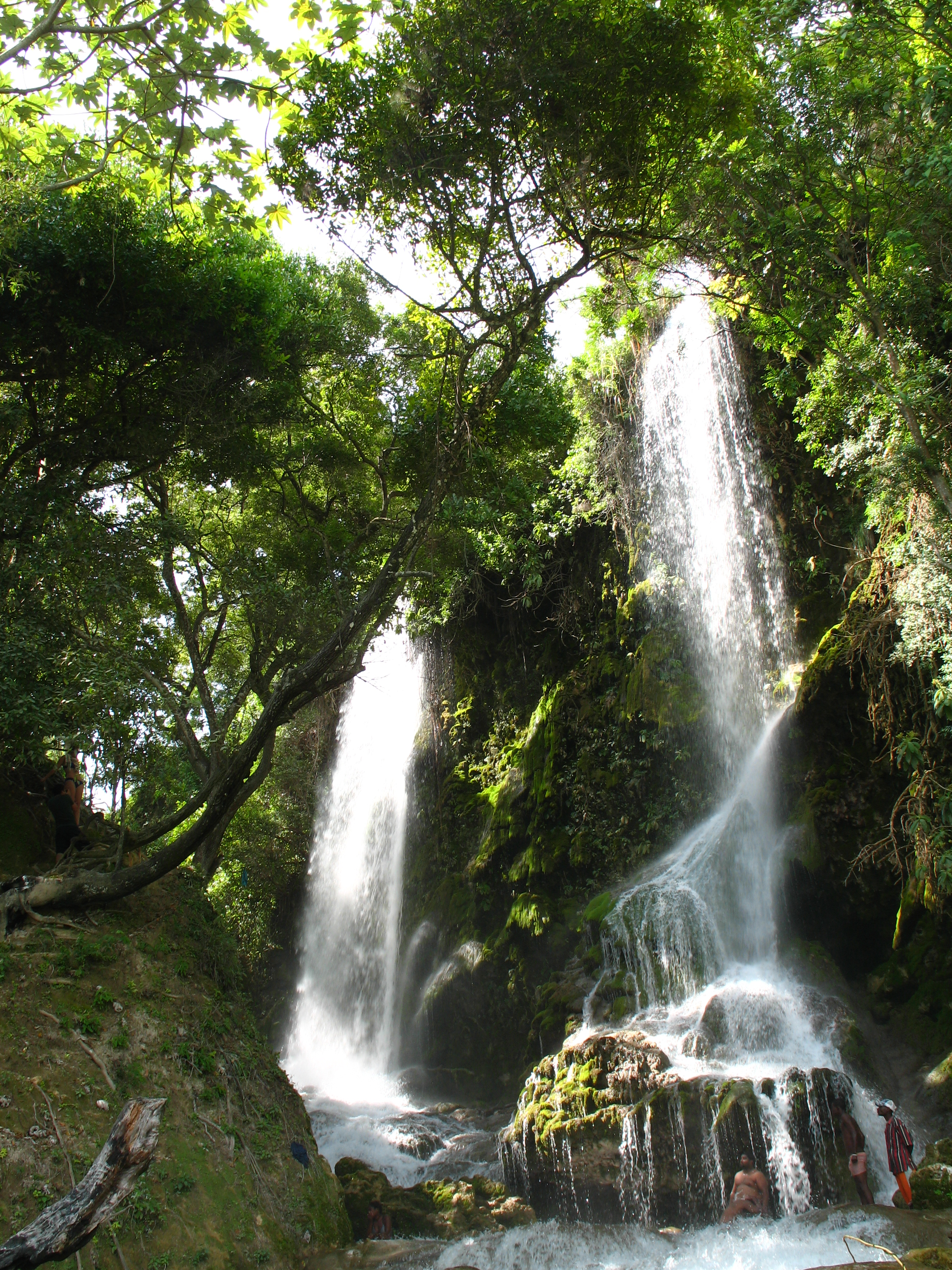
- Saut-d'Eau Waterfall
- Interactive map of Saut-d'Eau
- Location in Haiti
- Coordinates: 18°49′0″N 72°12′0″W
- Country: Haiti
- Department: Centre
- Arrondissement: Mirebalais

Area
  - Total: 179.41 km^{2} (69.27 sq mi)
- Elevation: 233 m (764 ft)

Population (2015)
  - Total: 39,069
  - Density: 217.76/km^{2} (564.01/sq mi)
- Time zone: UTC−05:00 (EST)
  - Summer (DST): UTC−04:00 (EDT)
- Postal code: HT 5220

Saut-d'Eau (French pronunciation: [so do]; Haitian Creole: Sodo) is a commune in the Mirebalais Arrondissement, in the Centre department of Haiti. It has 34,885 inhabitants.

Its name is French for 'waterfall', named after a large waterfall called 'Le Saut'. It is said that this waterfall was created in the massive earthquake of May 7, 1842. The waterfall is approximately 100 feet high and is the tallest in Haiti.

The area holds cultural significance in Haiti, to both Catholic and Vodou practitioners. In the 19th century, it is believed that the Virgin Mary of Mount Carmel (or the closely associated Erzulie Dantor, a Vodou loa) appeared on a palm tree there. In some accounts, this appearance is said to have occurred during the 1860s. Another account states that there were two appearances of the Virgin in the 1840s and later in the 1880s. In Laguerre's detailed account, an apparition of the Virgin Mary first reported in Saut d'Eau on July 16, 1849, by a man reportedly named Fortune Morose. In numerous oral accounts collected by Laguerre from local people, the young man went away in fear but returned shortly accompanied by a police officer. Together, they found a portrait of the apparition on the leaf of a nearby palm tree.

Trees where the apparition took place are reported to have been cut down by French priests. In Laguerre's description, the locals "have fresh in their memory" that

two priests... cut down the trees where the Holy Virgin had appeared. In 1891... a French missionary named Father Lenouvel considered the tree of the first apparitions the locus for superstitious practices and cut it down. After having done so, he went to the church, lost consciousness and died the same day. The faithful believe that he was punished for his sacrilegious act... The pilgrims continued to venerate another palm tree in the vicinity .... another priest named Father Cessens cut down this second palm tree. Strangely enough, this priest suffered a paralytic stroke and died a few months later. This occurrence strengthened the faith that the pilgrims had in the apparitions and was interpreted as the revenge of the Holy Virgin as well as of the voodoo spirits. Various Haitian governments' blessing of Saut D'Eau as the national pilgrimage center and the faith of the Saudolese and the pilgrims have forced, to some extent, the Catholic clergy to accept the situation as a fact of life.

Annually, the falls are the site of a large, important religious pilgrimage, during the festival of Our Lady of Carmel, from July 14–16. A Eucharistic rite is held during the festival, as well as various vodou rituals, but the penultimate devotional activity is bathing in the waters of the falls, and asking favors of the Virgin or Erzulie. The water is also sacred to the loa Damballah and Ayida Wedo, the book The Serpent and the Rainbow is named for their appearance at this site. The pilgrimage has been described as an excellent "example of the syncretic nature of Haitian religious life. In Ville-Bonheur there is a Mass, and the church's statue of the Virgin is paraded around town, while at the falls there are Vodou baptisms and ceremonies.... Ville-Bonheur throngs with people who happily attend both religious gatherings".
