= Cerca-Carvajal =

Cerca-Carvajal Sèka Kavajal
- Commune
- Interactive map of Cerca-Carvajal
- Location in Haiti
- Coordinates: 19°16′0″N 71°57′0″W
- Country: Haiti
- Department: Centre
- Arrondissement: Hinche

Area
  - Total: 156.59 km^{2} (60.46 sq mi)
- Elevation: 459 m (1,506 ft)

Population (2015)
  - Total: 23,254
  - Density: 148.50/km^{2} (384.62/sq mi)
- Time zone: UTC−05:00 (EST)
  - Summer (DST): UTC−04:00 (EDT)
- Postal code: HT 5140

Cerca-Carvajal (French pronunciation: [sɛʁka kaʁvaʒal]; Haitian Creole: Sèka Kavajal) is a commune in the Hinche Arrondissement, in the Centre department of Haiti. It has 23,254 inhabitants as of 2015.
