= Thomassique =

Thomassique Tomasik
- Commune
- Interactive map of Thomassique
- Location in Haiti
- Coordinates: 19°5′0″N 71°50′0″W
- Country: Haiti
- Department: Centre
- Arrondissement: Cerca-la-Source

Area
  - Total: 262.01 km^{2} (101.16 sq mi)
- Elevation: 299 m (981 ft)

Population (2015)
  - Total: 63,224
  - Density: 241.30/km^{2} (624.97/sq mi)
- Time zone: UTC−05:00 (EST)
  - Summer (DST): UTC−04:00 (EDT)
- Postal code: HT 5420

Thomassique (French pronunciation: [tɔmasik]; Haitian Creole: Tomasik) is a commune in the Cerca-la-Source Arrondissement, in the Centre department of Haiti. It has 63,224 inhabitants as of 2015.
