= Boucan-Carré =

Boucan-Carré Boukan Kare
- Commune
- Interactive map of Boucan-Carré
- Location in Haiti
- Coordinates: 18°58′0″N 72°12′0″W
- Country: Haiti
- Department: Centre
- Arrondissement: Mirebalais

Area
  - Total: 353.63 km^{2} (136.54 sq mi)
- Elevation: 297 m (974 ft)

Population (2015)
  - Total: 56,028
  - Density: 158.44/km^{2} (410.35/sq mi)
- Time zone: UTC−05:00 (EST)
  - Summer (DST): UTC−04:00 (EDT)
- Postal code: HT 5230

Boucan-Carré (French pronunciation: [bukɑ̃ kaʁe]; Haitian Creole: Boukan Kare) is a commune in the Mirebalais Arrondissement, in the Centre department of Haiti. It has 56,028 inhabitants in 2015.

== Geography ==
Boucan-Carré is a geographic expression is a huge area of land, most of which is covered in mountains and deep valleys. Agriculture and the production of charcoal made from cutting down trees are the primary ways to get by for the locals. The Boucan-Carré River cuts through the center of the town of Chambeau.

== Economy ==
Since the destructive earthquake that struck the Port-au-Prince area in January 2010, many people are returning to their families from the city which is causing further strain on people and land. Clean water is still difficult to come by and a multitude of necessities remain very expensive due to devaluation of the Haitian gourde and the extreme stress on the economy in general. All goods are expensive the further away you get from Port-au-Prince. All of rural Haiti is in flux and is experiencing a deep strain brought on by the earthquake.

== Infrastructures ==
Boucan-Carré has seen massive changes in the early 21st century, with a primary school completed in 2005, and a secondary school completed in November 2012, and a clinic that has grew into a fully functioning hospital which is supported by Paul Farmer's organization, Partners In Health (known as Zanmi Lasante in Haitian Creole) based out of Boston, MA. The two schools, a church and a hospital within Boucan-Carré are supported by the Haiti Outreach Program in Knoxville, Tennessee that hosts its annual Give Haiti Hope.

=== Roads ===
The UN has made substantial improvements to the roads leading to the area from Port-au-Prince airport (PAP) so that what used to take 4.5 hours to go 45 miles back in 2004, now takes only two hours to arrive in Chambeau.

== Telecommunications ==
Digicel built a large Cellular Telephone Repeater Tower in the commune in about 2008, as locals can be seen riding donkeys while talking on cell phones.
