= Papaye Peasant Movement =

The Papaye Peasant Movement, Mouvman Peyizan Papay (MPP) in Haitian Creole, is a grass-roots organization recognized as the largest peasant movement in Haiti. MPP has approximately 60,000 members, including 20,000 women and 10,000 youths. It is localized in the Central Plateau, home to about 13% of the Haitian population, the majority of whom are rural subsistence farmers or agricultural workers.

MPP focuses on re-establishing food sovereignty in Haiti through a number or programs and methods which include educating people on sustainable farming methods and organizing skills. While these are the primary foci of MPP, the organization has expanded to provide a plethora of other services to its members, including legal aid, health care services, and university scholarships. The movement seeks to empower peasants to control their own livelihood, thus decreasing dependency on multinational organizations which have flooded the Haitian agricultural market in recent decades.

== Organization ==
Workers in the same neighborhood join to form groups which meet weekly. At least seven groups in the same region form a local assembly, which meets monthly. The regional assembly, comprising at least four local assemblies, meets every three months, while the general assembly – which all local assemblies attend – meets once a year.

== History ==
The Papaye Peasant Movement was established in 1973 by Jean-Baptiste Chavannes, a Catholic lay-worker turned agronomist, with the intent to collaborate with rural farmworkers in order to develop more efficient and more sustainable farming methods. Though Chavannes originally worked with two small groups (groupements) of workers, MPP now includes over 4,000 groups. The organizations' activities have diversified over time, in a slow but methodical manner, beginning with economic initiatives.

In 1976, MPP implemented a savings and credit union, SERE POU CHOFE (Haitian Creole for "Save to Warm") in part because the heads of the movement saw increasing personal income and tackling hunger is being inherently linked to one another. SERE POU CHOFE enabled members to where members deposit savings from which other members could borrow and then replenish.

In 1978, MPP created Konbit Sèvo Men Ak Kè Ansanm (Union of minds, hearts and hands), also known as KOSMIKA, a multi-sector union which focused on storing and producing agricultural products, finding and building warehouses to store farming tools, and establishing a farmer's bank. The following year, MPP founded a youth leadership program and the Young Peasant Workers association or Jeunes Travailleurs Paysan (JTP) which works to educate youths on a variety of subjects and prepares them to take on leadership roles later in life.

The Movement of Women of MPP, along with a separate association for and run by women, was established in 1981 in order to attack gender inequality within the movement. These two entities focus on tackling violence against women, defending social and cultural rights, as well as promoting economic independence.

During its early years, the MPP had to maintain a relatively low profile due to political and economic oppression imposed by the Duvalier regime in Haiti. When Duvalier was forced out in 1986, the movement began to gain political traction, and played a large role in supporting Operation Lavalas, Jean-Bertrand Aristide's party. Aristide became the first democratically elected president of Haiti in 1991, only to be overthrown a few months later. Many of the leaders of MPP went into hiding, while others were imprisoned or tortured. Chavannes Jean-Baptiste himself went into exile from 1993 to 1994. Nevertheless, the movement continued its activities and opened an office in Boston in order to spread information on a worldwide scale. Full operations resumed in 1994 when Haiti established a constitutional government.

== Intervention areas ==
=== Community education and legal aid ===
MPP provides a number of training education programs and workshops for group members, while also providing university-level training for middle managers who often come back to the organization. Higher-level workshops are also provided to trained instructors.

The youth education program, JTP, is organized by a three-tier system: pre-nursery JTP (PPJTP) for children ages 5 to 10, nursery JTP (PJTP) for children ages 10 to 15, and JTP for people ages 15 to 30, though members of JTP can also become group members or leaders within MPP. JTP programs provide courses on sex education, sports, music, dance, theater, and cultural activities. Some participants receive university scholarships and are sent to study in Port-au-Prince or abroad.

MPP also has a legal aid department which informs members of their rights, basic legal training, as well as legal services.

=== Economic services ===
MPP develops cooperatives within different assemblies and trains assembly members to manage the financial aspects of their projects. The organization also conducts feasibility and productivity studies, helps groups prepare reports, and provides economic counseling. In February, 2013, MPP celebrated the inauguration of a modern corn storage and processing mill which was built with the help of two Canadian organizations: Développement et Paix and ACDI.

=== Community healthcare ===
MPP has a number of health projects relating to hygiene, sexual health, nutrition, and parenting skills. It also has a health center with a laboratory, and a pharmacy where community members can receive services and medical consultations. MPP also has a community health worker program.

== Programs ==
=== Agro-ecology ===
About 75% of the Haitian population lives in rural areas, a large portion of whom practice subsistence agriculture. Until the 1980s, the country was in large part self-sustainable in terms of rice, manioc, and potato production. After the dismantlement of the Duvalier dictatorship, however, organizations such as the International Monetary Fund and the World Bank urged the country to liberalize markets and undergo structural reform, leading to a rural exodus and greatly affecting the agricultural sector. The liberalization of markets caused government funding for agricultural and public-sector development to decrease, further depleting the agricultural sector. Many multinational corporations took advantage of the newly liberalized market to export goods, creating Haitian dependency on agricultural imports. Additionally, deforestation has caused mass erosion, thus decreasing soil arability and quality.

MPP's agro-ecology program seeks to address the issue of dependence and food sovereignty by focusing on forms of agriculture based on environmental health. The organization teaches innovative farming practices, including germinating seedlings inside discarded tires and using other methods so as not to exhaust the land. Farmers focus on growing organic, indigenous crops in order to maintain biodiversity, and thus reject hybrid and GMO seed donations from multinational corporations. The program also comprises a reforestation component in order to help improve soil quality and prevent further erosion. Since its inception, MPP members have planted over 20 million trees, and their efforts continue.

=== Water management ===
MPP conducts courses on water management and storage. Methods include draining water from kitchens and showers into ponds filled, gravel, and charcoal, thus producing clean water. This water is then used to for irrigation and fish breeding. MPP also uses cisterns to catch water on roofs, mountain-top catchment lakes, and water-drip irrigation systems in order to save and store water.

=== Alternative energy ===
MPP has taken on multiple alternative energy initiatives. Leaders have conducted workshops on how to install solar panels and how to build solar-powered batteries; they have also established a facility to manufacture solar products. Additionally, MPP promotes the use of natural fertilizer such as manure and compost. They also produce alternative charcoal, bio-fuel from waste, and other alternative energy methods.

=== Eco-villages ===
After the 2010 earthquake, there was an urban exodus to rural areas like Papaye, particularly from the Haitian capital of Port-au-Prince. MPP set up a camp for internally displaced people, and in collaborations with partners such as Unitarian Universalist Service Committee (UUSC), helped refugees build eco-villages. Earthquake survivors, MPP members, and volunteers built the houses, – survivors were paid a minimum salary for their work – taught urban dwellers sustainable farming methods, and set up personal and community gardens. Water management methods were also installed so that eco-village dwellers would have access to clean water. So far, the experiment has been a success and many other organizations are replicating this model in Haiti and elsewhere.

== Campaigns and public events ==
=== World Environment Day protest ===
In June, 2012, 12,000 Haitian farmers marched in the streets of the town of Hinche in order to protest multinational corporations pushing hybrid seeds and biofuels on local farmers. They buried coffins inscribed with the names of a number of corporations as a part of the protest.

=== Seeds for Haïti ===
The Seeds for Haïti campaign was launched in 2012 in the aftermath of Hurricane Sandy in collaboration with MPP's French partner, Frères des Hommes. The organizations were able to raise enough money to buy 20 tons of seeds in order to support Haitian farmers who lost their supply as a result of the hurricane.

== See also ==
- Haitian Heritage Museum
- List of island countries
- Sustainable development
- Sustainable food system
- Sustainable landscaping
