= Hinche Arrondissement =

Coordinates: 19.15°N 72.0167°W

Hinche Arrondissement Arrondissement de Hinche Awondisman Ench
- Arrondissement
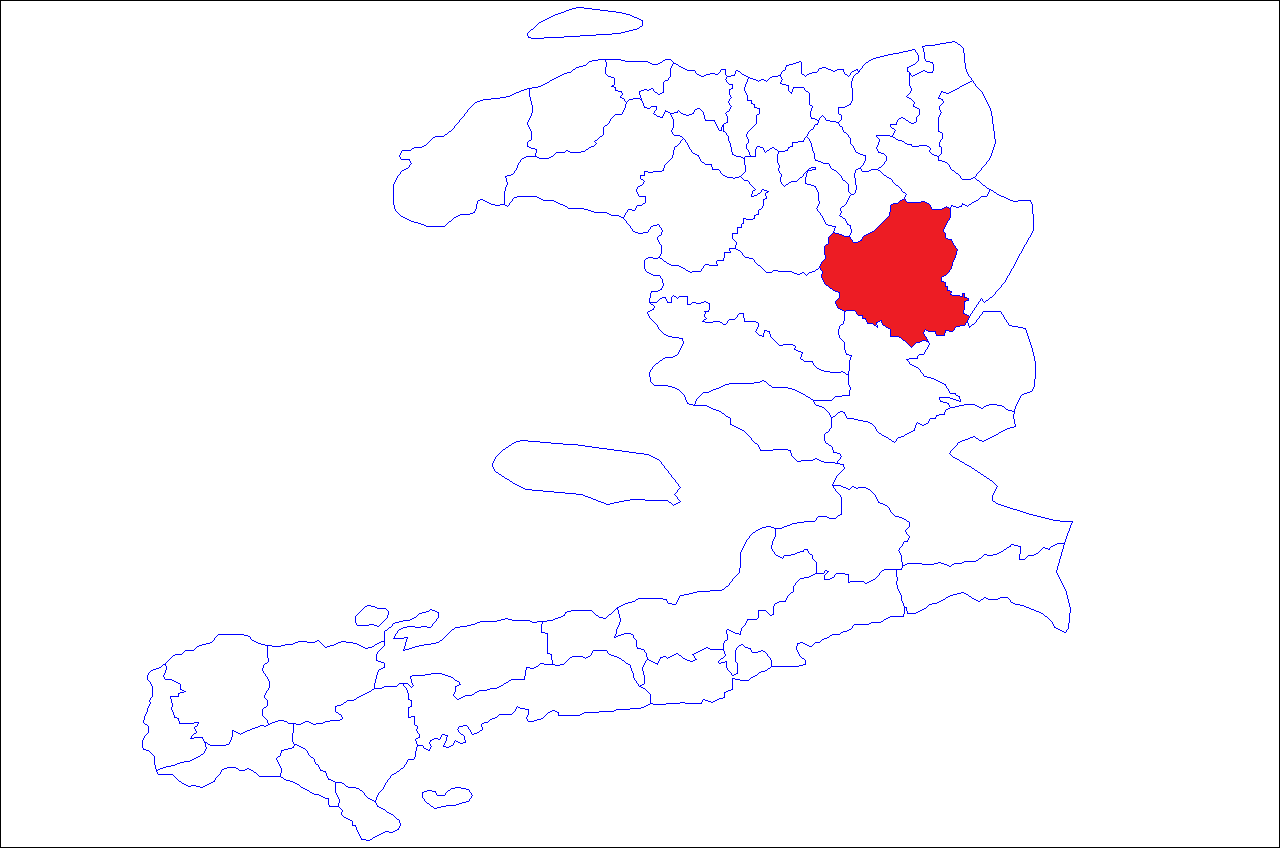
- Interactive map of Hinche Arrondissement
- Country: Haiti
- Department: Centre

Area
  - Arrondissement: 1,393.33 km^{2} (537.97 sq mi)
  - Urban: 19.09 km^{2} (7.37 sq mi)
  - Rural: 1,374.24 km^{2} (530.60 sq mi)

Population (2015)
  - Arrondissement: 264,943
  - Density: 190.151/km^{2} (492.489/sq mi)
  - Urban: 70,558
  - Rural: 194,385
- Time zone: UTC-5 (Eastern)
- Postal code: HT51—
- Communes: 4
- Communal Sections: 12
- IHSI Code: 061

Hinche (Haitian Creole: Ench) is an arrondissement in the Centre department of Haiti. As of 2015, the population was 264,943 inhabitants. Postal codes in the Hinche Arrondissement start with the number 51.

The arrondissement consists of the following communes:

- Hinche
- Cerca-Cavajal
- Maïssade
- Thomonde
