= Centre (department) =

Department of Haiti

Coordinates: 19.15°N 72.0167°W

Centre Sant
- Department
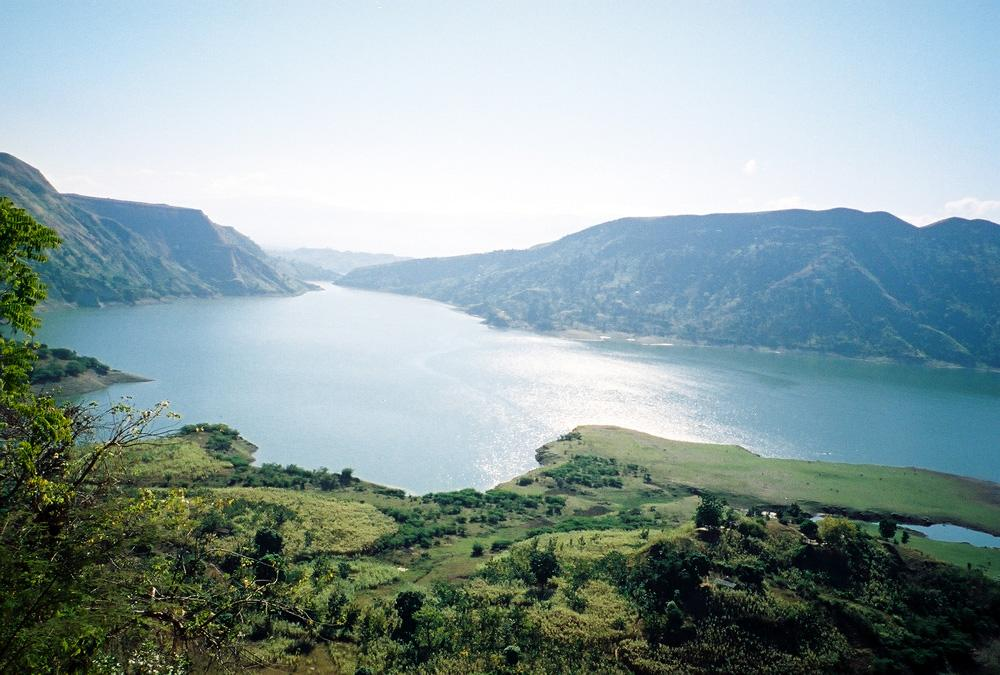
- Peligre Lake

- Centre in Haiti
- Country: Haiti
- Capital: Hinche
- Région: Central
- Symbole: Hispaniolan trogon

Government
  - Type: Departmental Council

Area
  - Department: 3,487.41 km^{2} (1,346.50 sq mi)

Population (2015)
  - Department: 746,236
  - Density: 213.980/km^{2} (554.206/sq mi)
  - Urban: 151,488
  - Rural: 594,748
- Time zone: UTC-05:00 (EST)
  - Summer (DST): UTC-04:00 (EDT)
- ISO 3166 code: HT-CE
- HDI (2022): 0.485 low · 10th

Centre (French, pronounced [sɑ̃tʁ]) or Sant (Haitian Creole; both meaning "Center") is the only landlocked department (French: départements; Haitian Creole: depatman) of Haiti, located in the center of the country along the border with the Dominican Republic. As of 2015, its estimated population was 746,236. Its capital is Hinche.

Centre was established in 1962 during François Duvalier's territorial reorganization. It is the third-largest department of Haiti, and is divided into four arrondissements and 12 communes. The Peligre Dam, the largest hydroelectric dam on Hispaniola, is located in the department and provides water to Artibonite.

== History ==
=== Taino Period ===
The department was part of the Marien kasika and Maguana alongside San Juan de la Maguana under the leadership of Caonabo.

=== Spanish Period ===
Much of the Centre Departement was Spanish territorial even after the Treaty of Ryswick. Many towns were built and settled by the Spanish like Hincha, Las Caobas, San Rafael and many more.

=== French Period ===
The southern part of the department was French territory with towns like Mirebalais.

=== Haitian Period ===
==== Haitian Revolution ====
The department played a big part in the Revolution serving as maroon territory extending to the Baoruco. Toussaint Louverture capture the town of Hinche from the Spanish for the French making it an early Haitian territory.

==== Independence ====
David Troy commander of Mirebalais is a signatory of the Haitian Declaration of Independence.

In contemporary times the department played a big role in the fight against the American Marines, being a Caco a refuge for men like Charlemagne Péralte and Benoit Batraville.

== Geography ==
It borders the Dominican Republic with the province of Elías Piña to the east and is the only landlocked department in Haiti.

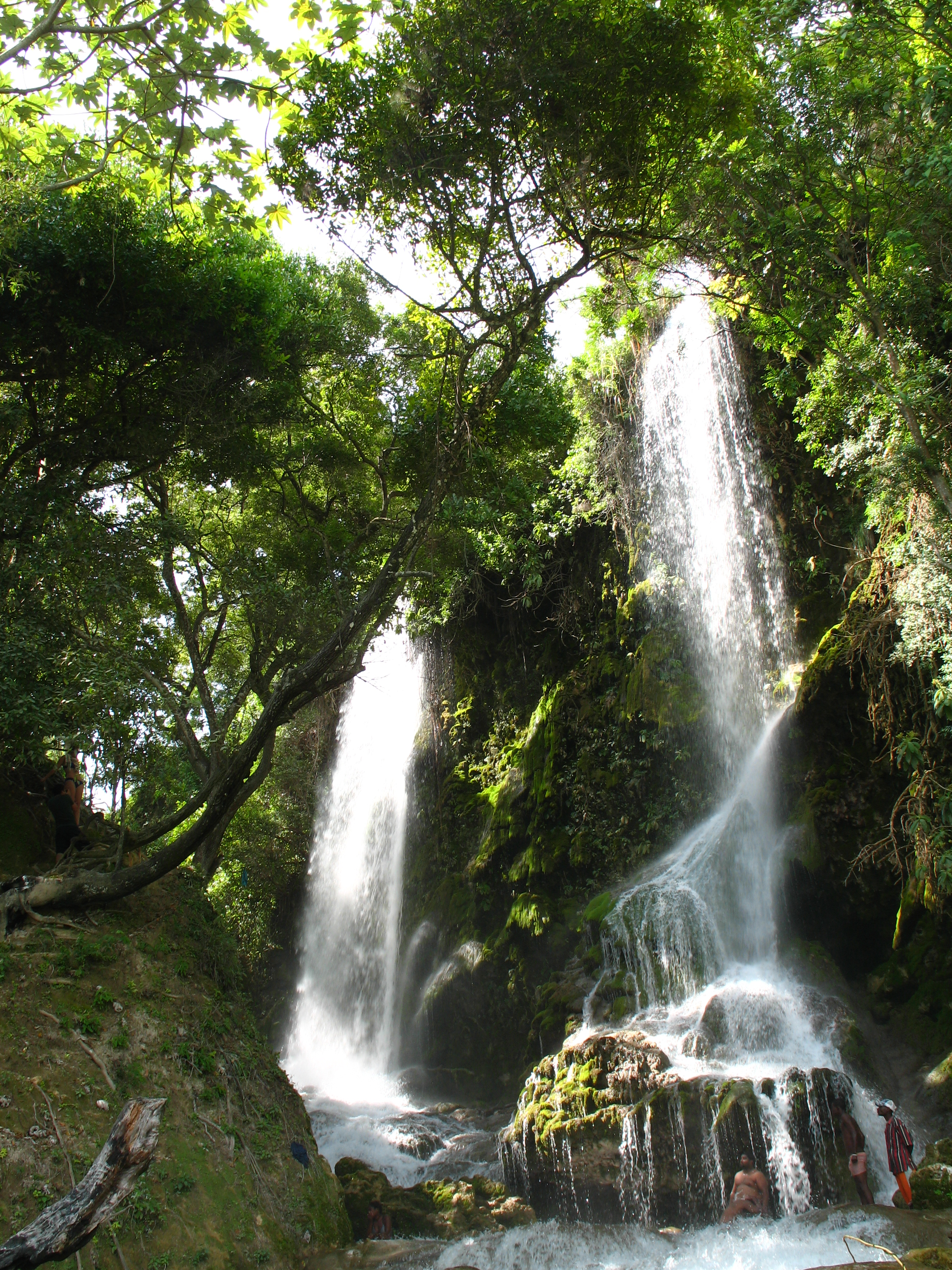
Waterfall at Saut-d'Eau in Centre, Haiti

Centre is the only department without access to the sea, but is nevertheless affected by soil erosion as a result of deforestation. In 2004, the floods caused by Hurricane Jeanne resulted in hundreds of deaths, focused in Centre and Artibonite Departments.

It contains the second largest lake in Haiti Lake Péligre, which was created as a result of the construction of the Péligre Dam on the Artibonite River during the 1950s. It is the largest hydroelectric dam in the Caribbean.

The Centre department is a high plateau topographical region. Due to its isolation if one of the greenest departments.

== Historical places ==
- Hinche: Former Dominican territory. Siece to Republic of Haiti in 1929. Birthplace of Charlemagne Péralte, the leader of the Cacos movement, which opposed the American occupation in 1915.
- Mirebalais and Lascahobas: Place of bloody fighting of Toussaint Louverture against the English, who were resupplying in the Central Plateau (1795). Birthplace of Benoît Batraville.

== Economy ==
=== Tourism ===
The department has two of Haiti's most impressive waterfalls, Sodo, which receives much local tourism in August for the Mont-Carmel Vodoun Pilgrimage, and Zim.

=== Agriculture ===
Centre is known for their tobacco production, goat and turkey.

== Administrative divisions ==
The Department of Centre is subdivided into four arrondissements, which are further subdivided in 13 communes.

- Cerca la Source Arrondissement
  - Cerca-la-Source
  - Thomassique
- Hinche Arrondissement
  - Hinche
  - Cerca-Cavajal
  - Maissade
  - Thomonde
- Lascahobas Arrondissement
  - Lascahobas
  - Belladere
  - Savanette
  - Baptiste
- Mirebalais Arrondissement
  - Mirebalais
  - Saut-d'Eau
  - Boucan-Carre

== Transport ==
The RD3 connects it to the North and the West. The RD304 connects it to Gonaives. The RD301 connects it to St-Marc.
