= Lake Péligre =

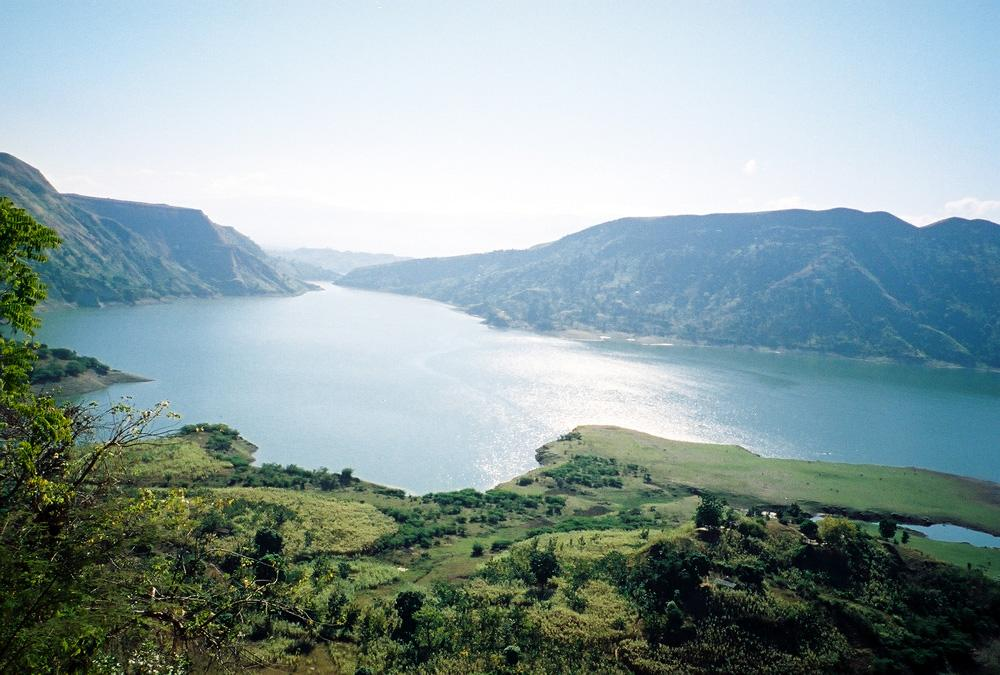
- View from National Route 3

- Location within Haiti
- Location: Centre
- Coordinates: 18°54′30″N 72°0′0″W
- Type: reservoir
- Primary inflows: Artibonite River
- Primary outflows: Artibonite River
- Basin countries: Haiti

Lake Péligre (French: Lac de Péligre, pronounced [lak də peliɡʁ]) is the second largest lake in Haiti, and is located in the Centre department.

It was created as a result of the construction of the Peligre Hydroelectric Dam on the Artibonite River in 1956–1957. The project was designed by the U.S. Army Corps of Engineers and financed by the Export-Import Bank of the United States. According to Tracy Kidder's book Mountains Beyond Mountains, Brown & Root was a contractor in the Péligre Dam project.

There is a lot of controversy surrounding the dam. Much of the benefit of the dam's construction has gone to a small group of wealthy individuals, at the expense of the poor farmers who utilized much of the land that is now submerged. The extreme poverty those displaced families have faced has largely been untold, but is often mentioned in the talks of Dr. Paul Farmer; "if you saw with peasant eyes, the scene looked violent and ugly, a lake that had buried the good farmland and ravaged the highlands."
