= Cerca-la-Source =

Cerca-la-Source Sèka Lasous
- Commune
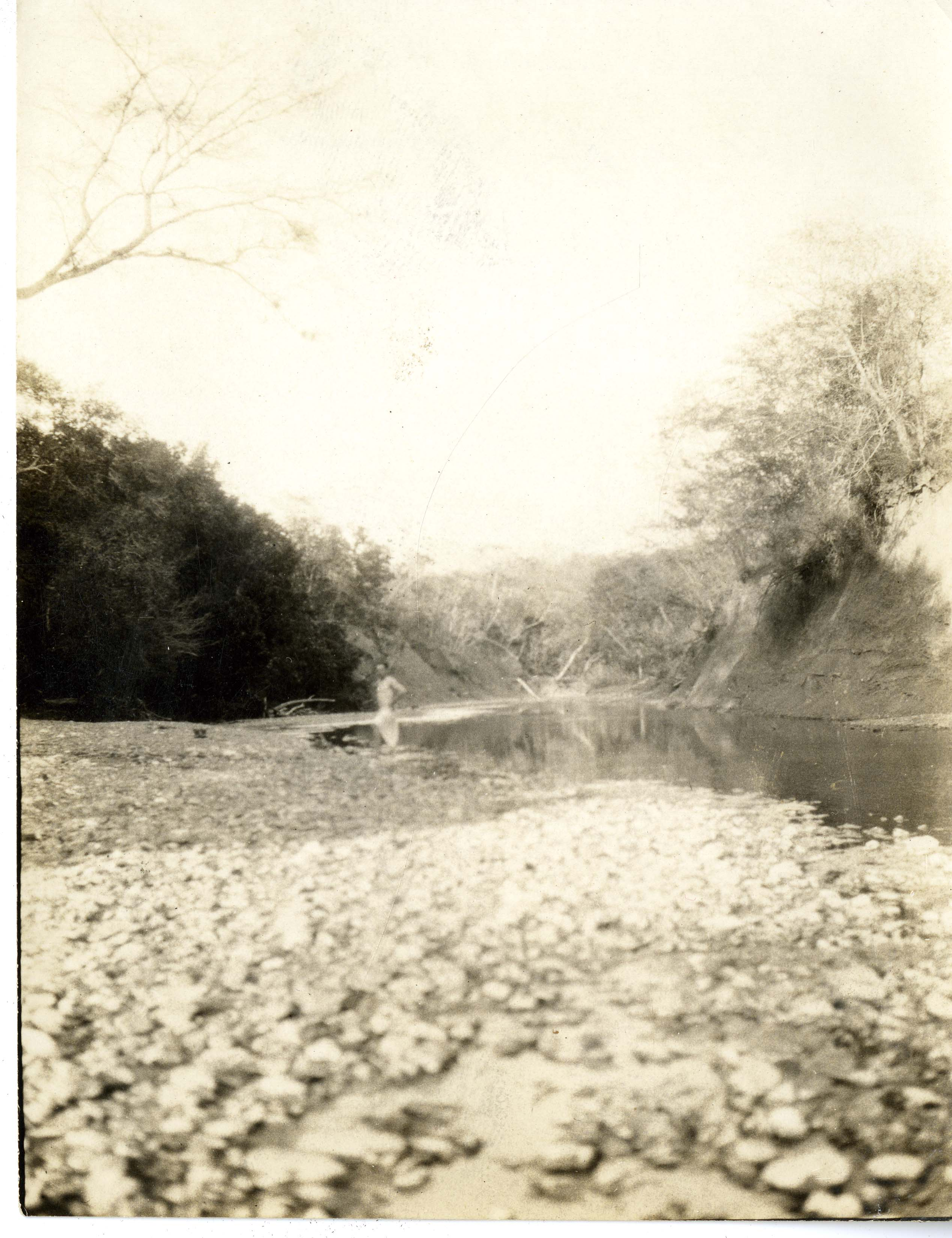
- Interactive map of Cerca-la-Source
- Location in Haiti
- Coordinates: 19°10′0″N 71°47′0″W
- Country: Haiti
- Department: Centre
- Arrondissement: Cerca-la-Source

Area
  - Total: 345 km^{2} (133 sq mi)
- Elevation: 371 m (1,217 ft)

Population (2015)
  - Total: 56,532
  - Density: 164/km^{2} (424/sq mi)
- Time zone: UTC−05:00 (EST)
  - Summer (DST): UTC−04:00 (EDT)
- Postal code: HT 5410

Cerca-la-Source (French pronunciation: [sɛʁka la suʁs]; Haitian Creole: Sèka Lasous) is a commune in the Cerca-la-Source Arrondissement, in the Centre department of Haiti.
