= Michel Clérié =

Haitian senator

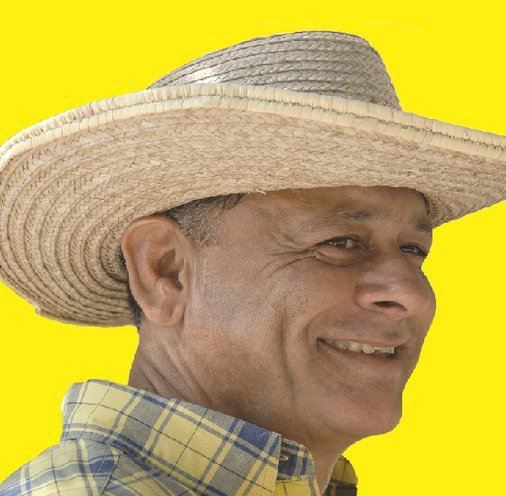
Michel Clérié in 2006.

Michel Clérié (born 28 September 1947), is a Haitian senator for the district of the Grand'Anse department. He is a member of the finance, industry, tourism, and public works committees.

== Biography ==
Michel Clérié was born in Haiti on 28 September 1947, and attended Institution Saint-Louis de Gonzague high school; he later attended Roger Anglade College, and after went to New York where he studied business administration. He returned to Haiti in 1974 and created and presided Fishermen Quarters S.A., a leading company in the fishing industry.

In 2005, he won the senatorial election for his department and served within parliament for six years. During that time, he was president of the Commerce Industry and Tourism Committee and also a member of Justice and Public Works Committee. During his electoral campaign, he was widely supported by the local population in the Grand'Anse department, especially the farmers and fishermen, with whom he still works closely. He is the special advisor of President Michel Martelly.

He is the son of Guy Clérié, a former army captain, and of Ginette Laroche, the daughter of an aristocratic family of the northern part of the country (Cap-Haïtien). He married Joelle Baker, whose father owned a distillery company; they have four children Guy Michel, David, Gregory and Dimitri, the two eldests were also former candidates to the Haitian Parliament.

He was trapped in rubble at the senate following the 2010 Haiti earthquake, but was found alive after several hours.
