= Lascahobas Arrondissement =

Coordinates: 18.8167°N 71.9333°W

Lascahobas Arrondissement Arrondissement de Lascahobas Awondisman Laskawobas
- Arrondissement
- Interactive map of Lascahobas Arrondissement
- Country: Haiti
- Department: Centre

Area
  - Arrondissement: 623.16 km^{2} (240.60 sq mi)
  - Urban: 5.2 km^{2} (2.0 sq mi)
  - Rural: 617.96 km^{2} (238.60 sq mi)

Population (2015)
  - Arrondissement: 168,685
  - Density: 270.69/km^{2} (701.09/sq mi)
  - Urban: 31,126
  - Rural: 137,559
- Time zone: UTC-5 (Eastern)
- Postal code: HT53—
- Communes: 4
- Communal Sections: 12
- IHSI Code: 063

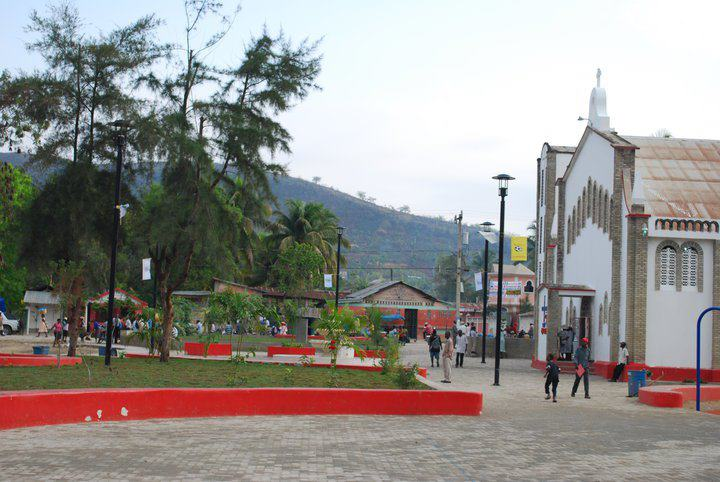
Lascahobas’ public square

Lascahobas (French pronunciation: [laskaɔbas]; Haitian Creole: Laskawobas) is an arrondissement in the Centre department of Haiti. As of 2015, the population was 168,685 inhabitants. Postal codes in the Lascahobas Arrondissement start with the number 53.

The arrondissement consists of the following communes:

- Lascahobas
- Belladère
- Savanette
- Baptiste
