= Maïssade =

Maïssade Mayisad
- Commune
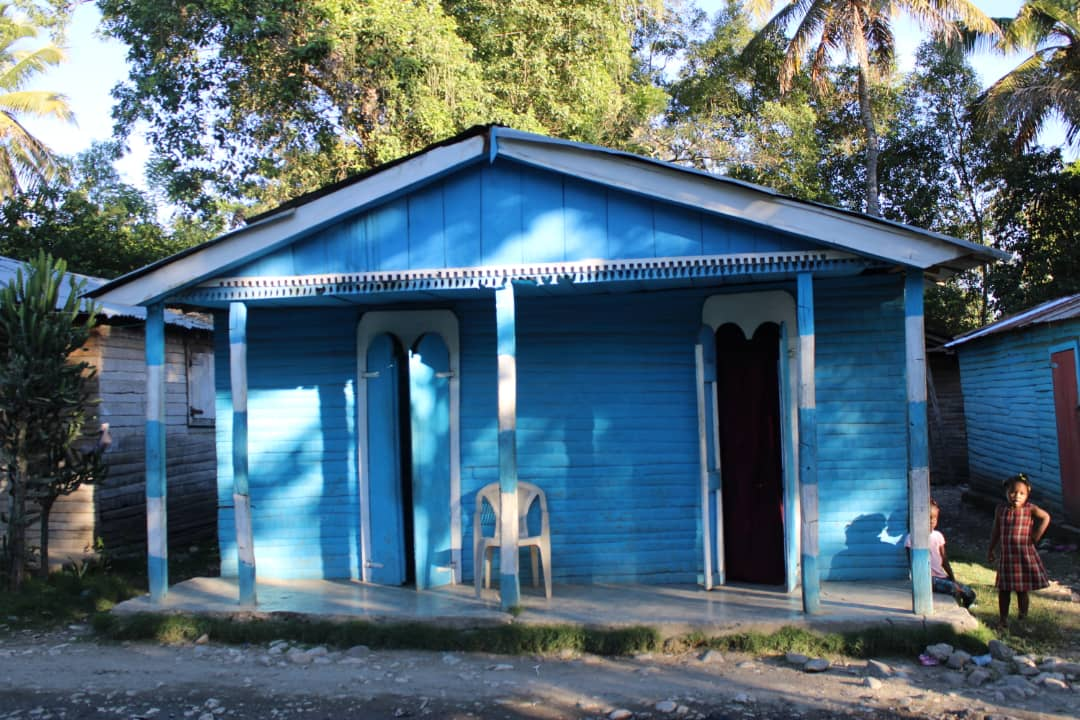
- Interactive map of Maïssade
- Location in Haiti
- Coordinates: 19°10′0″N 72°8′0″W
- Country: Haiti
- Department: Centre
- Arrondissement: Hinche

Area
  - Total: 288.43 km^{2} (111.36 sq mi)
- Elevation: 297 m (974 ft)

Population (2015)
  - Total: 58,942
  - Density: 204.35/km^{2} (529.28/sq mi)
- Time zone: UTC−05:00 (EST)
  - Summer (DST): UTC−04:00 (EDT)
- Postal code: HT 5120

Maïssade (French pronunciation: [maisad]; Haitian Creole: Mayisad) is a commune in the Hinche Arrondissement, in the Centre department of Haiti. It has 58,942 inhabitants as of 2015.
