= Isidor Mercier =

Haitian politician

Isidor Joseph Mercier is a Haitian politician from Jérémie. He is a member of the Chamber of Deputies with the Assembly of Progressive National Democrats (RDNP) party.

Mercier co-sponsored an unsuccessful motion of no confidence against the prime minister, Jacques-Édouard Alexis, in February 2008.

During a meeting of the parliament on April 1, 2008, Mercier's handgun discharged and wounded a clerk, Antonio Celestin. Mercier was arguing with a fellow member of parliament who had accused him of corruption when the weapon fired and struck the clerk in the shoulder. Mercier claimed the gun fell and accidentally discharged when he bent down to pick it up. Reporters who witnessed the event stated that Mercier had been brandishing the gun during the debate, and it fired after he was bumped from behind. Other legislators accused Mercier of intentionally firing the weapon.
