= Haitian Heritage Museum =

Coordinates: 25°48′53″N 80°11′25″W

Haitian Museum Heritage
- Established: 2004
- Location: 4141 NE 2 Ave. # 105C, Miami, FL, USA 33137
- Type: Art museum
- Website: www.haitianheritagemuseum.org

The Haitian Heritage Museum Miami is located in Miami, Florida and exhibits art, culture and heritage from Haiti. The Haitian Heritage Museum is a non-profit organization committed to preserving and showcasing Haitian culture and heritage through works of art, artifacts, music, films, and literature. It is a testament to Miami having one of the largest Haitian communities outside of Haiti.

== History ==
It was founded in 2004 by Eveline Pierre and Serge Rodriguez. commemorating Haiti's Bicentennial. Haiti emancipated themselves with the leadership of Toussaint L'Ouverture and became the first independent black republic.

== Community Involvement ==
The Haitian Heritage Museum participated to Art Basel Miami 2012. The museum also hosted several events in celebration of Haitian Heritage Month.

== Website ==
- Official website
