= Cap-Haïtien =

Commune in the department of Nord, Haiti

Cap-Haïtien Kap Ayisyen (Haitian Creole) Guárico (Taíno) Cap-Français (Colonial mame) Cap-Henri (During the reign of King Henri I)
- Commune
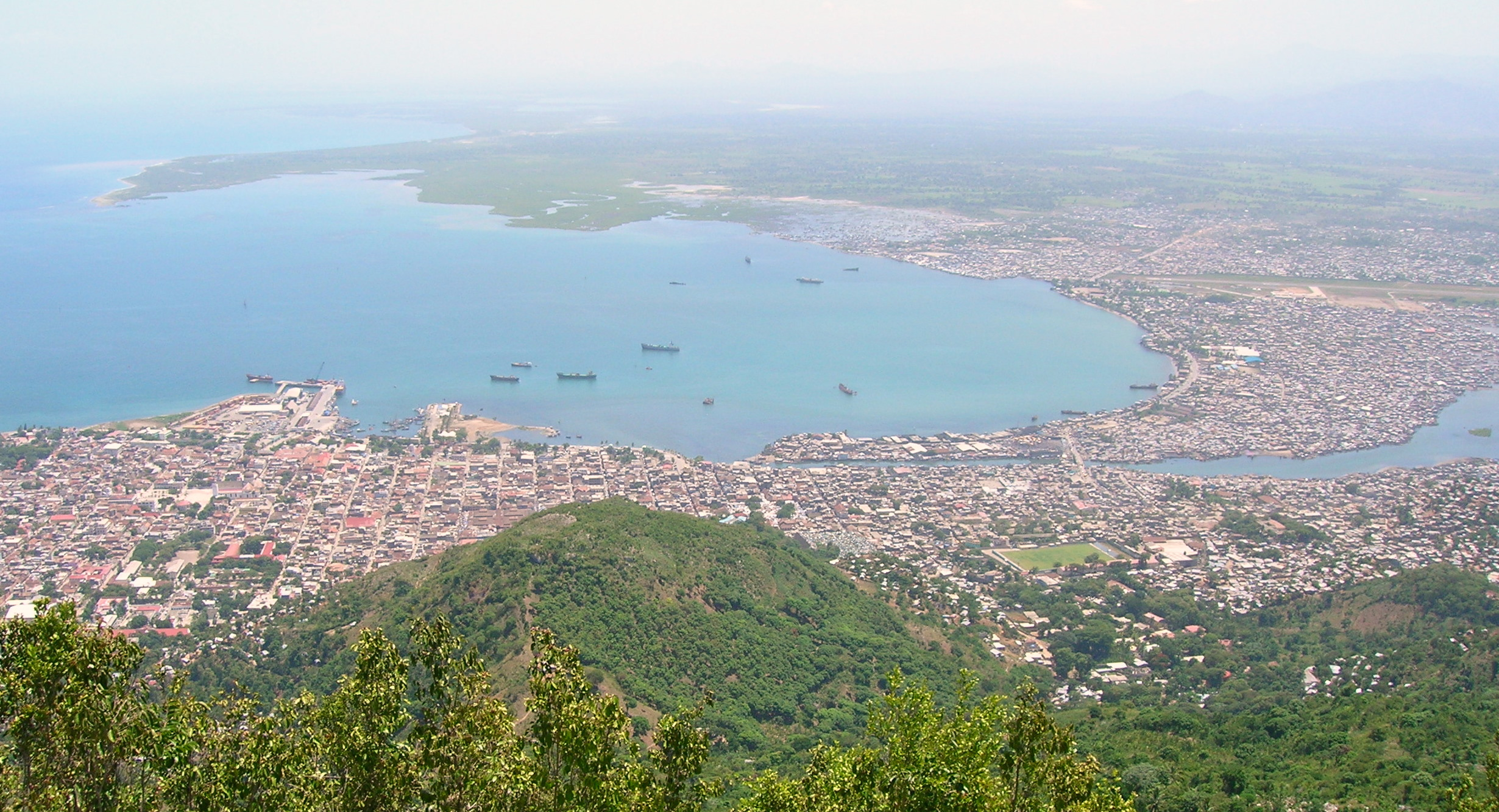
- View of Cap-Haïtien

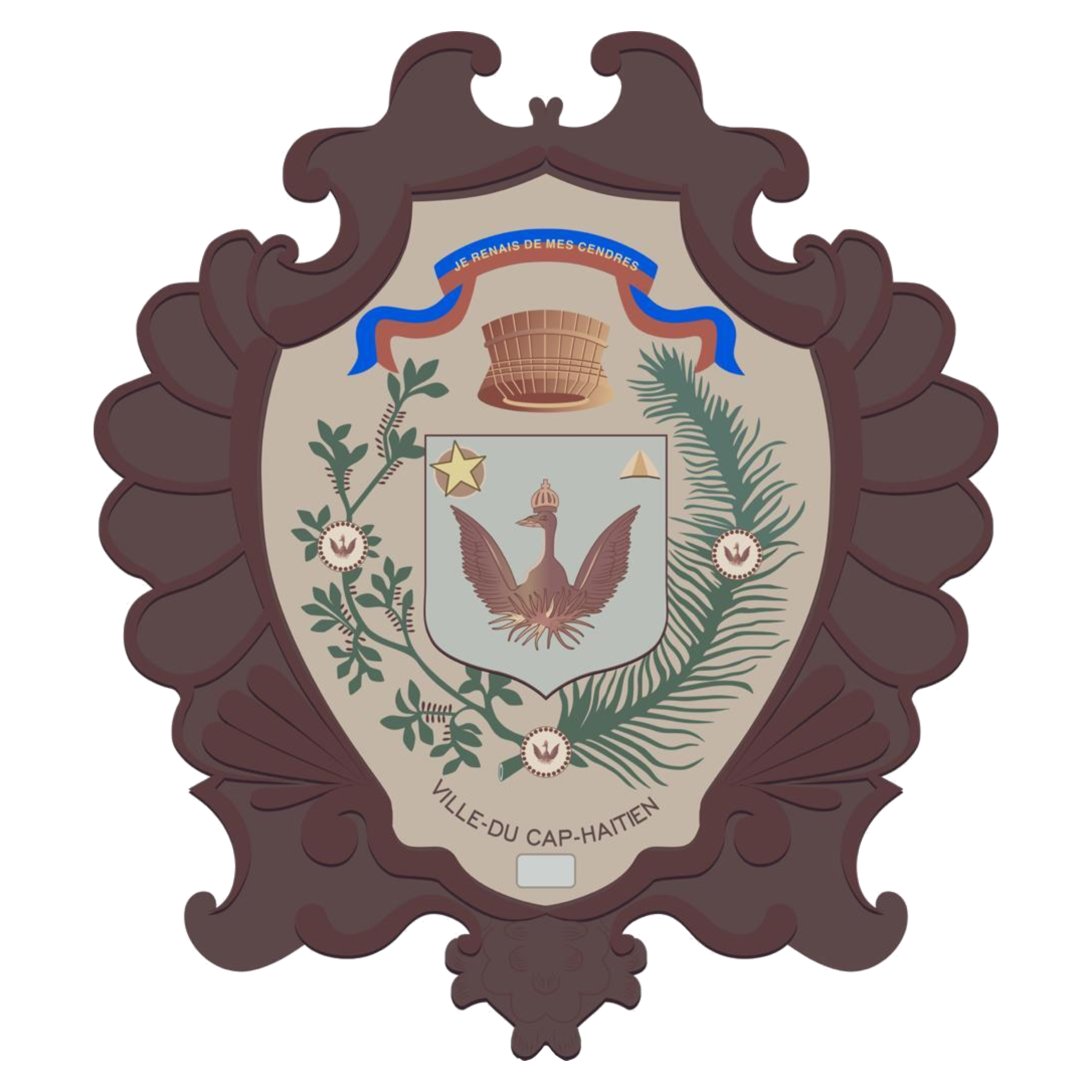
- Coat of arms
- Nicknames: Le Paris des Antilles; The Paris of the Antilles
- Location in Haiti
- Coordinates: 19°45′36″N 72°12′00″W
- Country: Haiti
- Department: Nord
- Commune: Cap-Haïtien
- Founded: 1670

Government
  - Mayor: Angie Bell

Area
  - Commune: 53.5 km^{2} (20.7 sq mi)
- Elevation: 0 m (0 ft)

Population (July 2024)
  - Commune: 301,506
  - Density: 5,640/km^{2} (14,600/sq mi)
  - Urban: 299,645
- Demonym: Capois(e)
- Time zone: UTC-05:00 (EST)
  - Summer (DST): UTC-04:00 (EDT)
- Website: https://visithaiti.com/destinations/cap-haitien-city-guide/

Cap-Haïtien (French: [kap a.isjɛ̃]; Haitian Creole: Kap Ayisyen, lit. 'Haitian Cape' or Okap) is a commune of about 300,000 people on the north coast of Haiti and the capital of the department of Nord. Previously named Cap‑Français (Haitian Creole: Kap-Fransè; initially Cap-François Haitian Creole: Kap-Franswa) and Cap‑Henri (Haitian Creole: Kap-Anri) during the rule of Henri I, it was historically nicknamed the Paris of the Antilles, because of its wealth and sophistication, expressed through its architecture and artistic life. It was an important city during the colonial period, serving as the capital of the French Colony of Saint-Domingue from the city's formal foundation in 1711 until 1770 when the capital was moved to Port-au-Prince. After the Haitian Revolution, it became the capital of the Kingdom of Haiti under King Henri I until 1820.

Cap-Haïtien's long history of independent thought was formed in part by its relative distance from Port-au-Prince, the barrier of mountains between it and the southern part of the country, and a history of large African populations. These contributed to making it a legendary incubator of independent movements since slavery times. For instance, from February 5–29, 2004, the city was taken over by militants who opposed the rule of the Haïtian president Jean-Bertrand Aristide. They eventually created enough political pressure to force him out of office and the country.

Cap-Haïtien is near the historic Haitian town of Milot, which lies 19 kilometres (12 mi) to the southwest. Milot was Haiti's first capital under the self-proclaimed King Henri Christophe, who ascended to power in 1807, three years after Haiti had gained independence from France. He renamed Cap‑Français as Cap‑Henri. Milot is the site of his Sans-Souci Palace, wrecked by the 1842 earthquake. The Citadelle Laferrière, a massive stone fortress bristling with cannons, atop a nearby mountain is eight kilometres (5 mi) away. On clear days, its silhouette is visible from Cap‑Haïtien.

The small Cap-Haïtien International Airport, located on the southeast edge of the city, is served by several small domestic airlines. It was patrolled by Chilean UN troops from the "O'Higgins Base" after the 2010 earthquake. Several hundred UN personnel, including nearby units from Nepal and Uruguay, were assigned to the city during the 2010–2017 United Nations Stabilization Mission in Haiti (MINUSTAH). The airport was the only functioning international airport in the country after the closure of the Toussaint Louverture International Airport in Tabarre in March 2024 amidst gang violence in Haiti. Significant migration from the capital occurred during the Haitian crisis, putting strain on infrastructure and on the educational system.

The destruction in 2020 of Shada 2 (a slum with 1,500 homes in the southern part of the city) was credited with disrupting gang activity in the former capital.

== History ==
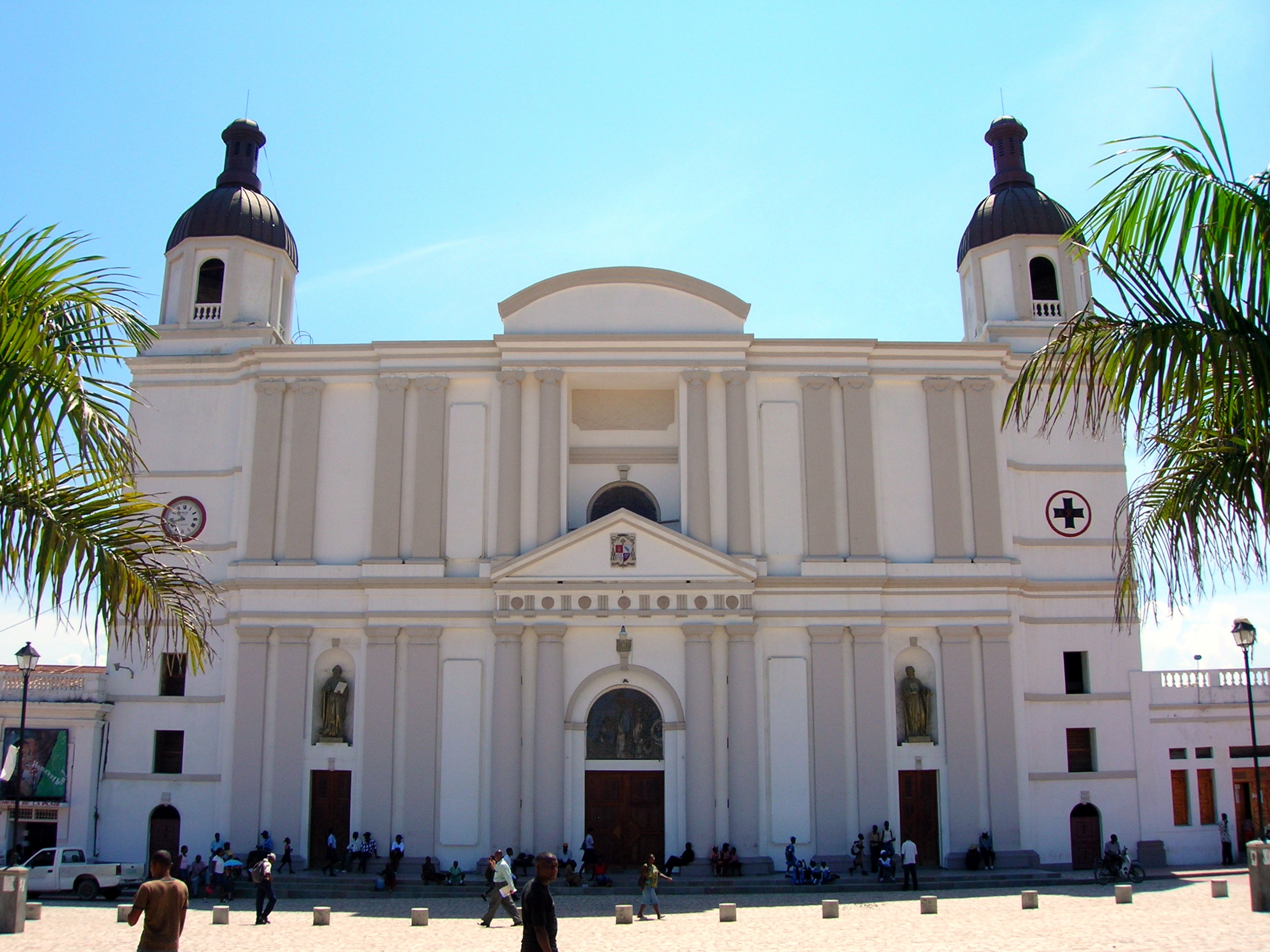
The well-preserved Cathedral Notre-Dame of Cap‑Haïtien

The island was occupied for thousands of years by cultures of indigenous peoples, who had migrated from present-day Central and South America. In the 16th century, Spanish explorers in the Caribbean began to colonize Hispaniola. They adopted the native Taíno name Guárico for the area that is today known as "Cap‑Haïtien". Due to the introduction of new infectious diseases, as well as poor treatment, the indigenous peoples population rapidly declined.

On the nearby coast Christopher Columbus founded his first community in the New World, the short-lived La Navidad. In 1975, researchers found near Cap‑Haïtien another of the first Spanish towns of Hispaniola: Puerto Real was founded in 1503. It was abandoned in 1578, and its ruins were not discovered until late in the twentieth century.

In 1670 during the French colonial period, Cap-Haïtien, or Cap-Français as the settlement was then known, was founded by a dozen colonists-adventurers under the command of Bertrand d'Ogeron.

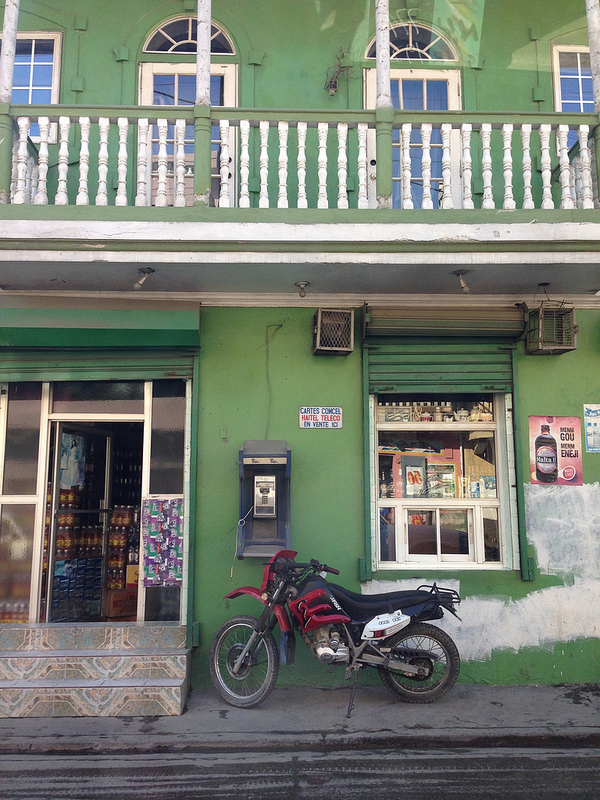
A street scene in Cap‑Haïtien

The French occupied roughly a third of the island of Hispaniola from the Spanish in the early eighteenth century. They established large sugar cane plantations on the northern plains and imported tens of thousands of African slaves to work them. Cap‑Français became an important port city of the French colonial period and the colony's main commercial centre. It served as the capital of the French colony of Saint-Domingue from the city's formal founding in 1711 until 1770, when the capital was moved to Port-au-Prince on the west coast of the island. Two thirds of the 15,000 inhabitants in 1790 were enslaved peoples, the remaining one third made up of colonists (24%) and free people of colour (10%). After the slave revolution, this was the first capital of the Kingdom of Haiti under King Henri I, when the nation was split apart.

The central area of the city is between the Bay of Cap‑Haïtien to the east and nearby mountainsides, as well as the Acul Bay, to the west; these are increasingly dominated by flimsy urban slums. The streets are generally narrow and arranged in grids. As a legacy of the United States' occupation of Haiti from 1915 to 1934, Cap‑Haïtien's north–south streets were renamed as single letters (beginning with Rue A, a major avenue) and going to "Q", and its east–west streets with numbers from 1 to 26; the system is not followed outside the central city, where French names predominate. The historic city has numerous markets, churches, and low-rise apartment buildings (of three–four storeys), constructed primarily before and during the U.S. occupation. Much of the infrastructure is in need of repair. Many such buildings have balconies on the upper floors, which overlook the narrow streets below.

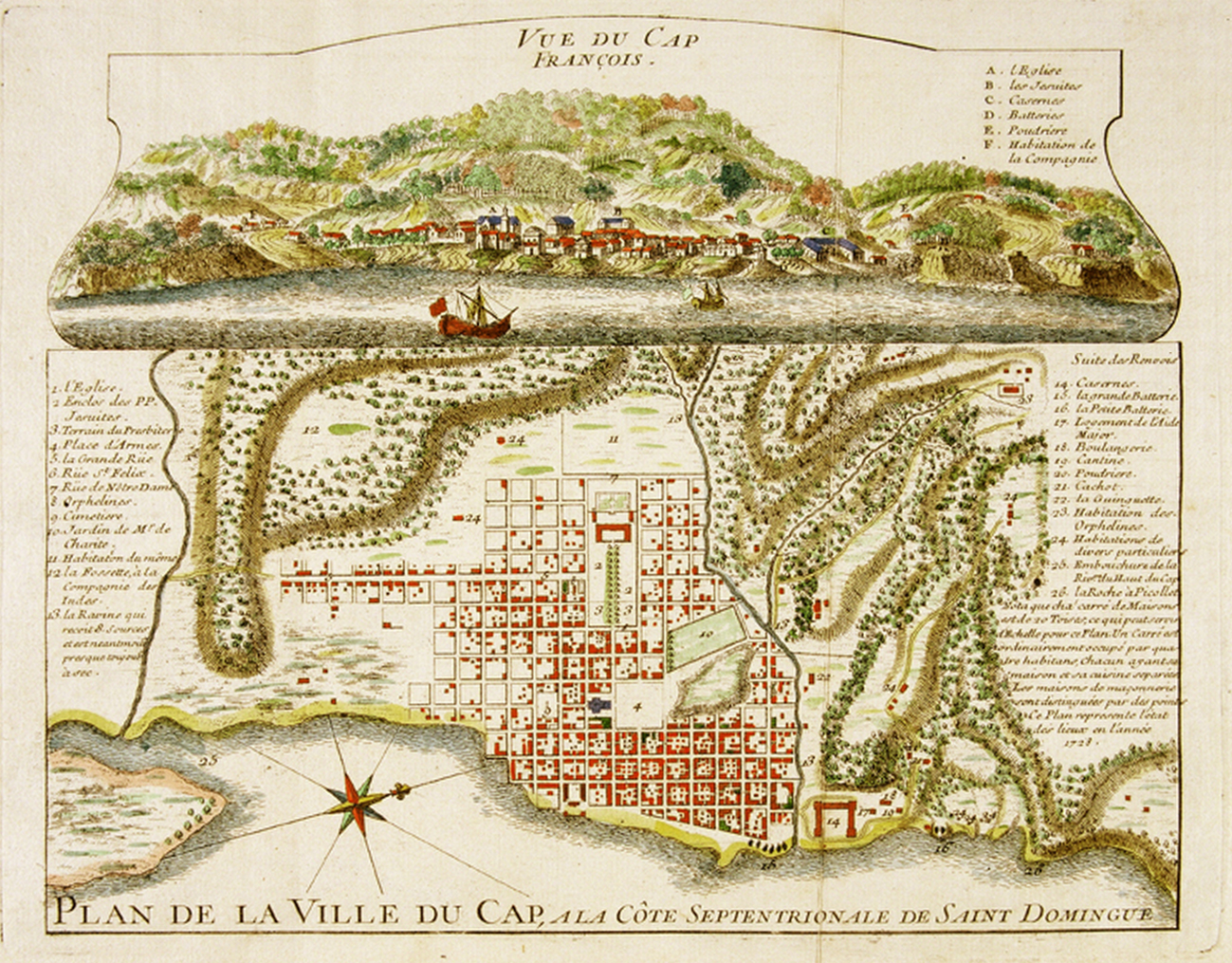
Engraving of Cap-Français in 1728

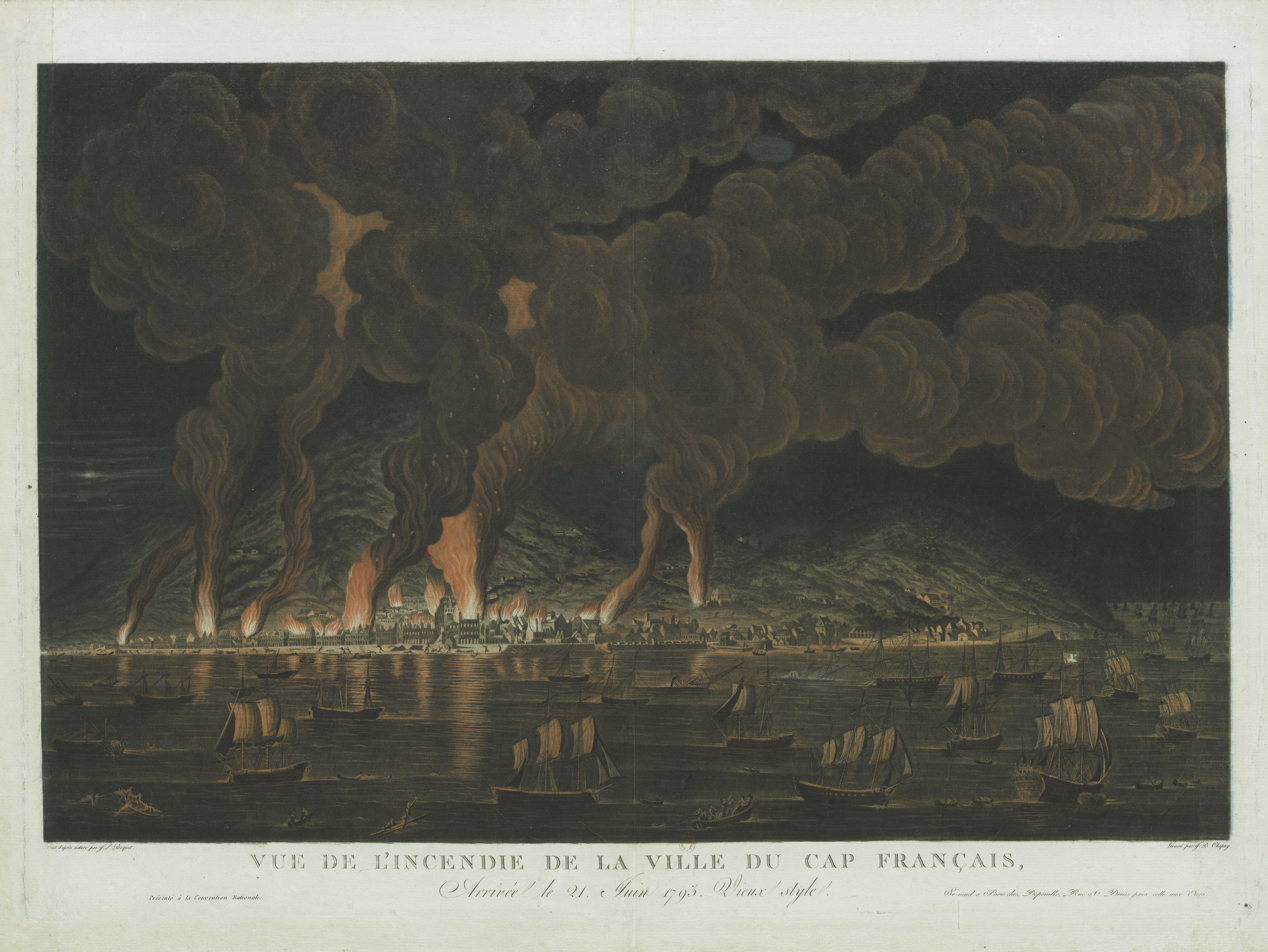
Fire of Cap Français, 21 June 1793

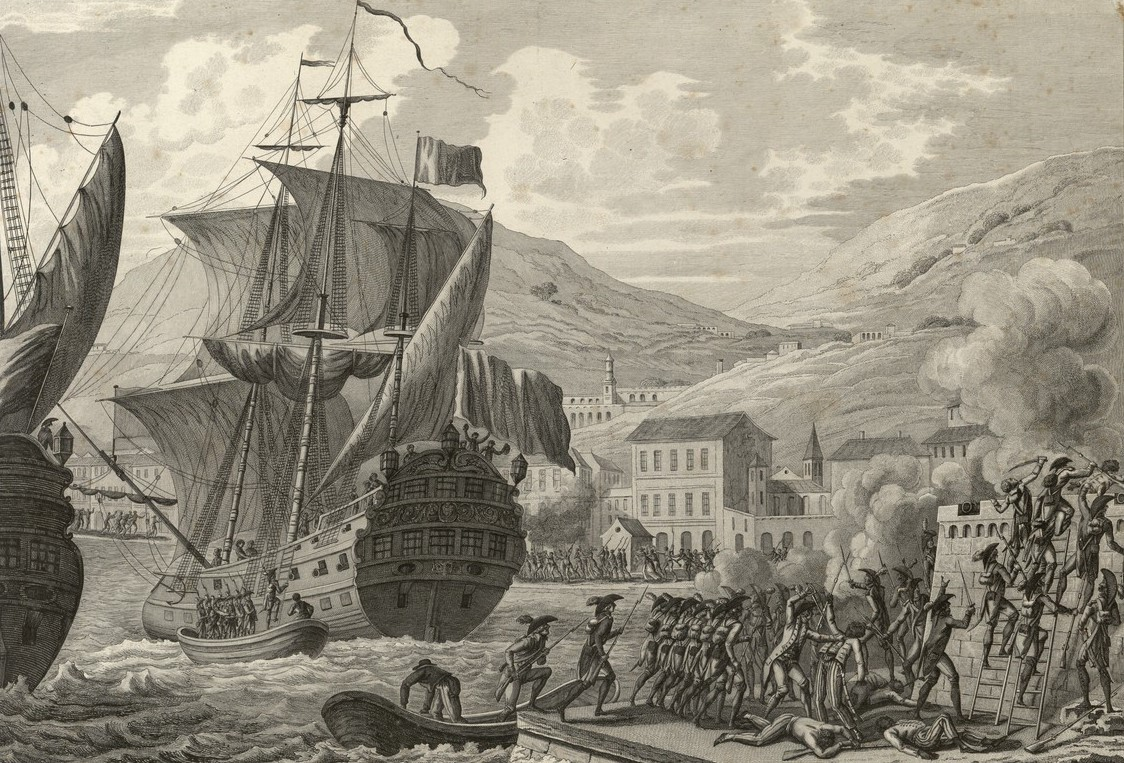
The French army led by Le Clerc lands in Cap Français (1802)

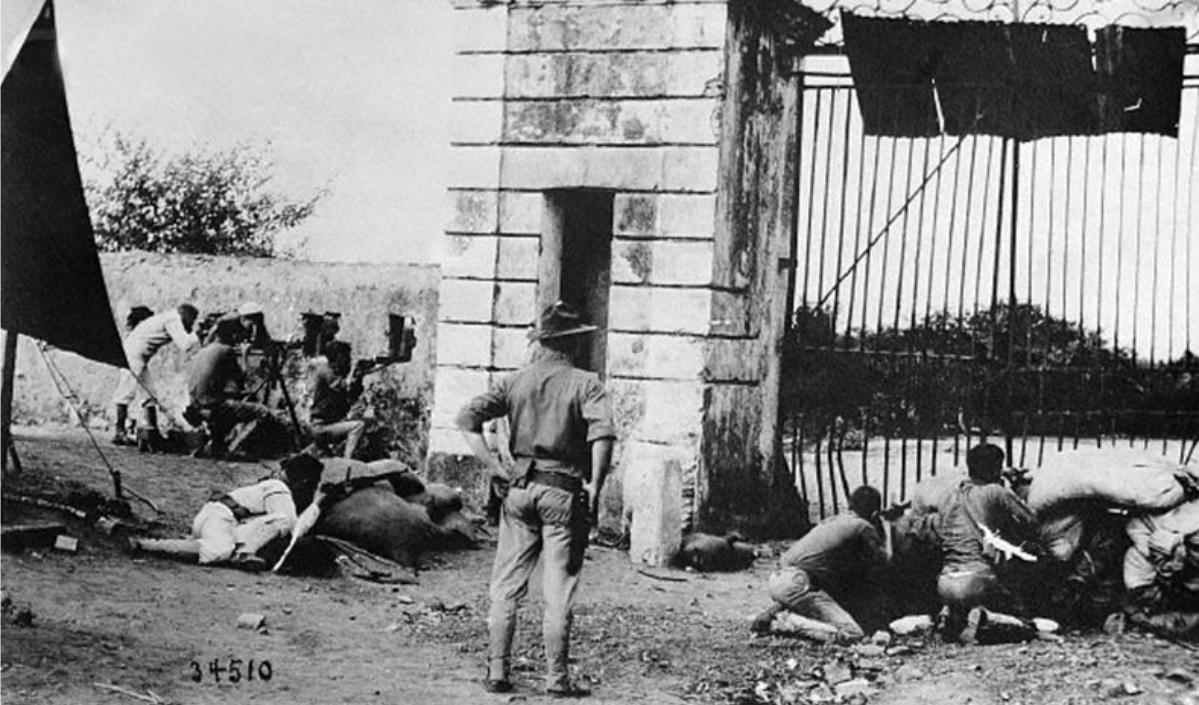
American Marines in 1915 defending the entrance gate in Cap-Haïten

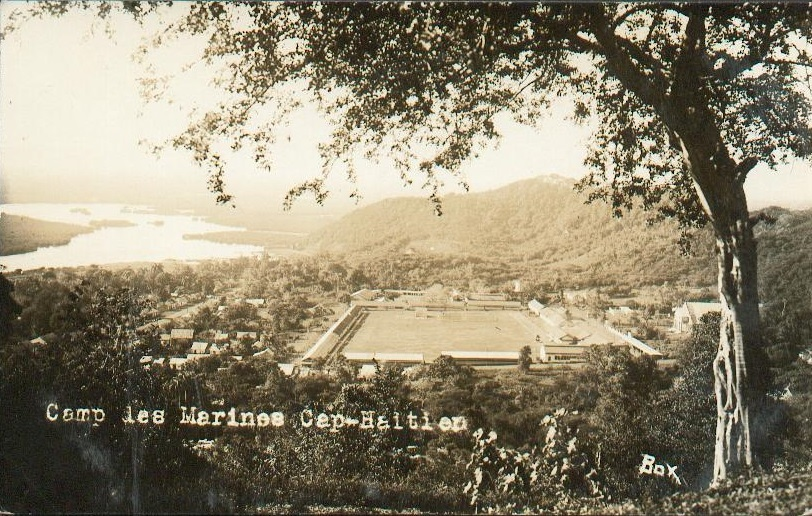
Marine's base at Cap-Haïtien

== Geography ==
The commune consists of three communal sections, namely:

- Bande du Nord, urban (part of the commune of Cap-Haïtien) and rural
- Haut du Cap, urban (part of the commune of Cap-Haïtien) and rural
- Petit Anse, urban (commune of Petit Anse) and rural

== Economy ==
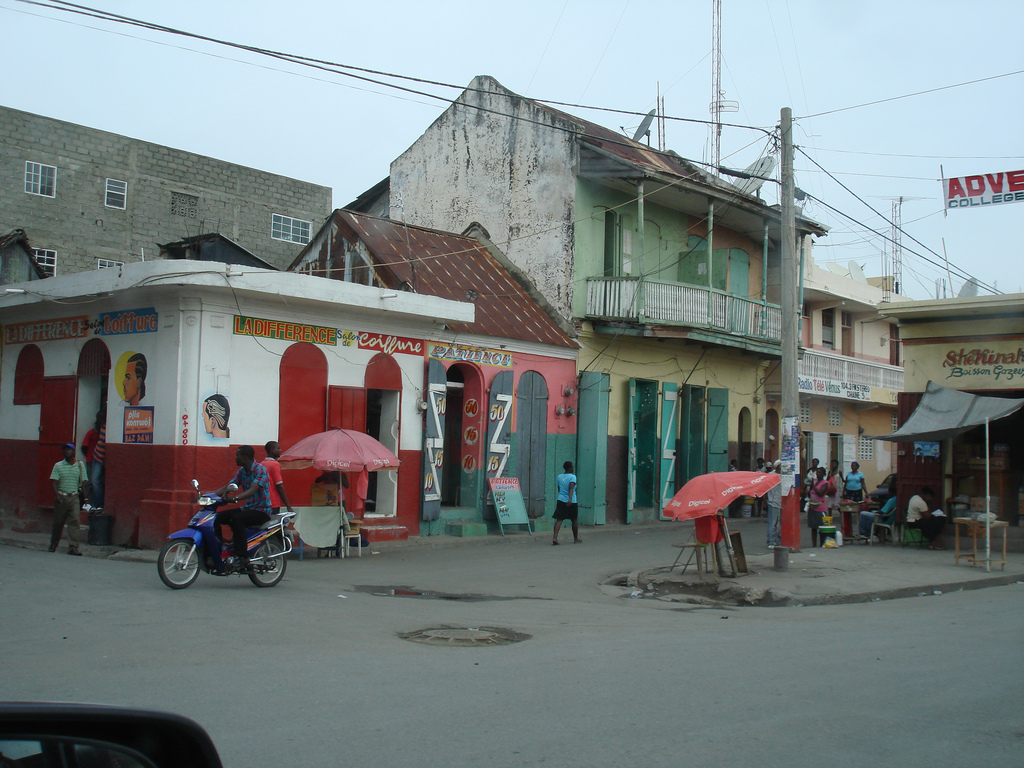
19th Century Architecture in Cap-Haitien

Cap-Haïtien is known as the nation's largest center of historic monuments and as such, it is a tourist destination. The bay, beaches and monuments have made it a resort and vacation destination for Haiti's upper classes, comparable to Pétion-Ville. Cap‑Haïtien has also attracted more international tourists at times, as it has been isolated from the political instability in the south of the island.

It has a wealth of 19th century architecture, which has been well preserved. During and after the Haitian Revolution many craftsmen from then Cap‑Français who were free people of color, fled to French-controlled New Orleans. Later in 1842 Cap-Haitien was devastated by an earthquake and a resulting tsunami, and most of the reconstruction was influenced by the globally popular French-style steel frame architecture. As a result, New Orleans and Cap-Haïtien share many similarities in styles of architecture. Especially notable are the gingerbread houses lining the city's older streets.

Since 2021, there have been significant electrical outages in Cap-Haitien, due in large part to a lack of fuel. Those who can afford it have invested in solar energy. A power plant built in Caracol to provide electricity to the Industrial Park reaches as far as Limonade 30 minutes from downtown Cap Haïtien.

== Tourism ==
=== Labadie and other beaches ===
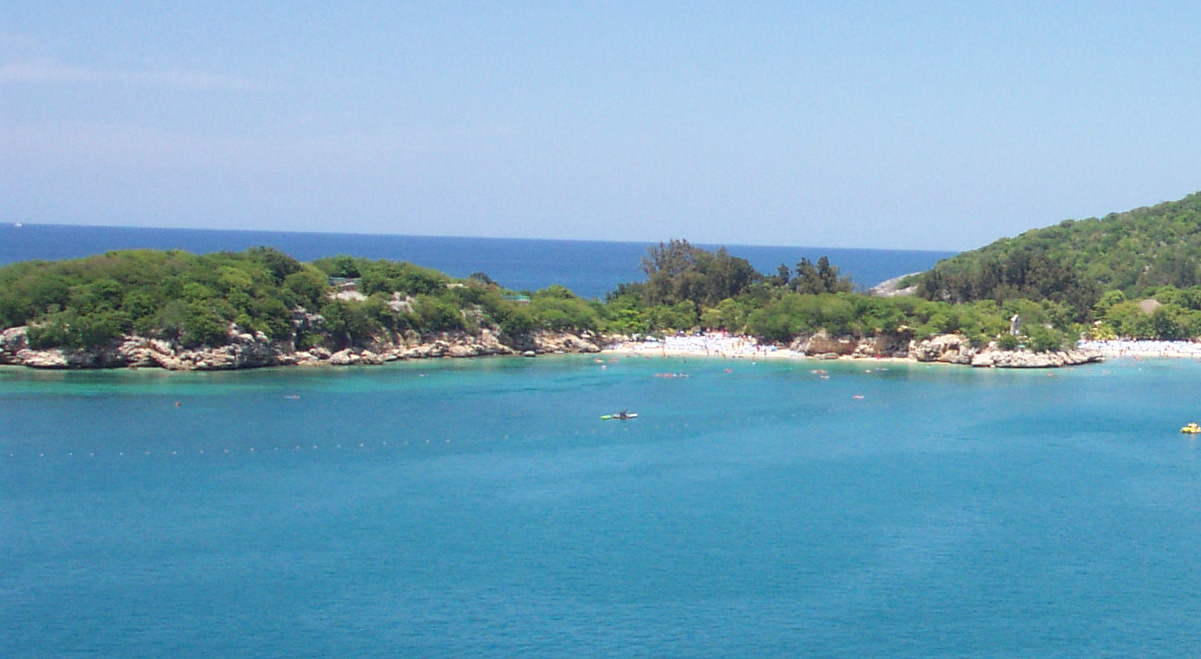
Labadie beach and village

The walled Labadie (or Labadee) beach resort compound is located ten kilometres (6 mi) to the city's northwest. It serves as a brief stopover for Royal Caribbean International (RCI) cruise ships. Major RCI cruise ships dock weekly at Labadie. It is a private resort leased by RCI, which has generated the largest proportion of tourist revenue to Haiti since 1986. It employs 300 locals, allows another 200 to sell their wares on the premises, and pays the Haitian government US$6 per tourist.

The resort is connected to Cap‑Haïtien by a mountainous, recently paved road. RCI has built a pier at Labadie, completed in late 2009, capable of servicing the luxury-class large ships.

Attractions include a Haitian market, numerous beaches, watersports, a water-oriented playground, and a zip-line.

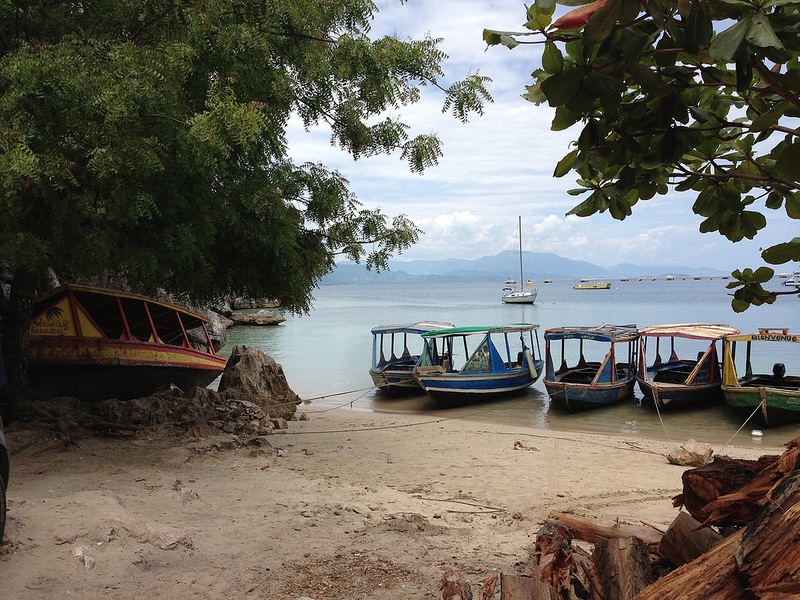
Water taxis parked at Labadie beach

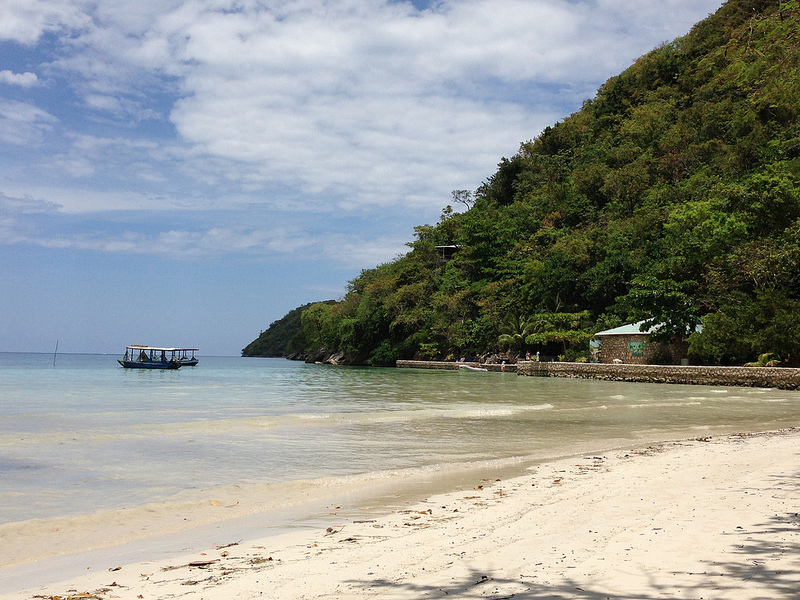
A view of the beach at Paradis

Cormier Plage is another beach on the way to Labadie, and there are also water taxis from Labadie to other beaches, like Paradis beach. In addition, Belli Beach is a small sandy cove with boats and hotels. Labadie village can be visited from here.

=== Vertières ===
Vertières is the site of the Battle of Vertières, the last and defining battle of the Haitian Revolution. On November 18, 1803, the Haitian army led by Jean-Jacques Dessalines defeated a French colonial army led by the Comte de Rochambeau. The French withdrew their remaining 7,000 troops (many had died from yellow fever and other diseases), and in 1804, Dessalines' revolutionary government declared the independence of Haiti. The revolution had been underway, with some pauses, since the 1790s. In this last battle for independence, rebel leader Capois La Mort survived all the French bullets that nearly killed him. His horse was killed under him, and his hat fell off, but he kept advancing on the French, yelling, "En avant!" (Go forward!) to his men. He has become renowned as a hero of the revolution. The 18 of November has been widely celebrated since then as a Day of Army and Victory in Haiti.

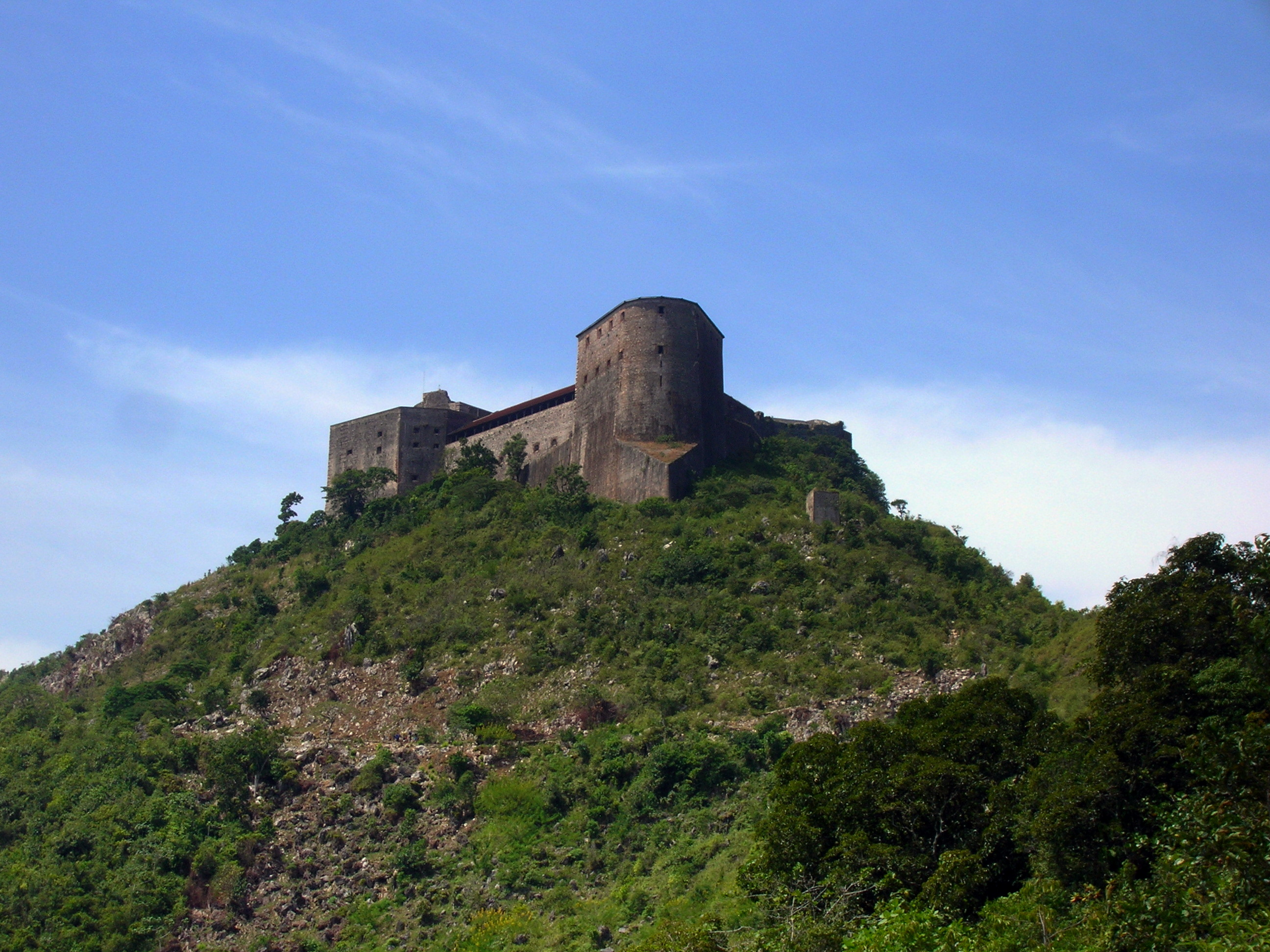
View of the Citadelle Laferrière, in northern Haiti

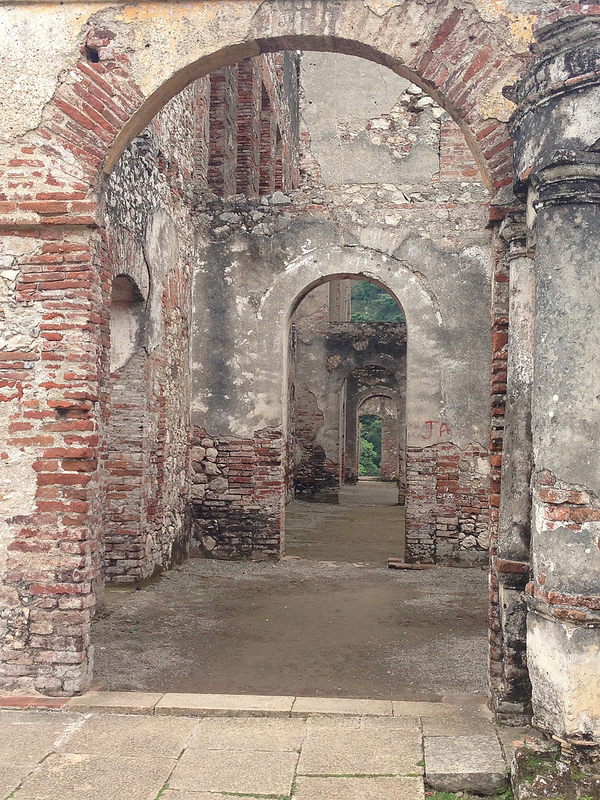
Inside the ruins of Sans-Souci Palace

=== Citadelle Henry and Sans-Souci Palace ===
The Citadelle Laferrière, also known as Citadelle Henry, or the Citadelle, is a large mountaintop fortress located approximately 27 kilometres (17 mi) south of the city of Cap‑Haïtien and eight kilometres (5 mi) beyond the town of Milot. It is the largest fortress in the Americas, and was listed by UNESCO as a World Heritage Site in 1982 along with the nearby Sans-Souci Palace. The Citadel was built by Henri Christophe, a leader during the Haitian slave rebellion and self-declared King of Northern Haiti, after the country gained its independence from France in 1804. Together with the remains of his Sans-Souci Palace, damaged in the 1842 earthquake, Citadelle Henry has been designated as a UNESCO World Heritage Site.

=== Bois Caïman ===
Bois Caïman (Haitian Creole: Bwa Kayiman), three kilometres (2 mi) south of road RN 1, is the place where Vodou rites were performed under a tree at the beginning of the slave revolution. For decades, maroons had been terrorizing slaveholders on the northern plains by poisoning their food and water. Makandal is the legendary (and perhaps historical) figure associated with the growing resistance movement. By the 1750s, he had organized the maroons, as well as many people enslaved on plantations, into a secret army. Makandal was murdered (or disappeared) in 1758, but the resistance movement grew.

At Bois Caïman, a maroon leader named Dutty Boukman held the first mass antislavery meeting secretly on August 14, 1791. At this meeting, a Vodou ceremony was performed, and all those present swore to die rather than to endure the continuation of slavery on the island. Following the ritual led by Boukman and a mambo named Cécile Fatiman, the insurrection started on the night of August 22–23, 1791. Boukman was killed in an ambush soon after the revolution began. Jean-François was the next leader to follow Dutty Boukman in the uprising of the slaves, the Haitian equivalent of the storming of the Bastille in the French Revolution. Slaves burned the plantations and cane fields, and massacred French colonists across the northern plains. They also attacked Cap-Français and some of the free people of color. Eventually the revolution gained the independence of Haiti from France and freedom for the slaves. The site of Dutty Boukman's ceremony is marked by a ficus tree. Adjoining it is a colonial well, which is credited with mystic powers.

=== Morne Rouge ===
Morne Rouge is eight kilometres (5 mi) to the south of Cap. It is the site of the sugar plantation known as "Habitation Le Normand de Mezy", known for several slaves who led the rebellion against the French.

== Disasters ==
=== 1842 Cap-Haïtien earthquake ===
On 7 May 1842, an earthquake destroyed most of the city and other towns in the north of Haiti and the neighboring Dominican Republic. Among the buildings destroyed or significantly damaged was the Sans-Souci Palace. Ten thousand people were killed in the earthquake. Its magnitude is estimated as 8.1 on the Richter scale.

=== 2010 Haiti earthquake ===
In the wake of the 2010 Haiti earthquake, which destroyed port facilities in Port-au-Prince, the Port international du Cap-Haïtien was used to deliver relief supplies by ship.

As the city's infrastructure suffered little damage, numerous businessmen and many residents have moved here from Port-au-Prince. The airport is patrolled by Chilean UN troops since the 2010 earthquake, and several hundred UN personnel have been assigned to the city as part of the ongoing United Nations Stabilization Mission in Haiti (MINUSTAH). They are working on recovery throughout the island.

After the earthquake, the port of Labadee was demolished and the pier enlarged and completely re-paved with concrete, which now allows larger cruise ships to dock, rather than tendering passengers to shore.

=== Cap-Haïtien fuel tanker explosion ===
On 14 December 2021, over 75 people were killed when a fuel tank truck overturned and later exploded in the Samari neighborhood of Cap-Haïtien.

== Transportation ==
=== Airports ===
Cap-Haïtien is served by the Cap-Haïtien International Airport (CAP), Haiti's second busiest airport. It was a hub for Salsa d'Haïti prior to its cessation in 2013. American Airlines operated international flights to CAP for a number of years, but canceled their last connection in July, 2020, after the COVID-19 pandemic significantly reduced passenger demand. American Airlines was the last major US flight operator to provide service to CAP and thereby Northern Haiti—in July, 2020, Cap-Haïtien became only accessible by air travel through limited flights from Port-au-Prince's Toussaint Louverture International Airport. Spirit Airlines, which had previously canceled their service due to political unrest and low demand in 2019, announced in October, 2020 that they would resume limited service to CAP in December of the same year.

=== Seaport ===
The Port international du Cap-Haïtien is Cap-Haïtien's main seaport. USAID financed $24 million of works to renovate the port beginning in May 2024. The port is for industrial cruise ships come in at Labadee nearby to the north west which is operated exclusively by and for Royal Caribbean.

=== Roads ===
The Route Nationale 1 connects Cap-Haïtien with the Haitian capital city Port-au-Prince via the cities of Saint-Marc and Gonaïves.

The Route Nationale 3 also connects Cap-Haïtien with Port-au-Prince via the Central Plateau and the cities of Mirebalais and Hinche. Cap-Haïtien has one of the best grid systems in Haiti with its north–south streets were renamed as single letters (beginning with Rue A, a major avenue), and its east–west streets with numbers. The Boulevard du Cap-Haïtien (also called the Boulevard Carenage) is Cap‑Haïtien's main boulevard that runs along the Atlantic Ocean in the northern part of the city.

=== Public transportation ===
Cap-Haïtien is served by tap tap and local taxis or motorcycles.

== Health ==
Cap-Haïtien is served by the teaching hospital: Hôpital Universitaire Justinien.

== Education ==
A union of four Catholic Church private schools have been present for two decades in Cap‑Haïtien. They have higher-level grades, equivalent to the lycées that feed the Écoles Normale Supérieure in France. They have high standards of academic excellence, selectivity in admissions, and generally their students come from the social and economic elite. Also, the lyceé Philippe Guerrier that was built in 1844 by the Haitian President, Philippe Guerrier, has been a fountain of knowledge for more than a century.

- Collège Notre-Dame du Perpetuel Secours des Pères de Sainte-Croix
- Collège Regina Assumpta des Sœurs de Sainte-Croix
- École des Frères de l'instruction Chrétienne
- École Saint Joseph de Cluny des Sœurs Anne-Marie Javoue
- Lyceé Philippe Guerrier built by the Haitian President, Philippe Guerrier in 1844.

=== Universities ===
Cap-Haïtien is home to the Cap-Haïtien Faculty of Law, Economics and, Management; the Public University of the North in Cap-Haïtien (UPNCH). The new Université Roi Henry Christophe is nearby in Limonade.

== Sport ==
Cap-Haïtien has the Parc Saint-Victor home of three major league teams: Football Inter Club Association, AS Capoise, and Real du Cap.

== Media ==
=== Television ===
- Télé Vénus Ch 5
- Télé Paradis Ch 16
- Chaîne 6
- Chaîne 7
- Chaîne 11
- Télé Capoise Ch 8
- Télé Africa Ch 12
- HMTV Ch 20
- Télé Union Ch 22
- Télé Apocalypse Ch 24
- Télévision Nationale d'Haiti Ch 4

=== Radio stations ===
- Bon Déjeuner! Radio, an internet radio station in Haiti, broadcasting from Cap-Haitien.
- Radyo Atlantik, 92.5 FM
- Radio 4VEH (4VEF), 840 AM
- Radio 4VEH, 94.7 FM
- Radio 7 FM, 92.7 FM
- Radio Cap-Haïtien
- Radio Citadelle, 91.1 FM
- Radio Étincelle
- Radio Gamma, 99.7 (based in Fort-Liberté)
- Radio Lumière, 98.1 FM
- Radio Méga, 103.7 FM
- Radio Sans-Souci FM, 106.9 FM
- Radio VASCO, 93.7 FM
- Radio Vénus FM, 104.3 FM
- Sans Souci FM, 106.9
- Voix de l'Ave Maria, 98.5 FM
- Voix du Nord, 90.3 FM
- Radio Intermix, 93.1 FM: La Reference Radio en Haïti # 1
- Radio Paradis
- Radio Nirvana, 97.3 FM
- Radio Hispaniola
- Radio Maxima, 98.1.FM
- Radio Voix de l'ile, 94.5 FM
- Radio Digital, 101.3 FM
- Radio Oxygene, 103.3 FM
- Radio Passion, 101.7 FM Haïti
- Radio City Inter Haïti
- La Radio de l'éducation
- Radio Multivers FM Cap haitien
- Toujours plus hauts

== Notable natives ==
- Pierre Nord Alexis (1820 – 1910), President of Haiti, 1902–1908.
- Tancrède Auguste (1856 – 1913), the 20th President of Haiti, 1912–1913.
- Étienne Chavannes (born 1939), a Haitian painter of crowd scenes
- Tyrone Edmond, Haitian-born model.
- Arly Larivière, Haitian Kompa musician and composer
- Yolette Lévy (1938–2018), Haitian-born Canadian politician and activist
- Lewis Page Mercier (1820–1875), Haitian educator and educator
- Alfred Auguste Nemours (1883–1955), military historian and diplomat
- Philomé Obin (1892–1986), artist and painter
- Leonel Saint-Preux (born 1985), footballer, played 41 games for Haiti
- Bruny Surin (born 1967), track and field runner, Olympic medalist, lives in Canada
- Samuel Dameus (born 1986), media personality and filmmaker

== See also ==
- Battle of Cap-Français
