= Salsa d'Haïti =

SALSA d'Haïti
IATA	ICAO	Call sign
SO	SLC	SALSA
- Founded: 2008
- Ceased operations: 2013
- Hubs: Toussaint Louverture International Airport
- Fleet size: 1
- Destinations: 2
- Headquarters: Port-au-Prince, Haiti
- Key people: President and CEO Arienthiran Prakash; Executive vice president Ana-Maria Moreno; Director of operations Eric Felicie
- Website: flysalsa.com

SALSA d'Haïti was a Haitian regional airline headquartered at Toussaint Louverture International Airport in Port-au-Prince, Haiti. It flew several round trip flights daily between Cap-Haitien and Port-au-Prince.

== History ==
SALSA d'Haïti was a privately held airline formed in 2008 to provide service for travel within Haiti. SALSA d'Haïti held the IATA airline designator of SO (Sierra-Oscar), IATA accounting prefix of 340 and International Civil Aviation Organization (ICAO) airline designator of SLC (Sierra-Lima-Charlie). SALSA also participates in the International Air Transport Association (IATA) Multilateral Prorate Agency - Passenger (MPA-P) and is a signatory of the IATA Prorate Agency Agreement (PAA). SALSA is an acronym for Services Aeriens Latinosamericains, S.A d'Haïti (translated from French to English as "Latin American Air Services Corporation of Haiti").

While the primary focus of the airline was to serve the Haitian local population, international expansion was planned to further this goal to the large Haitian population living outside of Haiti while at the same time making foreign tourist travel to areas outside of Port-au-Prince available. SALSA had orders for additional turboprop aircraft to expand domestic operations to Port-de-Paix, Jérémie and Les Cayes. Additionally, jet-powered aircraft were to be added in 2011 to serve international destinations in Kingston, Jamaica and Ft. Lauderdale, Florida.

Shortly after the 2010 Haiti earthquake on January 12, 2010, SALSA d'Haïti began organizing relief efforts with several non-governmental organizations and foreign governments to assist in the transportation of supplies into Port-au-Prince and other Haitian communities outside of the capital. Relief flights were flown throughout Haiti, as well as supply flights from Santo Domingo, Aruba and Curaçao. Charter flights for the Royal Dutch Marines, from their base in Willemstad, Curaçao, were some of the first flights from outside the Haiti region.

In September 2011, SALSA d'Haïti was accepted as a member of the IATA Multilateral Interline Transport Agreement (MITA). The airline ceased operations in 2013.

== Destinations ==
SALSA d'Haïti Destinations
City	Country	Airport
Port-au-Prince	Haiti	Toussaint Louverture International Airport
Cap-Haïtien	Haiti	Hugo Chávez International Airport

SALSA maintained interline or codeshare agreements with the several airlines. Operations connected at Port-au-Prince where passengers had to transfer from the international airport to the domestic airport for onward transportation to domestic destinations. SALSA provided complementary transportation between the Port-au-Prince international and domestic terminals.

== Fleet ==
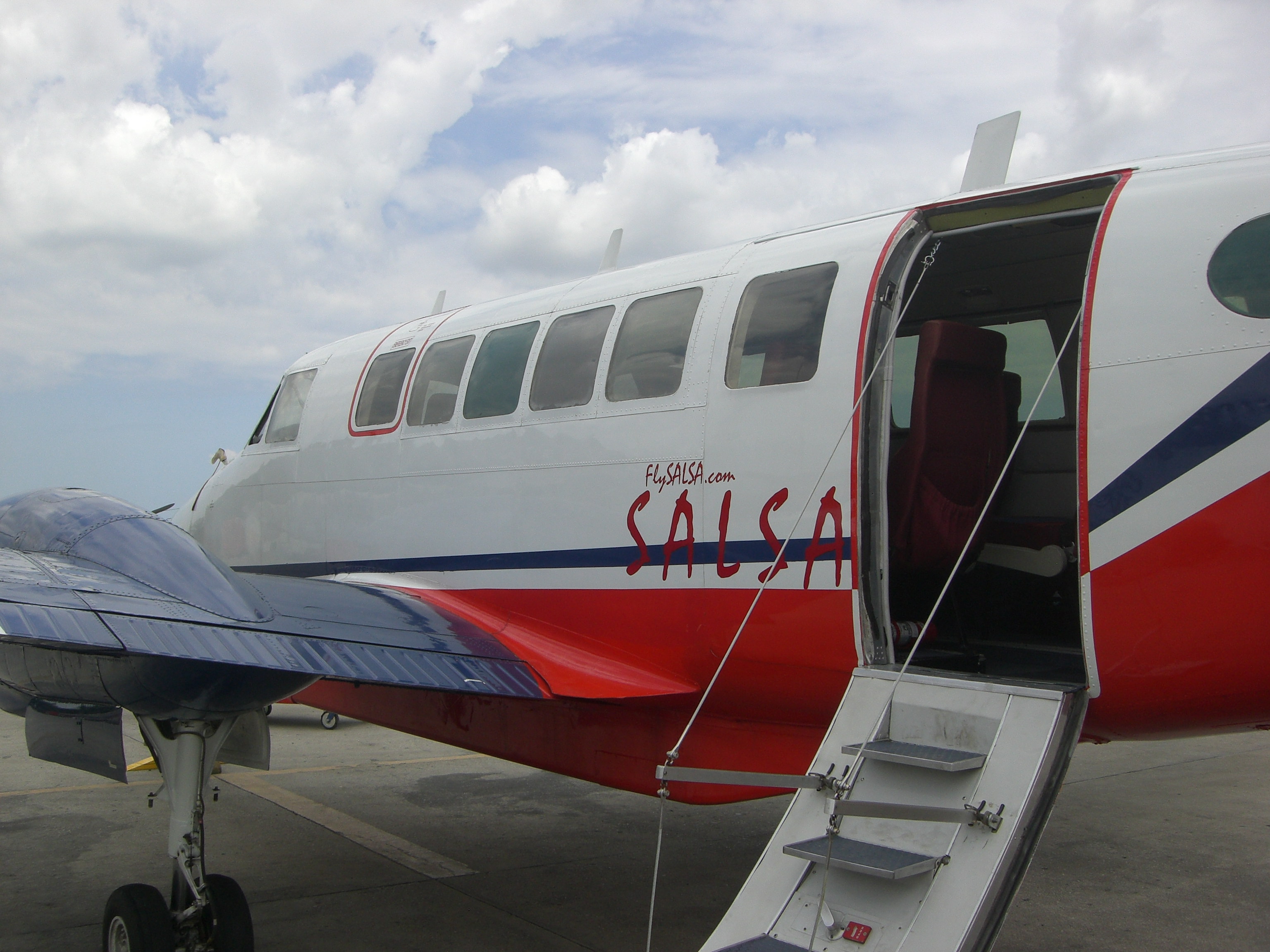
Salsa d'Haiti Beechcraft 99

At the time of its closure, the airline operated the following aircraft:

SALSA d'Haïti Fleet
Aircraft	In service	Orders	Passengers	Delivery Date
British Aerospace Jetstream J31	1	2	19	2008

=== Former fleet ===
Former SALSA d'Haïti Aircraft
Aircraft	Passengers	Removed from Fleet
SAAB 340A	30	2010
Beechcraft 99	12	2011
British Aerospace Jetstream J31	19	2013

== Incidents and accidents ==
- On February 13, 2011, a SALSA Jetstream 31 arriving in Port-au-Prince from Cap Haitien experienced issues with the left-wing landing gear locking into landing position due to a hydraulics system failure. After 30 minutes of attempting to drop the landing gear, the aircraft was forced to make an emergency landing with only two of the three wheels locked for landing. All 19 passengers and 2 crew members safely evacuated with minor injuries. The aircraft, HH-ANA, was significantly damaged.
- On September 20, 2011, a SALSA Beechcraft 99 went down outside of Cap Haitien. 2 pilots and 1 passenger were on board at the time of the incident, there were no survivors. Authorities are currently investigating the cause. This aircraft departed from Cap Haitien even though all but one passenger refused to go and other scheduled flights, including Tortug’Air, cancelled flights because of terrible weather conditions, between Cap Haitien and Port-au-Prince. Salsa flew into a violent cumulo nimbus shortly after takeoff and crashed.
