= State University of Haiti =

University in Haiti

Coordinates: 18°32′22.1″N 72°20′23.36″W

- Université d'État d'Haïti
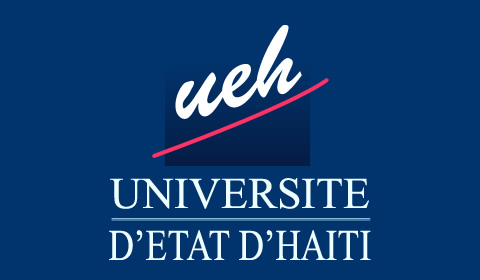
- Type: Public university
- Established: December 16, 1960; 65 years ago (1820s origin)
- Academic affiliations: RESCIF
- Rector: Fritz Deshommes
- Location: 10, Ave Magloire Ambroise, Port-au-Prince, Haiti
- Website: www.ueh.edu.ht

The State University of Haiti (French: Université d'État d'Haïti (UEH), Haitian Creole: Inivèsite Leta Ayiti) is one of Haiti's most prestigious institutions of higher education. It is located in Port-au-Prince.

Its origins date to the 1820s, when colleges of medicine and law were established. In 1942, the various faculties merged into the University of Haiti. After a student strike in 1960, François Duvalier's government brought the university under firm government control and renamed it the State University of Haiti. In 1983, the university became an independent institution according to the Haitian constitution. The university's independent status was confirmed in the Haitian constitution of 1987.

In 1981, there were 4,099 students at the University of Haiti, of whom 26% were enrolled in the School of Law and Economics, 25% in the School of Medicine and Pharmacy, 17% in the School of Administration and Management, and 11% in the School of Science and Topography. Despite the important role played by agriculture in the Haitian economy, only 5% of the university's students were enrolled in the School of Agronomy and Veterinary Medicine. In 1981, the University of Haiti had 559 professors, compared to 207 in 1967. Most professors worked part-time, were paid on an hourly basis, and had little time for contact with students. UEH also suffered severe shortages of books and other materials.

As of 2010, tuition was US$15 a year. However, while this made it more affordable for many Haitians than other forms of tertiary education in the country, competition for places was fierce. The university accepted only 15% of applicants for undergraduate places, while its dentistry school had just 20 places for about 800 applicants yearly.

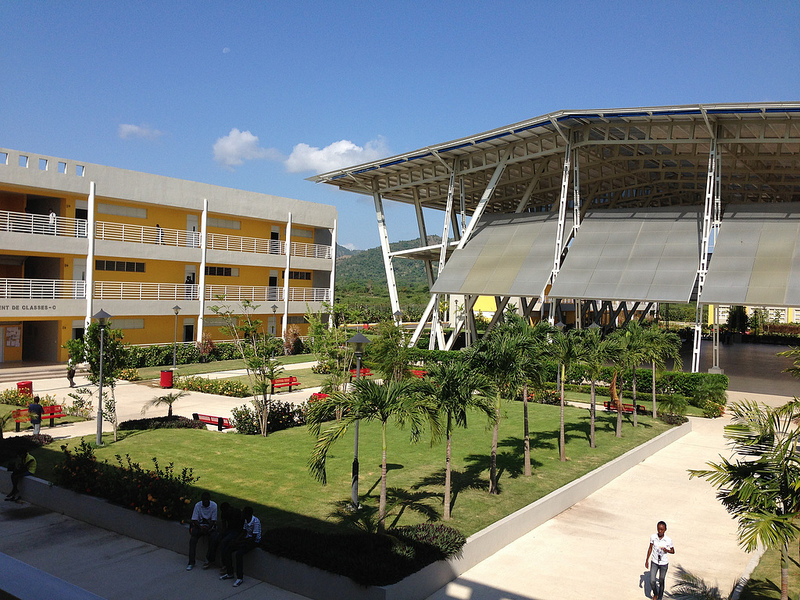
The Université d'État d'Haïti, Campus Henri Christophe de Limonade

Among its past rectors, the university includes the writer Jean Price Mars.

The university's buildings were largely destroyed during the earthquake of January 12, 2010. A consortium of historically black colleges in the United States was formed to help rebuild part of the campus.

After the earthquake, the government of the Dominican Republic paid for the construction of a new university campus near the town of Limonade in northern Haiti, called the Université d'État d'Haïti, Campus Henri Christophe de Limonade.

== Éditions de l'Université d'État d'Haïti ==
The Éditions de l'Université d'État d'Haïti (State University Press of Haiti) was launched in 2006 with Professor Hérard Jadotte at its helm as Director. Its mission is to promote research through the publication and dissemination of scientific texts, to diversify the documentary resources for the academic community and the general public and to improve university education. The Éditions de l'Université d'État d'Haïti publishes scientific and didactic works for teachers and researchers, the best end-of-studies dissertations supported at UEH, classics belonging to the Haitian intellectual heritage, research published abroad of interest to the academic community, scientific journals, and symposium proceedings. By June 2014 it had a catalogue of 70 academic and research publications, with another 20 titles slated to launch in the fall.

== Constituent Colleges and Schools ==
- École Normale Supérieure
- Faculté d'Agronomie et de Médecine Vétérinaire (School of Agronomy and Veterinary Medicine)
- Faculté des Sciences Humaines (Faculty of the Humanities)
- Faculté des Sciences (Faculty of Science)
- Faculté de Droit et des Sciences Economique (Faculty of Law and Economics)
- Faculté d'Ethnologie (Faculty of Ethnology)
- Faculté de Linguistique Appliquée (Faculty of Applied Linguistics)
- Faculté de Médecine et de Pharmacie (Faculty of Medicine and Pharmacy)
- Faculté d'Odontologie (Faculty of Dentistry)
- Institut d'Études et de Recherches Africaines (Institute of African Studies and Research)
- Institut National d'Administration, de Gestion et de Hautes Etudes Internationales (INAGHEI - National Institute of Administration, Management and International Studies)
- Centre de Techniques de Planification et d'Économie Appliquée (CTPEA)
- École de Droit et des Sciences Économiques des Gonaïves (Gonaives School of Law and Economics)
- École de Droit de Hinche (Hinche School of Law)
- Campus Henri Christophe de Limonade
- Faculté de Droit, des Sciences Économiques et de Gestion du Cap-Haïtien (Cap-Haitien Faculty of Law, Economics and Management)
- École de Droit et d'Économie de Port-de-Paix (Port-de-Paix School of Law and Economics)
- École de Droit et des Sciences Économiques de Fort-Liberté (Fort-Liberté of Law and Economics)
- École de Droit et des Sciences Économiques des Cayes (Cayes School of Law and Economics)
- École de Droit de Jacmel (Jacmel School of Law)

== Notable alumni ==
- François Duvalier – former president of Haiti
- Jacques-Édouard Alexis – former prime minister of Haiti
- Conceptia Ouinsou – lawyer, educator and politician in Benin
- Ginette Michaud Privert (1984) – physician and former First Lady of Haiti (2016–2017)
- Gérandale Télusma – former member of the Chamber of Deputies
- Samuel Dameus – media personality and filmmaker
- Tina Nadine Anilus – women's rights activist
