= Samuel Dameus =

Haitian media personality and filmmaker (born 1986)

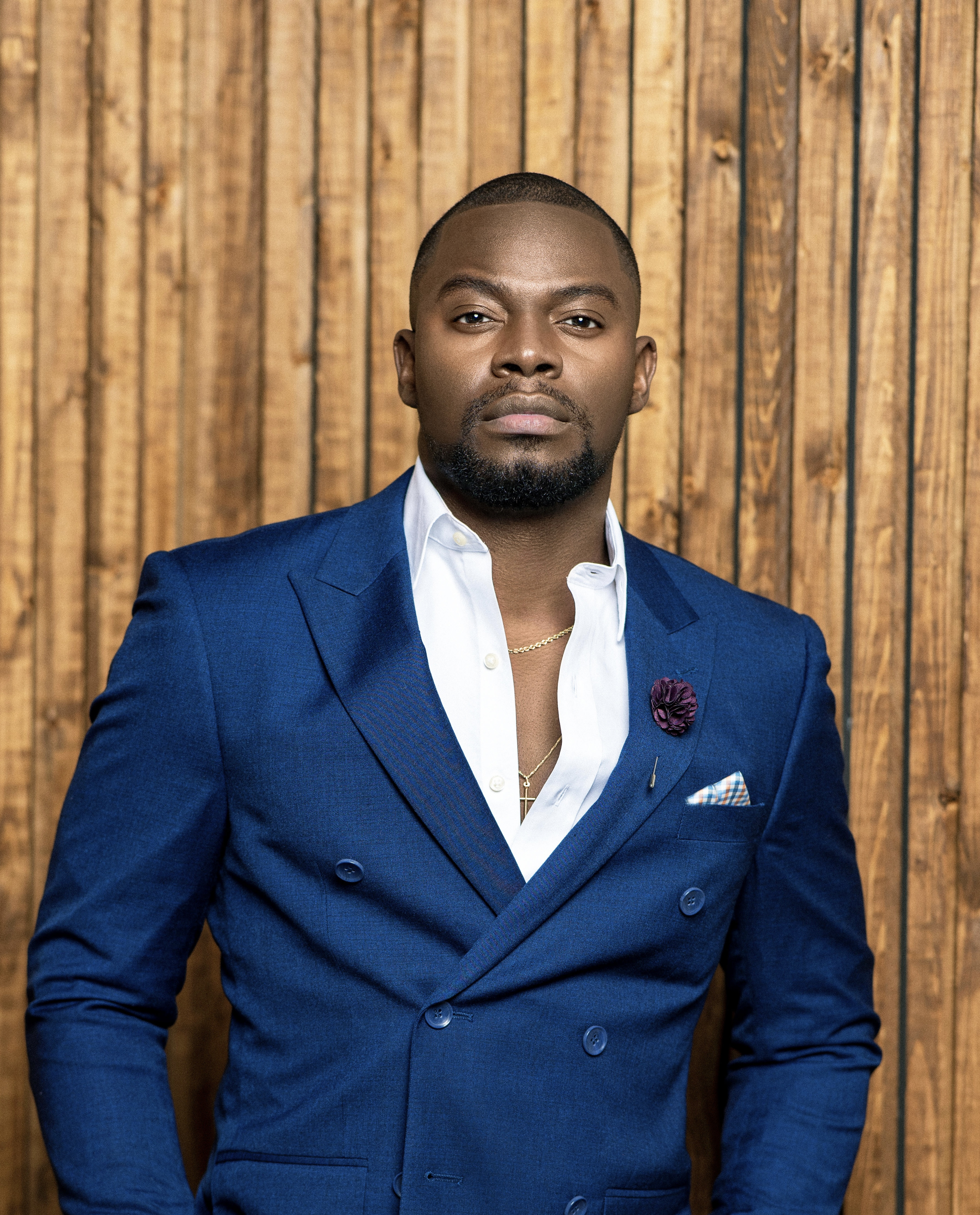
- Born: Samuel Daméus; January 10, 1986 (age 40); Cap-Haïtien, Haiti
- Education: State University of Haiti
- Occupations: Media personality, filmmaker
- Years active: 2001–present
- Employer: Faces of Haiti
- Title: Founder of Faces of Haiti
- Website: samueldameus.com

Samuel Dameus (born January 10, 1986) is a Haitian media personality and filmmaker. He is best known for founding the international photographic project "Faces of Haiti", which later became a digital media platform.

== Early life and education ==
Samuel Dameus was born on January 10, 1986, at Justinien Hospital in Cap-Haïtien, Haiti. His mother, Arlette Bélizaire, is a teacher. His father, Hérard Dameus, an architect and surveyor, died when he was young. He has a sister, Rachele Sandy Dameus Chanlatte.

He attended Collège Notre-Dame du Perpétuel Secours in Cap-Haïtien, an institution run by the Congregation of Holy Cross. From a young age, Samuel was a studious and socially engaged student. His leadership qualities were evident early on through his active involvement in school, church, and various youth organizations.

After high school, he earned a bachelor's degree in communication from the State University of Haiti, where he obtained a degree in social communication in 2005. He then pursued graduate studies in crisis communication, completing a specialized program with the UNWTO in Spain in 2015.

== Career ==
At just 15 years old, Samuel began his media career as a television presenter for RTK (Radio Télé Konbit) in Cap-Haïtien, where he hosted the programs "Discovering Talents" and "Meeting Young People."

After graduating, he landed his first major position in 2010 as a communications officer for the International Federation of Red Cross and Red Crescent Societies (IFRC). In 2014, he became head of communications at the Haitian Ministry of Tourism, where he helped revitalize the country's international image through creative campaigns and strategic messaging. He then became marketing manager at Sunrise Airways in 2016, and later at Curls Dynasty in 2019.

That same year, Samuel ventured into entrepreneurship by launching the first high-end barbershop in Cap-Haïtien: Select Barbershop.

=== Faces of Haiti ===
On January 27, 2017, Samuel launched "Faces of Haiti" with an initial photo exhibition at the Makaya Gallery in Miami, Florida. The project quickly gained momentum, evolving into a world tour and then, during the COVID-19 pandemic, into a digital platform. Today, "Faces of Haiti" is one of Haiti's most prominent media platforms, known for celebrating the richness, resilience, and beauty of Haitian identity through powerful storytelling. The platform reaches millions of people on social media and digital platforms.

=== Film and Cinema ===
As a filmmaker, Samuel Dameus has written, directed, and produced two critically acclaimed documentaries.

- BOYO: Haiti in 30 Days (2021) premiered at the AMC Aventura in Miami on October 1st.
- Heroes of the Massacre River (2025) premiered on May 30th at the Little Haiti Cultural Complex. This film highlights the story of the Haitian workers behind the historic Ouanaminthe Canal, a symbol of unity and resistance.

Samuel Dameus has also acted in several Haitian films: - "Je m'en souviens" (I Remember), directed by Robenson Lauvince - "Jézabel," directed by Robenson Lauvince

Samuel is the casting director for "July 7."

=== Business and Advocacy ===
In addition to his work in media and film, Samuel is an entrepreneur and invests in short-term rental properties.

He also serves on the board of directors of the Ayiti Community Trust (ACT), where he actively supports local organizations working for lasting change in Haiti.

== Personal life ==
Samuel is divorced and has a son, Aëon Dameus.
