= Université d'État d'Haïti, Campus Henri Christophe de Limonade =

Public university in Limonade, Haiti

Coordinates: 19°39′22.06″N 72°4′5.81″W

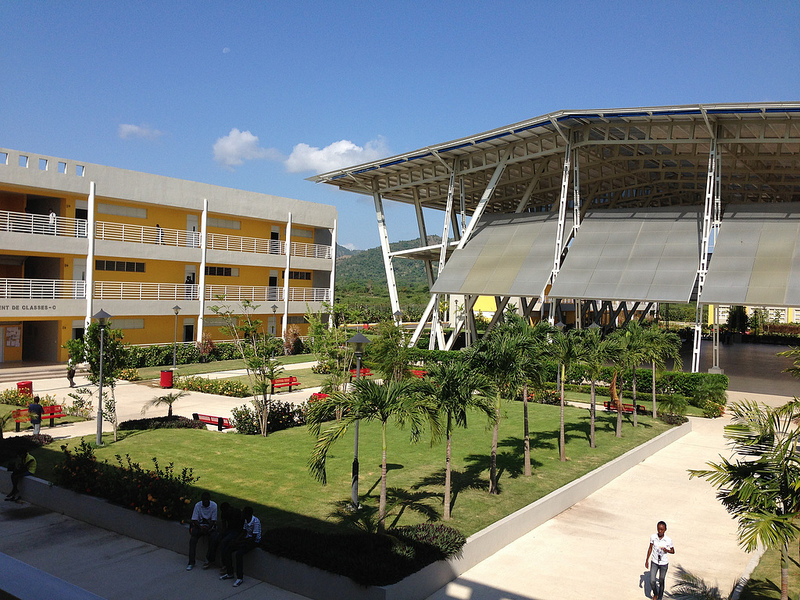
The Université d'État d'Haïti, Campus Roi Henri Christophe in Limonade

Université d'État d'Haïti, Campus Roi Henri Christophe is a university campus located in Limonade, northern Haiti. The campus is part of the University of Haiti and was completed in January 12, 2012 (14 years ago). Donated by the Government of the Dominican Republic, during the presidency of Leonel Fernandez Reyna, the campus was built at a cost of US$ 50 million.

The campus can hold up to 10,000 students, but fewer currently attend.
