= Arly Larivière =

Haitian musician and songwriter

Arly Larivière (born on August 22, 1972 in Cap-Haïtien, Nord, Haiti) is a Haitian singer, songwriter and keyboardist. He is best known as the lead singer and songwriter for the Kompa band Nu-Look.

== Early life ==
Larivière was born in Cap-Haïtien, Nord, Haiti on August 22, 1972. He was the second oldest of five children. At a young age, he formed the band Kazak Eksperyans D'Haiti in his hometown. He eventually left Kazak to form the band Feeling with Shedly Abraham, Elliot “Prince Elo” Alouidor and Nickson “Niki Bass” Mesidor. In 1992, he joined archrival Lakol Mizik Majik forming a superband. That same year, they released a well acclaimed carnival song before heading to the United States for Lakol's first international tour. All but two of the band's members (Herard Atticus and Alphonse “Ti Fredo” Patrick Duret elected to overstay their visas and pursue their musical careers in the USA. Lariviere, also known as Ti Arly and whose father and primary influence is a Haitian composer for Tropicana, decided to settle in Florida where he eventually founded the musical formation D’Zine which was later rebranded Nu-Look.

== Career ==
Larivière migrated to the U.S. and resided in Florida. During the 1990s, he was part of a band called the D-zine. He later left D-zine, and in 2000 partnered with Gazzman "Couleur" Pierre to form the Kompa band Nu-Look, which performed for 14 years with Larivière as their Maestro and composer. Some of the songs composed by Larivière are "Loving you", "Why do you say you love me", "Notre histoire", and "A qui la faute".

On January 5, 2010, Gazzman left Nu-Look to form his own band dISIp. After Gazzman's departure, Edersse "Pipo" Stanis became the lead singer, problems within Nu-Look eventually led to his departure to join another band called Klass. Arly tried to recruit a new lead singer for the band, but eventually became the sole singer of the band. In November 2013 Nu-Look released a new album titled I Got This; all of the songs on this album were written by Lariviere.

In 2013, Larivière and Nu-Look performed at the Haiti Carnival. He has continued to lead the band since 2016.

Arly Larivière and his band Nu Look performed at the Olympia in Paris on February 13, 2022. The event featured Larivière's vocals and stage presence. The setlist featured a mix of his hit singles and newer material. The crowd praised Larivière's delivery. This performance was noted by fans and critics. The Olympia provided the backdrop for Larivière's concert.

== Albums ==
- Big Mistake 2002
- Still News 2005
- Abo 2008
- Encyclopédie 2009
- Confirmation 2011
- I Got This 2013
- My Time 2016
- No Stress 2019
- Just For You 2024
