= Étienne Chavannes =

Haitian painter

Étienne Chavannes (born 1939 in Cap Haïtien) is a Haitian painter. Chavannes typically paints crowd scenes, such as religious celebrations, funerals, and sports events. In 1978, his works were exhibited at the Brooklyn Museum in New York City.
