= Puerto Real (Hispaniola) =

Former Spanish settlement in Haiti

Puerto Real was a settlement that existed on the northern coast of the island of Hispaniola, near the present-day town of Limonade in Haiti.

Puerto Real in Haiti marks one of the first Spanish colonization attempts in the New World, founded in 1503 on Hispaniola's northern coast to exploit resources as dictated by the Spanish Crown However, it soon established its own social, economic, and demographic dynamics. Anticipating mineral wealth, local Indigenous peoples were indentured, but their numbers quickly dwindled, leading to the importation of Lucayans and later African slaves. Although nearby copper deposits were superficial, cattle farming thrived, turning cowhides into a sought-after commodity, especially among illicit traders, while Puerto Real's distance from Santo Domingo fostered an independent growth.

The settlement was founded in 1503 as an outpost of the Spanish Empire but was abandoned in 1579 in an attempt to suppress smuggling.

After the rediscovery of its remains by a local medecin, the site saw archaeological excavations in the 1970s and 80s.

== Bibliography ==
- K. A. Deagan (Hrsg.), Puerto Real: The Archaeology of a Sixteenth-Century Spanish Town in Hispaniola (Gainesville 1995).ref>[Review: Puerto Real: The Archaeology of a Sixteenth-Century Spanish Town in Hispaniola, dukeupress.edu
- B. G. McEwan, Domestic Adaptation at Puerto Real, Haiti. Hist. Arch. 20,1, 1986, 44–49.
