= Limonade =

Limonade Limonad
- Commune
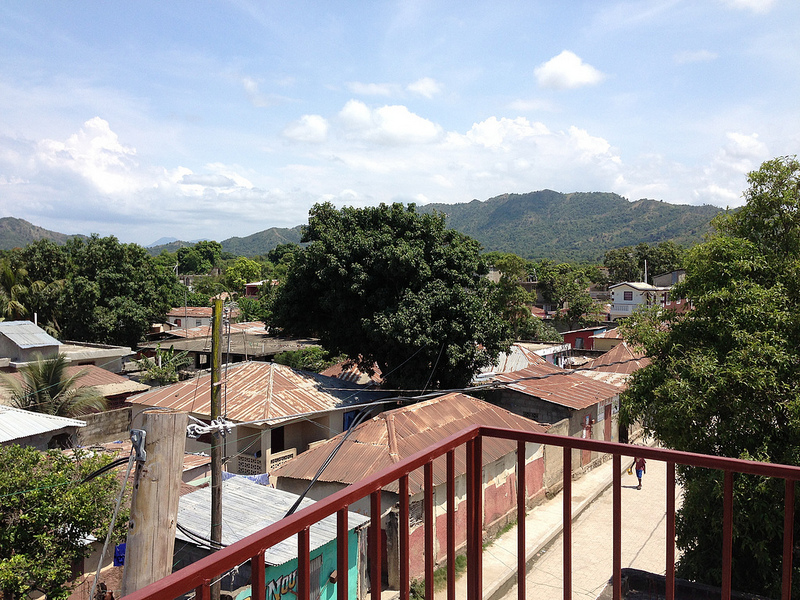
- Limonade

- Location in Haiti
- Coordinates: 19°40′0″N 72°7′0″W
- Country: Haiti
- Department: Nord
- Arrondissement: Cap-Haïtien
- Elevation: 66 m (217 ft)

Population (7 August 2003)
  - Total: 69,256
- Time zone: UTC-05:00 (EST)
  - Summer (DST): UTC-04:00 (EDT)

Limonade (French pronunciation: [limɔnad]; Haitian Creole: Limonad) is a commune in the Cap-Haïtien Arrondissement, in the Nord department of Haiti. It has 69,256 inhabitants. Christopher Columbus and his crew celebrated the first Christmas in the Americas at Limonade in 1492. Limonade is also the city in which François Capois, a renowned hero of the Haitian Revolution, died.

In 2012, a new university built by the Dominican Republic was finished near the town, Université Roi Henri Christophe, part of the University of Haiti.
