= Ogier-Fombrun Museum =

Museum in Haiti

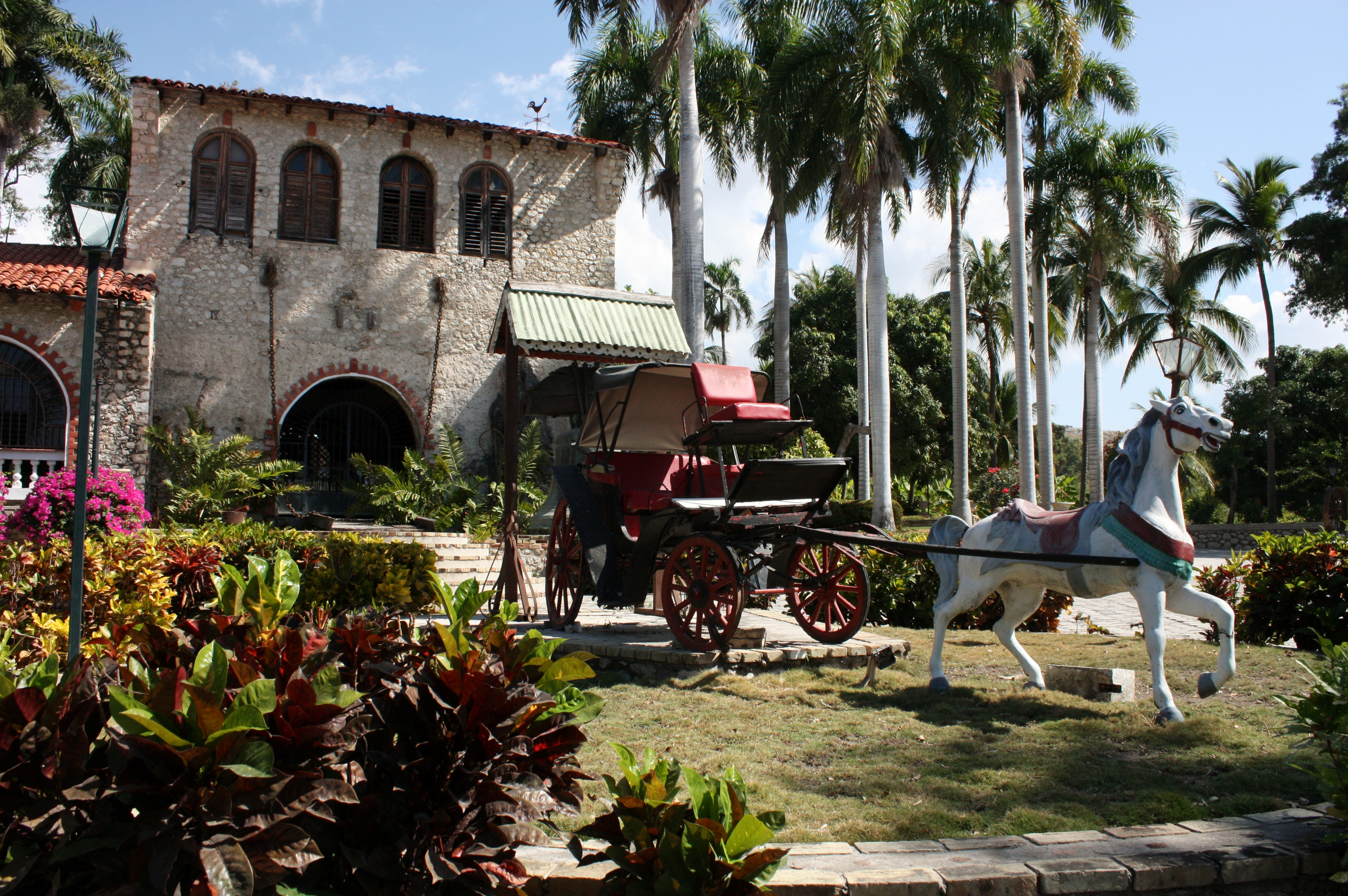
- Located on restored Habitation Ogier sugar plantation
- Interactive map of Ogier-Fombrun Museum
- Location: Route Nationale nº1 Km77, in Moulin-sur-Mer Resort; La Côte des Arcadins; Montrouis, Haiti
- Type: Artifacts museum
- Opening date: 1993; 33 years ago
- Website: https://museeogierfombrun.org/; https://moulinsurmer.com/museeogierfombrun/

The Ogier-Fombrun Museum is a historical and relics museum located on a Restored sugar plantation in Moulin-sur-Mer Resort in Montrouis, Haiti. The museum not only houses artifacts, but has installations, and local heritage sites of the Taino, Haitian history, and Spanish/French colonial history.

== History ==
The Ogier-Fombrun Museum is located in Habitation Ogier sugar plantation built in 1760 by the Bordeaux colonist Guillaume Ogier, and abandoned upon his death in 1799, during the Haitian Revolution.

Architect Gérard Fombrun acquired this building in March 1977 and restored it over a period of 35 years. He installed a museum complex there that exhibits the history of Haiti from the pre-Columbian era of the Taínos , followed by the Spanish and French colonial periods, until the Haitian independence of the Republic of Haiti in 1804.

Opened to the public in 1993, the Ogier-Fombrun Museum displays vestiges of the sugar industry and the slave trade. The museum showcases artifacts from different periods of Haitian history, including indigenous cultures, colonial times, and the Haitian Revolution. It features unique heritage elements including: a 150 m long aqueduct which continues to carry water to a gigantic 20-foot wooden waterwheel which once powered the cane mill, the drying oven for the "sugar loaves", the calemanan mill, an old animal-powered mill from a colonial plantation in Saintard

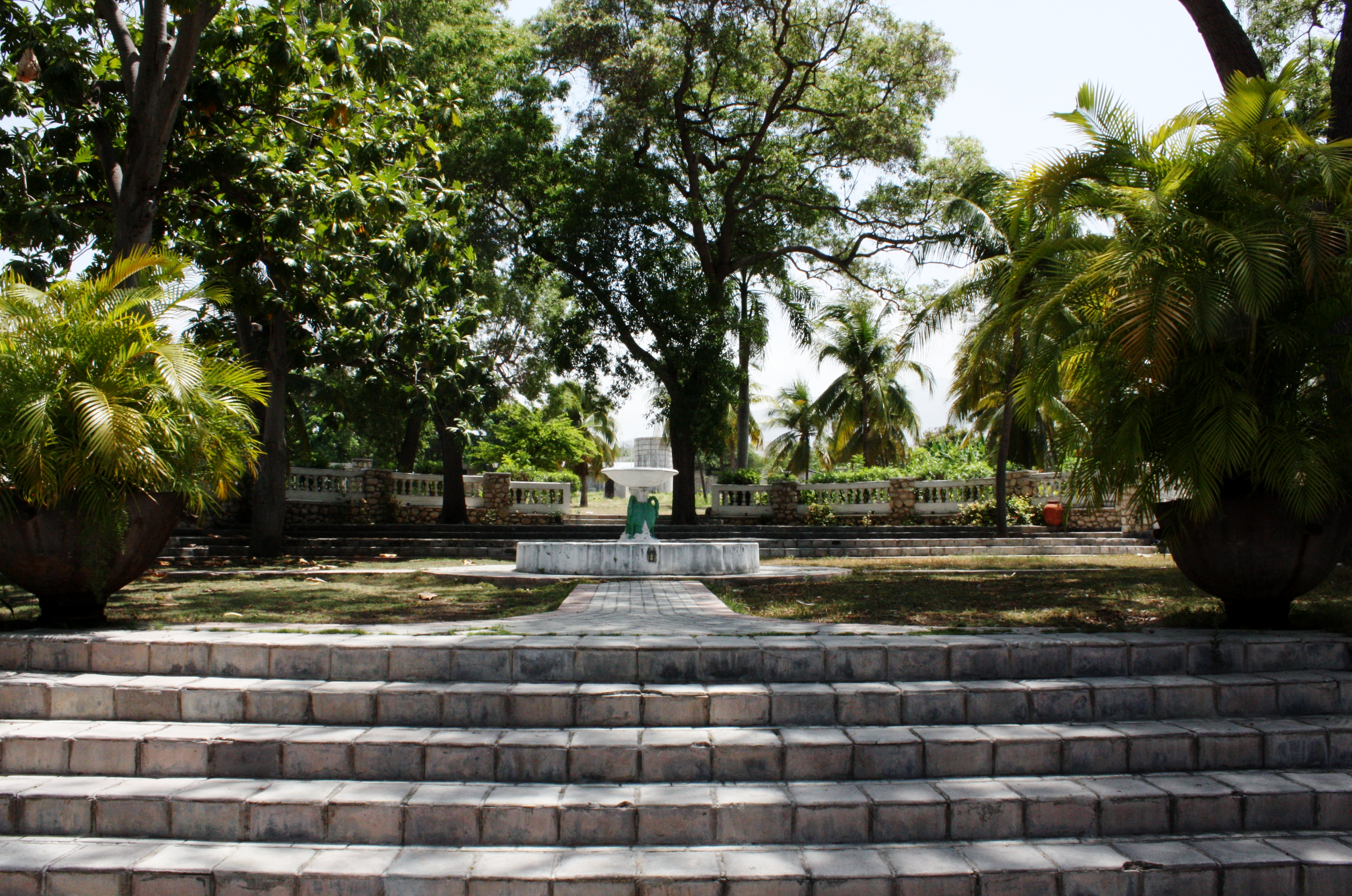
One of the museum courtyards where plays and other outdoor cultural events take place

== Permanent Exhibition ==
- Taíno-Arawak Artifacts
- colonial-era Artifacts
- Haitian history Artifacts
- Haitian art and cultural displays

=== Activities ===
- Cultural events
  - The museum hosts various events, such as light shows, dance performances, and exhibitions
  - Dance exhibits
  - Historical reenactments
- Educational programs:
  - The museum is committed to education through its programming, which includes lectures, workshops, and other programs

=== Sugar Plantation Colonial Architecture ===
*A sugar cane mill dating from the 18th century
*A 150m long aqueduct that continues to flow water to a gigantic 20-foot wooden bucket wheel that once powered the sugar cane mill;
*The drying room for the sugar loaves;
*A steam room

- The "calemanan" mill, an old animal-drawn mill from a colonial dwelling in Saintard

=== Garden Museum ===
- Cafe at the garden
- Light shows

== See also ==
- List of museums in Haiti
- Culture of Haiti
- Musée du Panthéon National Haïtien
- National Museum of Art, Haiti
- National Museum of Haiti
