= List of museums in Haiti =

This is a list of museums in Haiti.

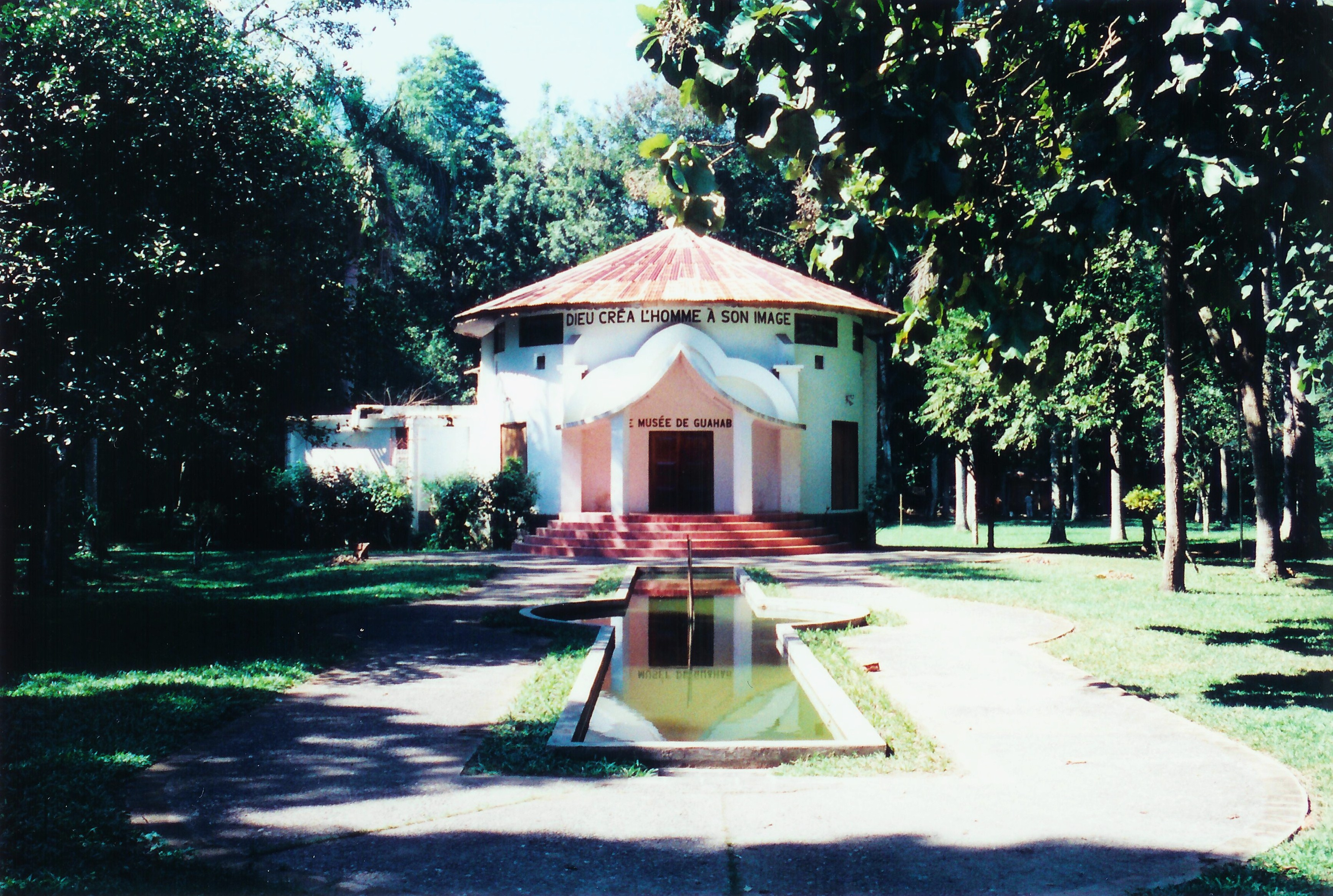
Guahaba Museum in Limbé

== Museum List ==
Museum	Location	Status	
Museum	National Museum of Haiti	Port-au-Prince	Unscathed and Open
Centre d'Art	Port-au-Prince	Collapsed in 2010 Earthquake. In July 2025, police rescued thousands of artworks from the Port-au-Prince museum after gangs vandalized the building and created security risks.	
Sans-Souci Palace	Milot, Haiti	Unscathed and Open	
the Citadelle Laferrière	Milot, Haiti	Unscathed and Open	
Musée du Bureau d'Ethnologie	Port-au-Prince		
Parc historique de la Canne à Sucre	Port-au-Prince		
Musée Ogie-Fombrun	Montrouis		
Musée Vaudou (Collection Marianne)	Port-au-Prince		
Expressions Art Gallery	Port-au-Prince		
Musee de Guahaba	Limbé		
Museé d'Art Nader	Pétion-Ville, Haiti	Collapsed in 2010	
Musée du Peuple de Fermathe	Kenscoff		
Musee du Pantheon National	Port-au-Prince	Unscathed and Open	
Musée Georges Liautaud	Croix-des-Bouquets		
Chute de Saut-d'Eau	Saut-d'Eau		
Cap-Haïtien Fine Arts Museum	Cap-Haïtien		
Holy Trinity Cathedral, Port-au-Prince	Port-au-Prince	Destroyed in 2010, rebuilding	
Saint Martial Library	Port-au-Prince	Destroyed in 2010	
Galerie Monnin	Pétion-ville	Now open in Miami, FL also	
Musée d'Art Haïtien du Collège Saint-Pierre	Port-au-Prince	Damaged in 2010	
Hotel Oloffson	Port-au-Prince, Nearby the Centre d'Art in the capital, attack.	This historic hotel was destroyed by a gang arson attack.	
