= Fombrun =

Fombrun is a surname. Notable people with the surname include:

- Gérard Fombrun (1927–2015), Haitian architect, construction engineer, and sculptor
- Odette Roy Fombrun (1917–2022), Haitian writer and intellectual
