= Guahaba Museum =

Archaeology museum in Limbé, Haiti

- Musée de Guahaba
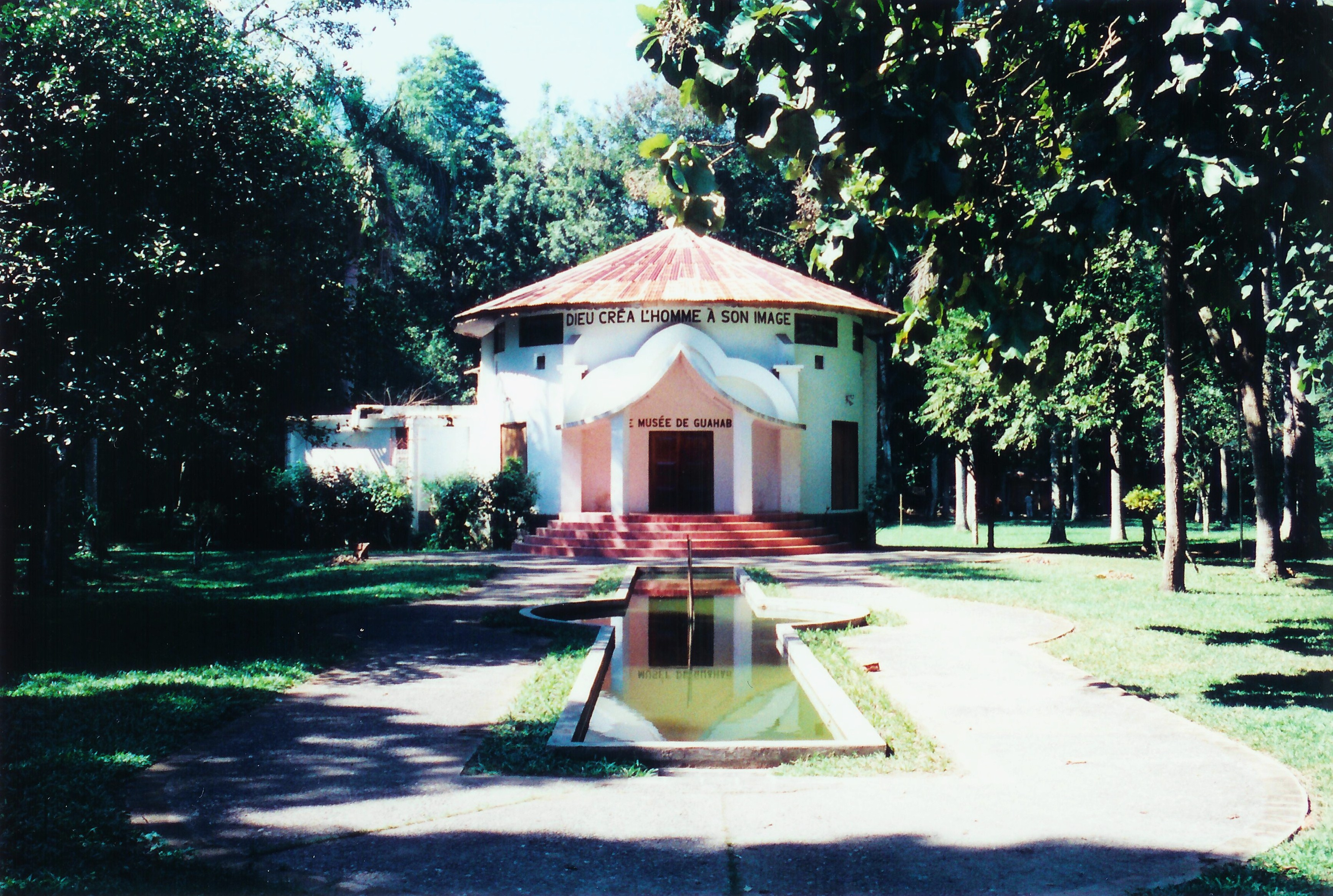
- The Guahaba Museum in 1997
- Location: Limbé, Haiti
- Coordinates: 19°41′56″N 72°24′21″W
- Type: Archaeology museum
- Collections: Taíno artifacts
- Founder: William H. Hodges
- Owner: Hodges family

The Guahaba Museum (French: Musée de Guahaba) is an archaeology museum in Limbé, Haiti. It was established in 1983 by William H. Hodges, a medical missionary and avocational archaeologist. The museum houses a large collection of Taíno artifacts recovered from an archaeological site in the nearby village of En Bas Saline. The site was excavated with the assistance of Haiti's National Bureau of Ethnology and the Florida Museum of Natural History.

== History ==
The Guahaba Museum was founded in 1983 by William H. Hodges. It is located across from the Good Samaritan Hospital (Hôpital Le Bon Samaritain) in Limbé. Hodges was a medical missionary who worked at the Good Samaritan Hospital, but his avocation was in archaeology. He had amassed a collection of Taíno pottery from his patients, who eventually showed him the site where they had found the relics. The site was located in a remote area of the village of En Bas Saline, and was largely unknown at the time because of the difficulty in getting there.

From 1983 to 1988, staff from the Guahaba Museum, Haiti's National Bureau of Ethnology, and the Florida Museum of Natural History jointly surveyed, mapped, and excavated the site. Many of the items recovered from there were moved to the Guahaba Museum.

In the early 2000s, the museum was administered by staff from the Good Samaritan Hospital and had 24-hour electricity, security guards, and interactive exhibits. The building is now unfenced and its land frequented by locals taking a shortcut through the property. The museum nonetheless still houses one of the largest collections of pre-Columbian, Taíno artifacts in Haiti. It is presently owned and operated privately by the Hodges family.

On 2 October 2015, a team led by then Minister of Culture Dithny Joan Raton, then Director General of the National Bureau of Ethnology Erol Josué, and former Minister of Culture Eddy Lubin visited the museum to survey it as a potential site for an interpretation center about Puerto Real, one of the first Spanish colonization attempts in the New World. The center was to be established in collaboration with the Spanish Ministry of Culture, but the Haitian and Spanish governments ultimately decided on a different collobarative project.

== See also ==
- List of museums in Haiti
