= Gérard Fombrun =

Haitian architect

- Born: January 21, 1927; Port-au-Prince
- Died: February 1, 2015 (aged 88)
- Education: State University of Haiti
- Known for: Ogier-Fombrun Museum, Bronze Bulls
- Style: Gingerbread, Bronze
- Elected: Board member of the Museum of Haitian National Pantheon; National Institute of Culture and Arts, Director in 1983

Gérard Fombrun was a Haitian architect, construction engineer, writer and sculptor. Fombrun studied sculpture and architecture in Haiti, France, and Puerto Rico.

== Works ==
His sculptures, typically made with bronze, have been exhibited throughout Latin America and the Caribbean.

As an engineer, he was known for the Toussaint Louverture International Airport, the Resort Moulin sur Mer, several buildings in the Wharf of Port-au-Prince, and the Imperial Cinema.

In 1977, he purchased an old colonial-era sugar mill. It became his most emblematic achievement throughout his architectural career, now the Musee Ogier-Fombrun.

=== Bibliography ===
Fombrun produced two literary works:

1. "Et Haïti vint au Monde,": A promenade on the passage through the Colonial Museum Ogier-Fombrun (1492 - 1804) 1997 118 pages
2. “Pour que renaissent le prestige et l’espoir." 2003, 379 pages
3. Idée nouvelle pour sauver Haïti 1997, 28 pages

==== Additional bibliography ====
- Schutt-Ainé, Patricia; Team of the Librairie Au Service de la Culture (1994).
- Librairie Au Service de la Culture, ed. Haiti: A Basic Reference Book . Miami, Florida. p. 109 . ISBN 0-9638599-0-0 .
- Marie-José Nadal-Gardère , Gérald Bloncourt, La Peinture haïtienne , Nathan (ed.), 1986 207 pages
