= Expressions Art Gallery =

Art museum in Haiti

Coordinates: 18.5067°N 72.2841°W

Expressions Galerie D'Art is an art gallery in Port-au-Prince, Haiti.
