= National Museum of Art, Haiti =

National Museum of Art
- Location: Port-au-Prince, Haiti
- Coordinates: 18°32′20″N 72°20′9″W
- Type: Art museum

The National Museum of Art is an art museum in central Port-au-Prince, Haiti. The museum contains pre-Columbian works of art from all over the country.

== See also ==
- Musée du Panthéon National Haïtien
- National Museum of Haiti
