= Limbé (commune) =

Limbé Lenbe
- Commune
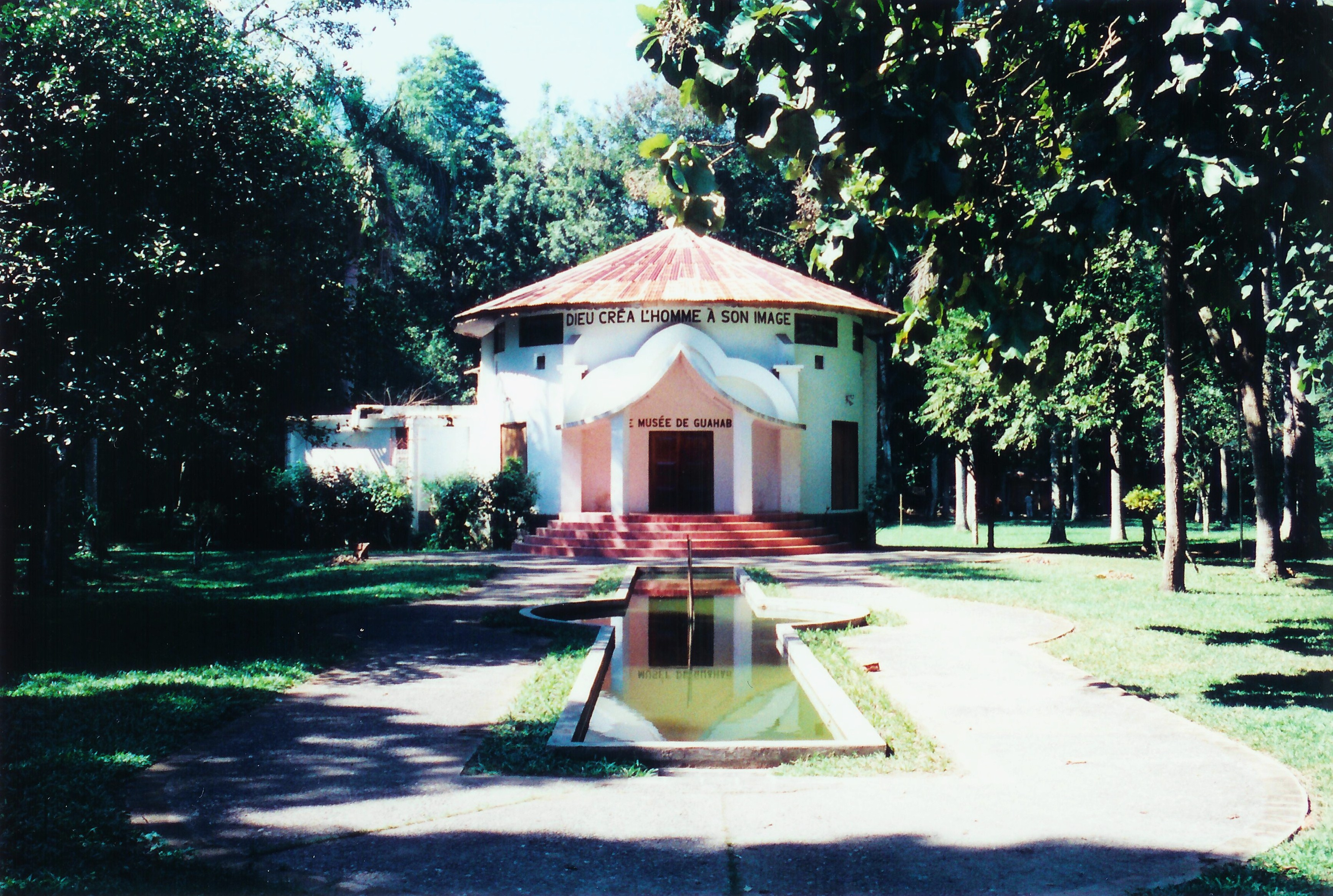

- Location in Haiti
- Coordinates: 19°42′20″N 72°24′53″W
- Country: Haiti
- Department: Nord
- Arrondissement: Limbé
- Elevation: 66 m (217 ft)

Population (7 August 2003)
  - Total: 69,256
- Time zone: UTC-05:00 (EST)
  - Summer (DST): UTC-04:00 (EDT)

Limbé (French pronunciation: [lɛ̃be]; Haitian Creole: Lenbe) is a commune in the Limbé Arrondissement, in the Nord department of Haiti.

With a population of 32200 inhabitants (2003 census) it is the second city in importance in this department after Cap-Haïtien. The arrondissement du Limbé (borough of Limbé) includes two communes: Limbé and Bas-Limbé (Lower Limbé). The commune du Limbé includes seven rural sections: Tanmas (1st), Haut-Limbé, Soufrière, Ravine-des-Roches, 4th or Simalo, Camp-Coq and 8th section (near the town of Plaisance). The arrondissement du Limbé has about between 69,256 and 80,000 inhabitants (United Nations OCHA (Haiti) report on the population of Haiti of 2003 published in October 2004). Limbé is located 220 km north of the capital Port-au-Prince.

== Overview ==
The nearest neighbouring towns or cities are Bas-Limbé (9 km north), Port-Margot (8 km northwest), Plaisance (35 km south), Cap-Haïtien (26 km northeast) and Acul-du-Nord (12 km east).

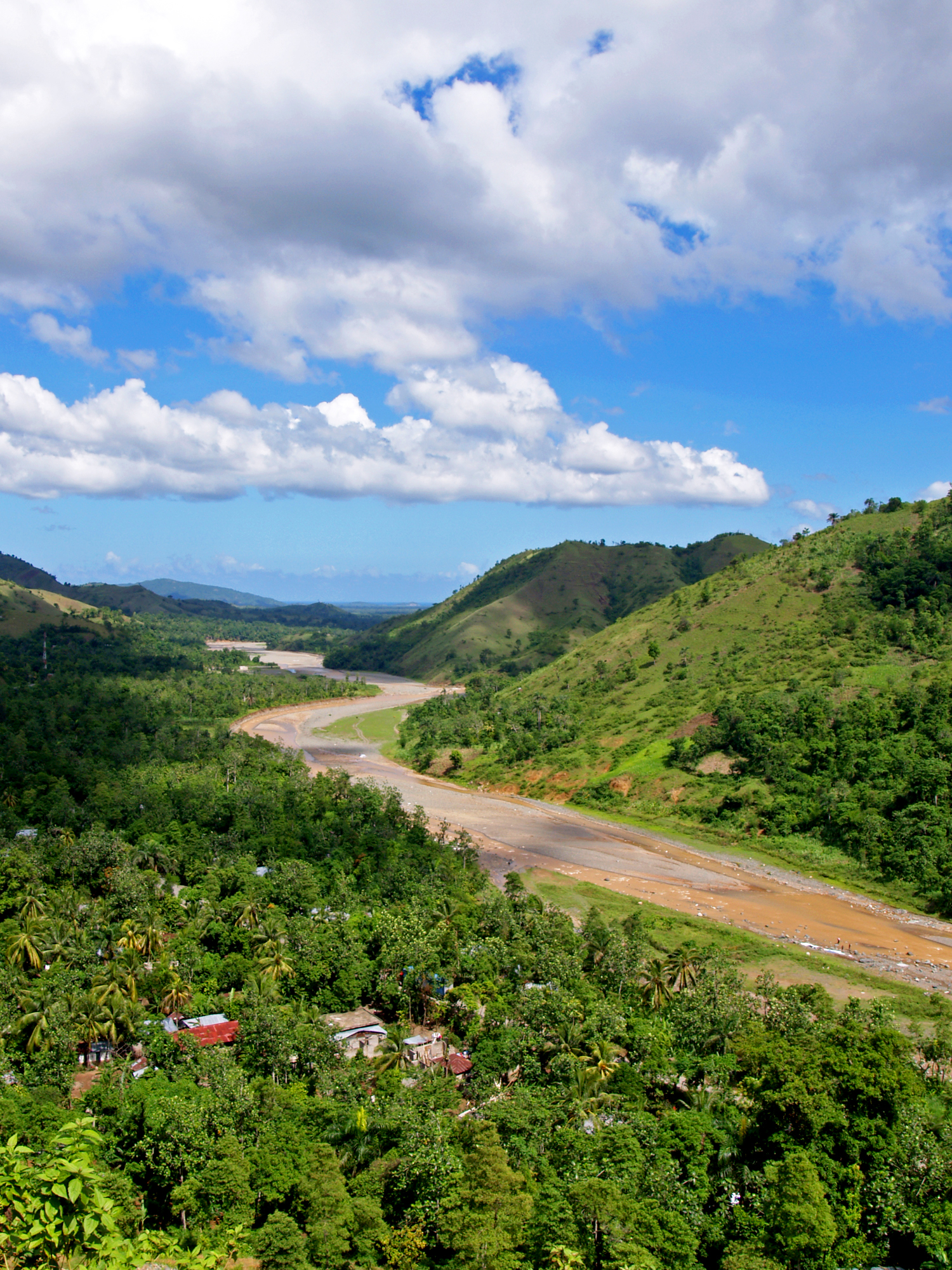
Limbé river

The Limbé River (rivière du Limbé) that flows toward the city on its way North to the sea gave its strength to the city with a diverse agricultural base. Production includes banana, mango, coffee, other fruits in the higher surrounding areas of the city and rice production in Bas-Limbé near the sea. However the city is also prone to flooding. Particularly on November 18, 1963 a major flash flood resulting from a very active hurricane season (the most damaging one being Hurricane Flora) caused the river of Limbé to flood the city. At the time the death toll in Limbé and surrounding areas was estimated to have reached between 100 and 500 people. Although no official record existed about the damage caused by the flood in Limbé, accounts from numerous eyewitnesses and the force of the hurricane (National Hurricane Center, hurricane 1963 archive season1) support the theory of a large scale tragedy with a great number of houses damaged or many even carried away by the raging water. Presently the flow of the river of Limbé is greatly diminished due to advanced and general deforestation in Haiti. Note that Limbé and surrounding areas still have many trees in comparison to the remainder of Haiti.

Limbé is home to two good hospital facilities. Dispensaire St-Jean opened by Catholic nuns (sisters of Ste-Carmelle) in the 60s but currently under government control and one hospital "Hôpital Bon-Samaritain" (The Good Samaritan) run by US Baptist missionaries. Limbé is therefore known in the Northern department for accessible health care services and many people flocked to the hospital Bon-Samaritain led for four decades by Dr. Williams Hodges before his death in 1996.

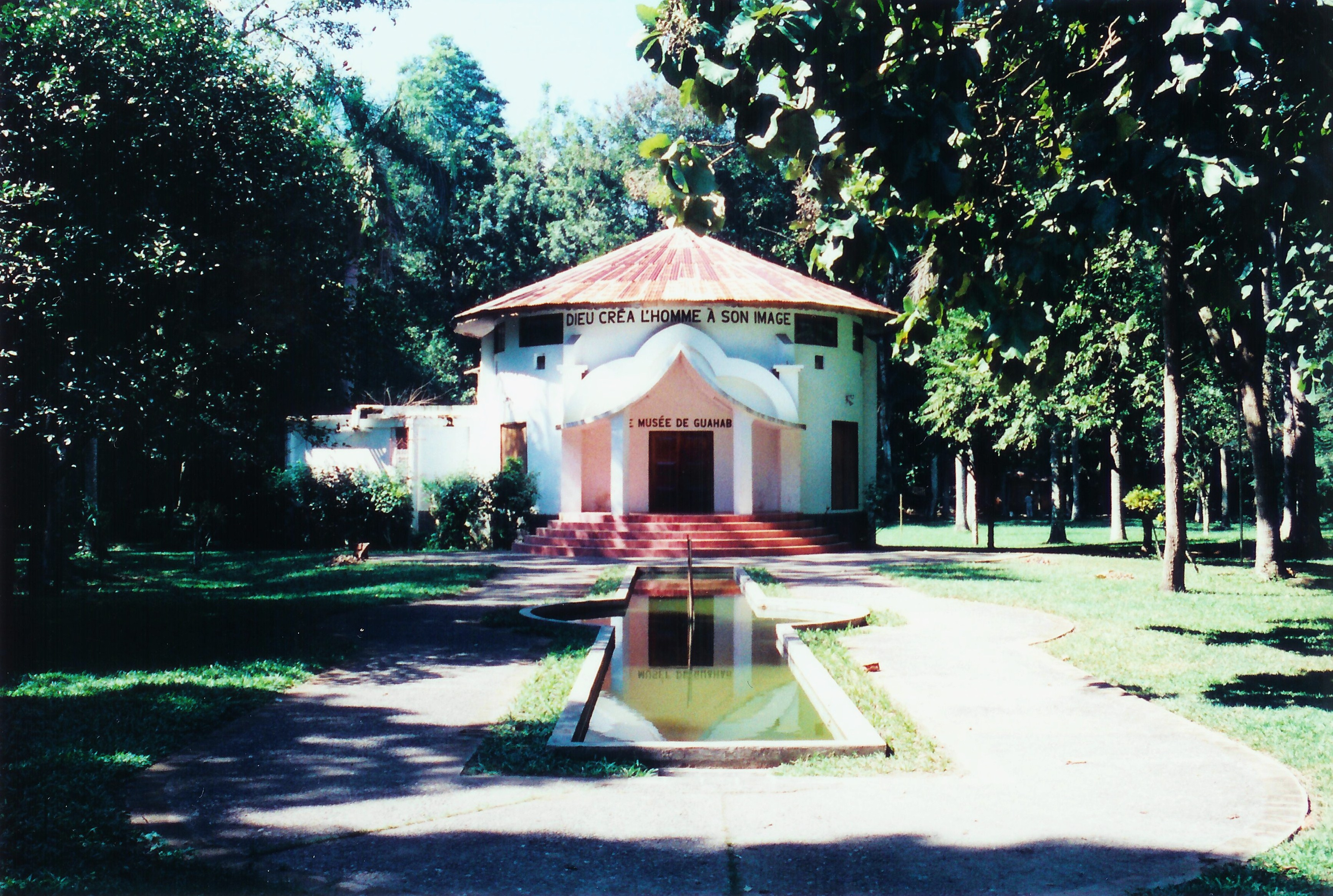
Guahaba Museum

He was also archeologist in his spare time and founded the small Guahaba Museum in Limbé dedicated to Amerimdian native artifacts from the Arawak/Taíno tribes. These tribes populated the area before the arrival of African slaves. Around 1973 Dr. Hodges also built an electrical dam to power the city and he provided running water through public fountains and to private homes later on in 1976. The dam is no longer in activity.

== History ==
In regard to Haitian history a vodou priest named Dutty Boukman lived in Limbé. Boukman organized a famous religious meeting of African slaves in Bois-Caiman in August 1791 to mentally prepare the slaves for the kickoff of the uprising. After that meeting the slaves set on fire the plantation of Frenchman Sebastien- François le Normand de Mezy in Chabaud 4th section of the commune of Limbé (Chabott in creole). A few years later in 1803 the slaves' army also gathered in Limbé in a square called Nan Canno (meaning "in cannons" because of this historic fact) to get ready before the final assault on Cap-Haïtien (26 km further to the northeast) and the famous battle of Vertières where the last French bastion was overpowered by the revolutionary slaves army during the Haitian revolution.

During the battle of Vertières, Haitian general Capois-La-Mort (Cap-Haitianer-The-Death), on horseback, and his men met a hail of fire as they advanced. Despite a bullet passing through his cap, Capois kept riding his horse urging his men to move forward. A cannon bullet struck down his horse to the ground. The general stood up and kept running toward the enemy line shouting to his soldiers "En avant! En avant!" (Forward! Forward!). Another bullet from a French sniper blew away Capois’ cap. Once more that did not stop him from holding up his saber and leading his men onward with his continuing cry of Forward! Observing this act of bravery, French General Comte de Rochambeau in charge of defending Cap-Haïtien, ordered to stop the firing and had his guards applauded this African warrior with drums rolls before the battle resumed.

In the aftermath of the 7.0 magnitude 12 January 2010 earthquake, on 22 February 2010, a mob of citizens erected barricades on the exit route of a World Food Program convoy, and attacked the convoy and its peacekeepers with rocks, to try to gain the goods carried within. The situation was resolved with no injuries and no arrests, after the National Police had been dispatched. The peacekeepers had agreed to distribute milk.

== Education ==
The Université Chrétienne du Nord d'Haïti is an autonomous institution of higher education private non-profit. It provides three functions: teaching, research and service.
