= National Museum of Haiti =

- Musée National d'Haïti
- Established: 1938
- Location: Port-au-Prince, Haiti
- Coordinates: 18.5264°N 72.3218°W

The National Museum of Haiti (Musée National d'Haïti) in Port-au-Prince, Haiti, was completed in 1938. It is located at Route Nationale No. 1 in the neighborhood of Montrouis. It is not to be confused with the Musée du Panthéon National Haitien (MUPANAH) (built in 1983), which is located across the street from the National Palace.

The National Museum houses information and artifacts covering the history of Haiti from the time of the Arawak and Taino Indians until the 1940s. There are murals showing the treatment of the Indians by the Spaniards and the treatment of African slaves by the French. There are also artifacts relating to the emperors of Haiti, including the pistol with which King Henri Christophe committed suicide.

== See also ==
- National Museum of Art, also in Port-au-Prince.
- Musée du Panthéon National Haïtien
