= Musée du Panthéon National Haïtien =

Historical museum and pantheon in Haiti

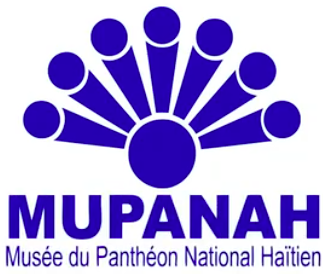

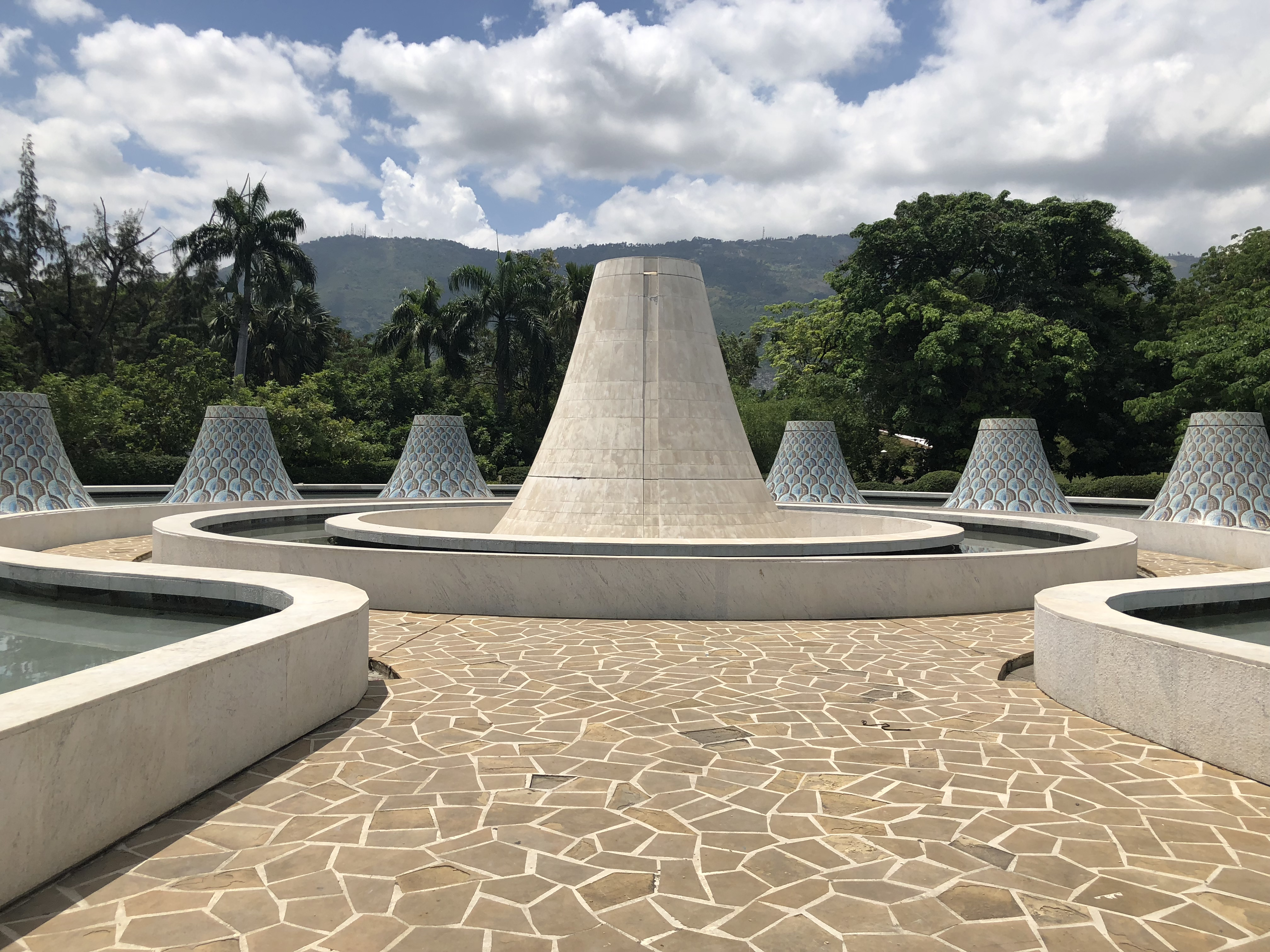
- The rooftop terrace of the museum, 2018
- Established: Groundbreaking: 1974; Grand Opening: April 7, 1983
- Location: GMV7+455, Av. de la République, Port-au-Prince, Haiti
- Coordinates: 18.542975505438474°N 72.33697797437377°W

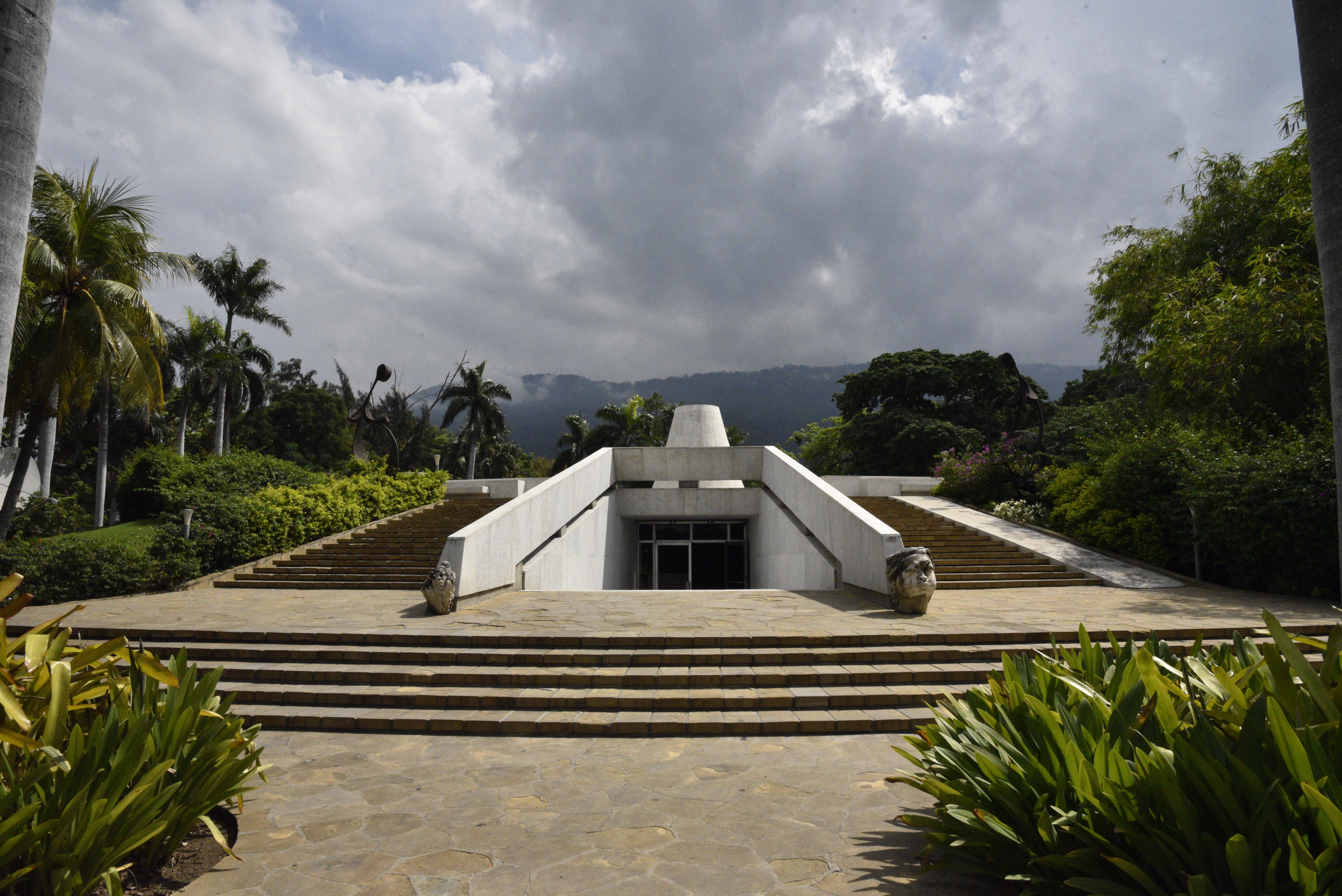
MUPANAH is mostly built underground, and the entrance features a wide, flowing arc of cement.

The National Pantheon Museum of Haiti (MUPANAH) is a museum featuring the heroes of the independence of Haiti, Haitian history, and culture. The museum is mostly underground, and the entrance a wide opening made of cement. The roof of the museum has several publicly accessible reflecting pools and gardens, designed for visitors to reflect upon the trials of slavery and the legacy of the Haitian Revolution. The museum features exhibits on the Taíno culture and slavery, revolution, the sugar and tobacco trades, and more. One of its main missions is to participate in heritage conservation, while teaching tourists about the Haitian culture. MUPANAH is an institution whose function is the conservation, protection and enhancement of historical and cultural heritage.

== Collections and exhibits ==
The museum traces Taíno culture, the history of the Spanish empire in Haiti, and a section dedicated to the heroes of Haitian independence, including the silver gun with which Henri Christophe committed suicide, and the bell used to announce Haitian independence. It also contains slavery chains, torture instruments, sculptures, and temporary exhibitions of paintings.

Underneath the floor of the main hall lie the interred remains of the Founding Fathers of Haiti. Above them is a shaft of natural light that illuminates a golden monument in the shape of the cannons and banners of the Flag of Haiti. On the surrounding walls are written the names of the heroes of the Revolution.

The museum also contains the rusted anchor of the flagship of Christopher Columbus, the Santa Maria, measuring 4 meters high. One can also find the black hat and cane that belonged to François Duvalier, a copy of the Code Noir, and the crown of the Haitian Emperor, Faustin Soulouque.

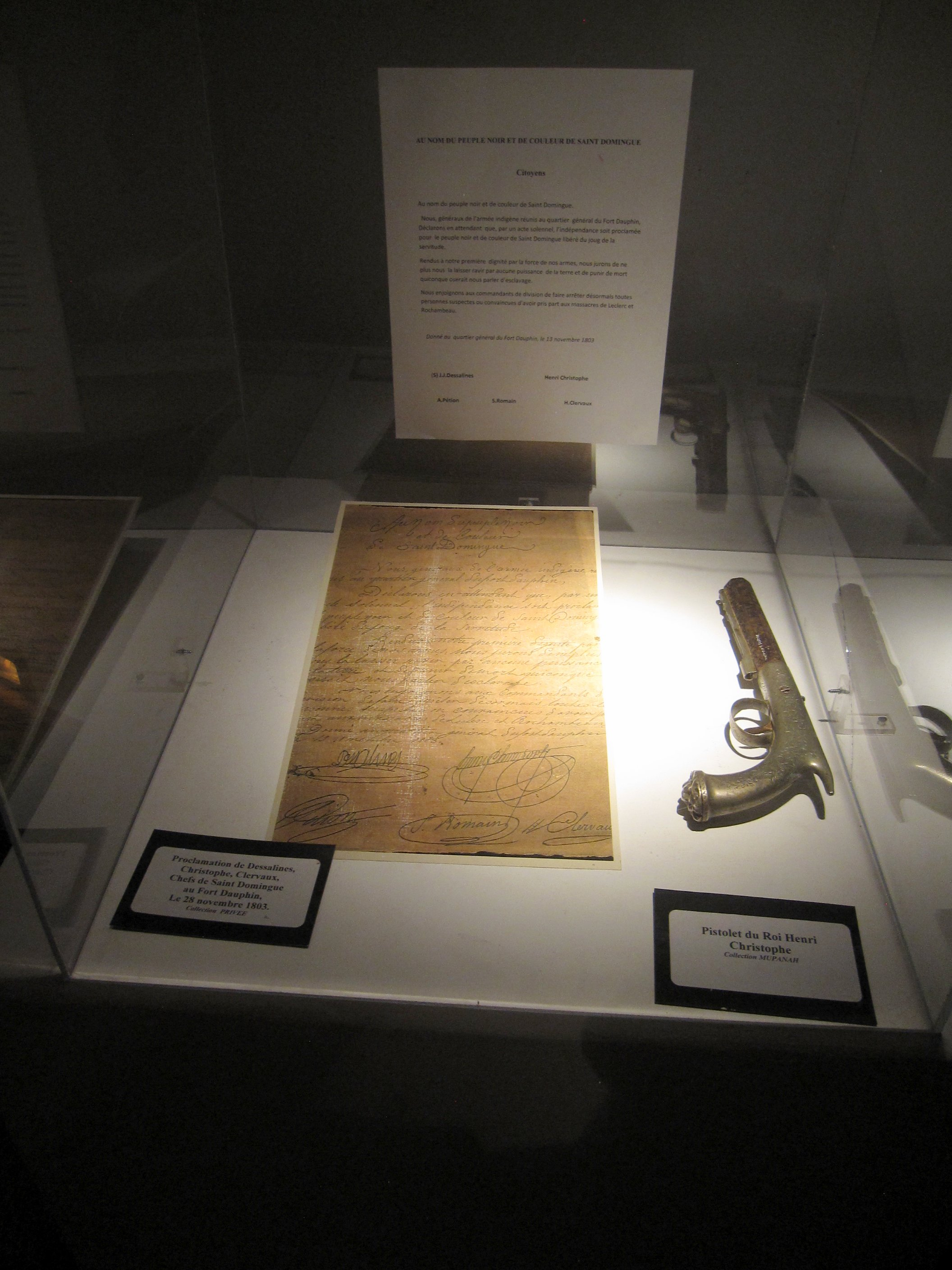
Silver pistol used in the suicide of Henri Christophe

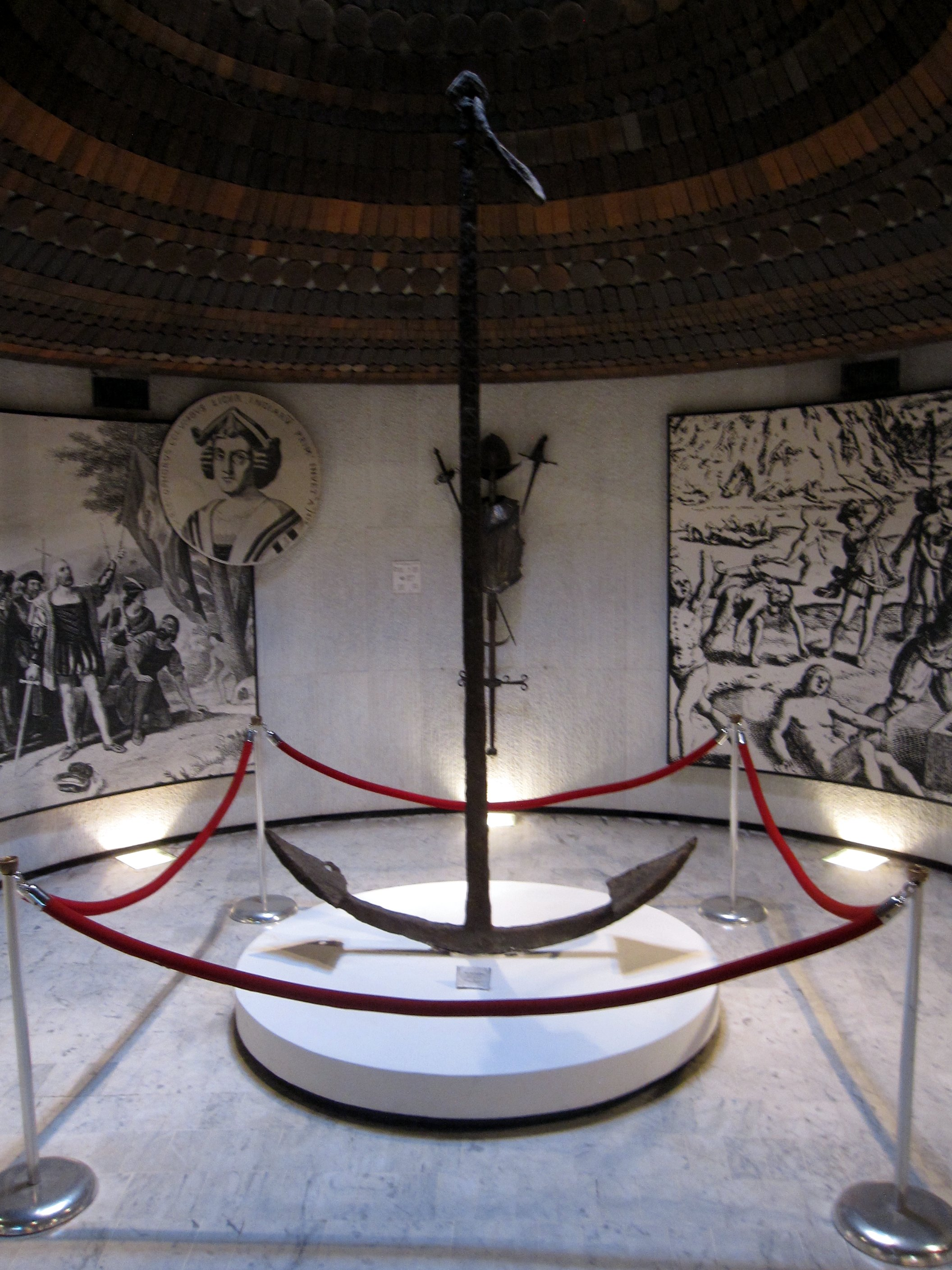
Rusted anchor from the Santa Maria, flagship of Christopher Columbus

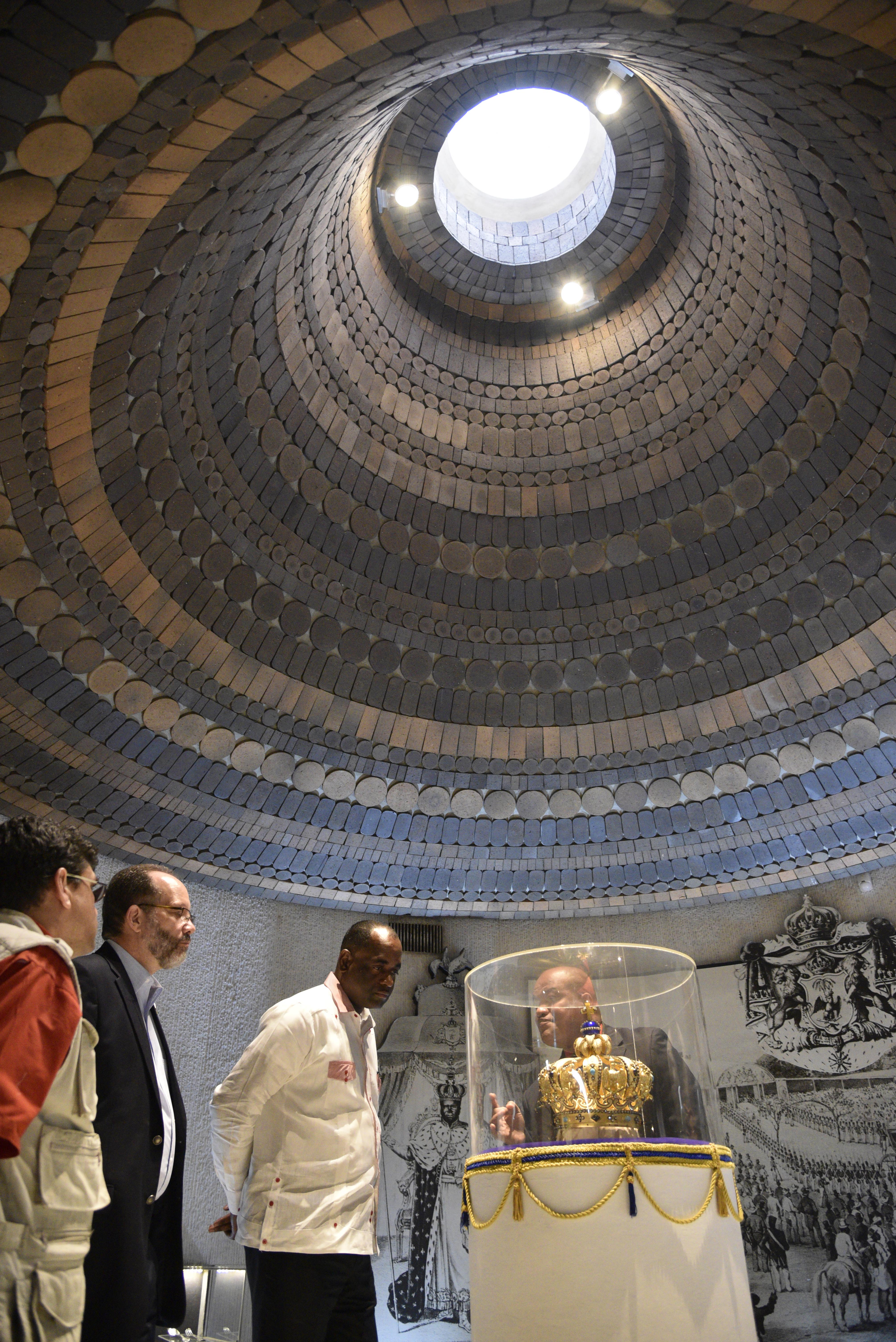
The crown that belonged to Faustin Soulouque (and the Dominican Prime Minister, Roosevelt Skerrit, looking at it)

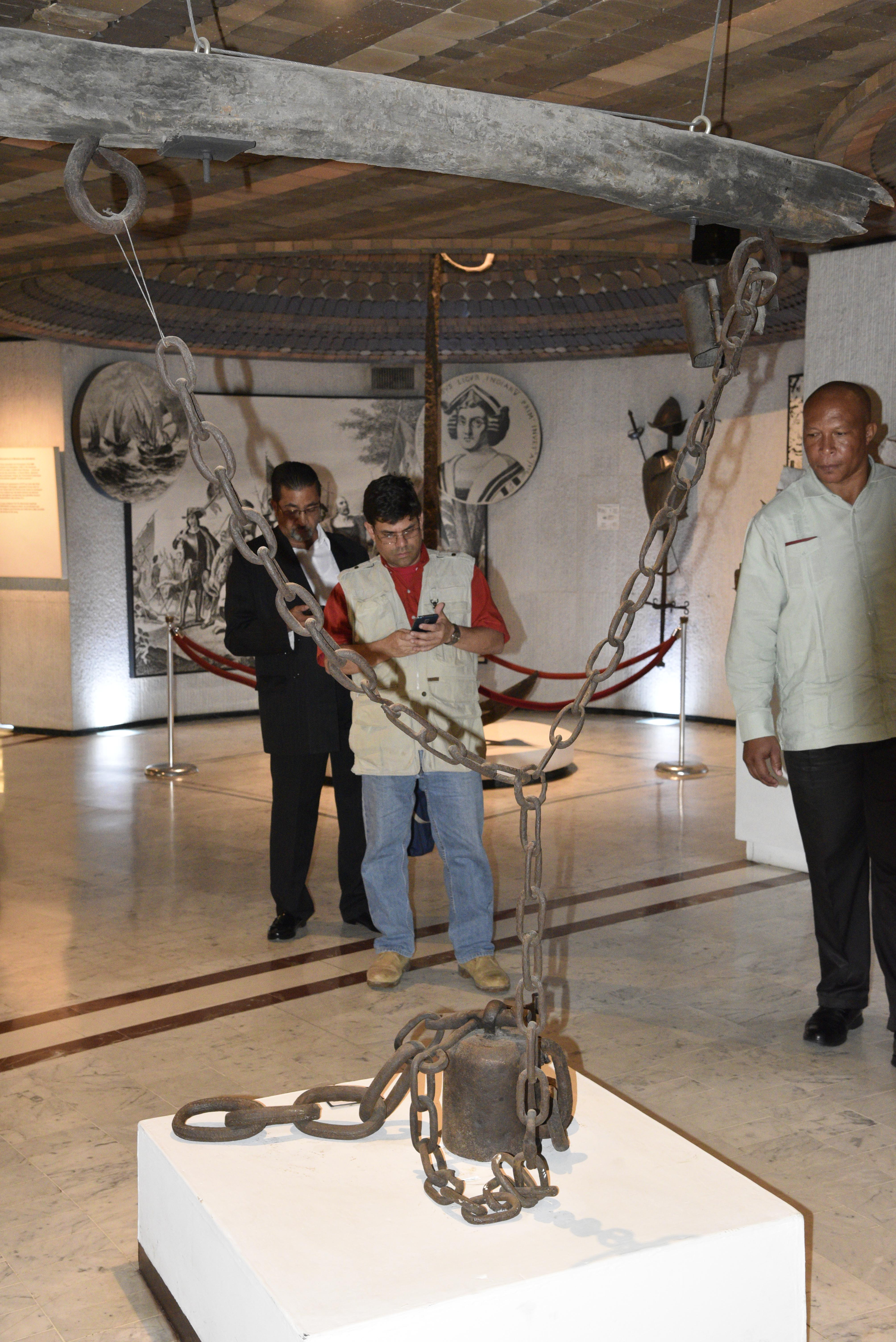
"Slave chains." Haiti is the only state in the modern world that was created from a successful slave revolt.

== History ==
The National Pantheon Museum in Port-au-Prince, Haiti was opened in 1983 during the presidency of Jean-Claude Duvalier. The First lady of Haiti, Michèle Bennett, was instrumental in its conception, inauguration and permanent collection. This cultural center is to perpetuate and disseminate the memory of "Fathers of the Nation".

=== 2010 earthquake ===
In the year 2000, there were seven historical museums in Haiti. Most of them suffered irreparable damage following the earthquake in Haiti in 2010. However, the National Pantheon museum building was only slightly damaged due in part to its semi-buried construction, making it less prone to destruction. By 2012, however, some damage was starting to show its signs; the marble was starting to wear.

== See also ==
- National Museum of Art
- National Museum of Haiti
