= Haitians in the Dominican Republic =

Ethnic diaspora

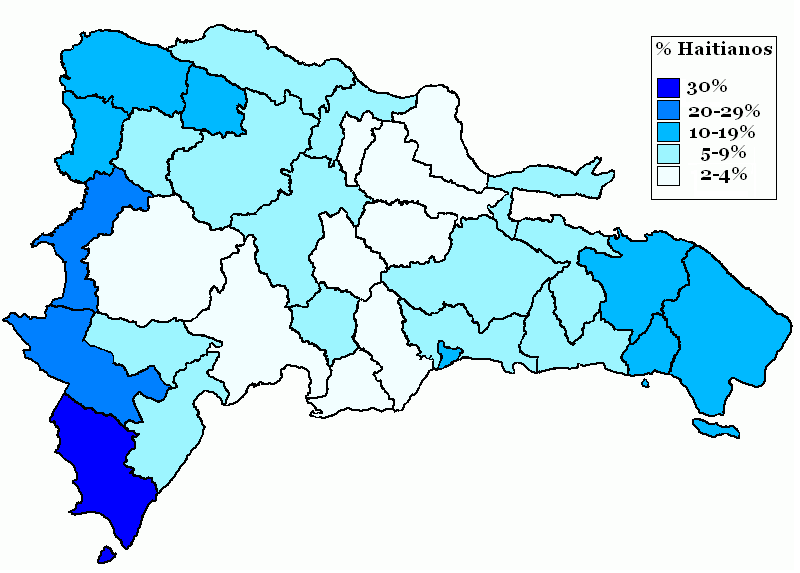
- The percentage of people of Haitian origin among the population for each province in the Dominican Republic; Pedernales has the highest proportion, 30%, and San Cristóbal the lowest, 2%. Nationwide, they are 7% of the population.]]

Total population
- Total population of Haitian ancestry ~800,000 (2008); Residents of the Dominican Republic born in Haiti; 458,233 (2013) (5% of the Dominican population); Dominicans born to both a Haitian and a Dominican parent 105,381 (2012) (1% of the Dominican population); Haitians born in the Dominican Republic to Haitian parents 104,531 (2013) (1% of the Dominican population)

Regions with significant populations
- The borderland, the North-Western Cibao valley, and the Southeastern (including Santo Domingo) region

Languages
- First language: Haitian Creole (96.3%), Spanish (1.7%), French (1.5%); Speak Spanish: 73.8%

Religion
- Roman Catholicism, Evangelicalism, Adventism, Haitian Vodou, other

The Haitian minority of the Dominican Republic (Spanish: Haitianos en la República Dominicana; Haitian Creole: Ayisyen nan Dominikani; French: Haïtiens en République dominicaine) is the largest ethnic minority in the Dominican Republic since the early 20th century.

== History ==
After the Dominican War of Independence ended, Haitian immigration to the Dominican Republic was focalized in the border area; this immigration was encouraged by the Haitian government and consisted of peasants who crossed the border to the Dominican Republic because of the land scarcity in Haiti; in 1874 the Haitian military occupied and de facto annexed La Miel valley and Rancho Mateo, including Veladero (now Belladère). In 1899 the Haitian government claimed the center-west and the south-west of the Dominican Republic, including western Lake Enriquillo, as it estimated that Haitians had become the majority in that area.

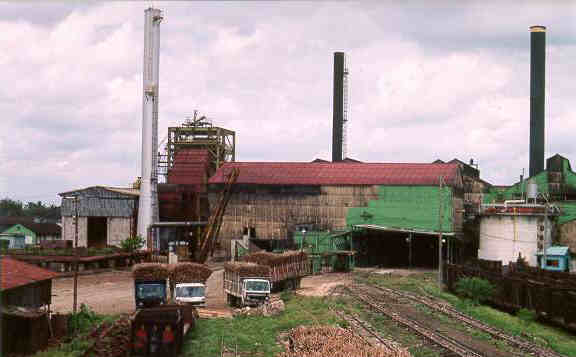
A sugar factory in Consuelo

However, the arrival of Haitians to the rest of the country began after the United States occupation of Haiti and the Dominican Republic around 1916, when US-owned sugar companies imported, annually, thousands of Haitian workers to cut costs.

The 1935 census revealed that several border towns were of Haitian majority; between 1920 and 1935 the Haitian population in the Dominican Republic doubled. In 1936, Haiti received several of these villages located in La Miel valley after a revision of the borderline. Between 1935 and 1937 the dictator Rafael L. Trujillo imposed restrictions on foreign labor and ordered the deportation of Haitians in the border area.

These measures failed due to a corruption scheme involving Dominican military men, civil authorities, and US-owned sugar companies, in the trafficking of undocumented Haitian immigrants. After April 1937, Cuba began the deportation of thousands of Haitians; this led to the arrival of unemployed Haitians en masse to the Dominican Republic.

In August 1937, amid a tour to border towns, Trujillo received complaints of looting, pillaging and cattle raiding, and people insinuated that he had no control over the Haitians. Drunk at a soirée, Trujillo decided that every Haitian should be annihilated. Lieutenant Adolf "Boy" Frappier, a German adviser to President Trujillo, advised him to use the shibboleth perejil (Spanish for "parsley") to identify Haitians by their accent, because the "r" in perejil was difficult for Haitians to pronounce properly.

Thousands of Haitian died along the borderland, the Northwest Line and the Cibao, and thousands more fled to Haiti. In 1975, Joaquín Balaguer, the Dominican Republic's interim Foreign Minister at the time of the massacre, put the number of dead at 17,000. Other estimates compiled by the Dominican historian Bernardo Vega went as high as 35,000. Haitians that were working for the American sugar companies, or living in the East of the country, were not harmed.

As a result of the slaughter, the Dominican Republic paid to Haiti an indemnity of US$ 525,000 (equivalent to $11.76 million in 2025). The genocide sought to be justified on the pretext of fearing infiltration, but was actually also a retaliation, commented on both in national currencies, as well as having been informed by the Military Intelligence Service (SIM), that the Haitian government was cooperating with a plan that sought to overthrow Dominican exiles.

After the events of 1937, Haitian migration to the Dominican Republic halted, until in 1952 Trujillo and the Haitian president Paul Eugène Magloire agreed on the annual shipment of thousands of Haitian laborers to work in American-owned and Dominican-owned sugar plantations, paying the Dominican government a price per head to its Haitian counterpart.

In the 1960s, after the fall of the dictatorship of Trujillo, Haitian immigration boomed: according to Joaquín Balaguer, 30,000 Haitians crossed the border between 1960 and 1965. During the administrations of Joaquín Balaguer, Antonio Guzmán and Salvador Jorge Blanco, in Dominican Republic, and the Duvaliers, in Haiti, the influx of Haitian labourers was continuous and was increasing. Every year contracts were signed between both countries for the importation of over ten thousand Haitians as temporary workers (although they were rarely returned to their country) in exchange for the payment of millions of dollars.

Haitian influence and migration has been strong on and off since the early 1800s, one of the main reasons there has always been tensions.

== Illegal immigration ==
Illegal Haitian immigration is a big problem in the Dominican Republic, as it puts a strain on the Dominican economy and increases tensions between Dominicans and Haitians. It is believed the Dominican border patrol does not protect the border effectively, partly due to the nonchalant attitude of many corrupt politicians.

== Economic and social issues ==
Many Haitians migrate to the Dominican Republic primarily to escape the poverty in Haiti. As of 2023, 58.6% of all Haitians were poor (24% in extreme poverty) and 47.1% were illiterate. The country of 11 million people has a fast-growing population, but over two thirds of the jobs are not in formal work places. Haiti's GDP per capita was $1,300 in 2008, or less than one-sixth of that in the Dominican Republic. As a result, hundreds of thousands of Haitians have migrated to the Dominican Republic, with some estimates of 800,000 Haitians in the country, while others believe they are more than a million. Many Haitian migrants or their descendants work in low-paid and unskilled jobs in building construction, household cleaning, and in plantations.

In 2005 Dominican President Leonel Fernández criticized that collective expulsions of Haitians were "improper and inhumane". After a delegation from the United Nations issued a preliminary report stating that it found a profound problem of racism and discrimination against people of Haitian origin, the Chancellor Dominican Carlos Morales Troncoso gave a formal statement saying "Our border with Haiti has its problems, this is our reality, and this must be understood. It’s important not to confuse national sovereignty with indifference, and not to confuse security with xenophobia"

After the earthquake that struck Haiti in 2010, the number of Haitians doubled to 2 million, most of whom illegally crossed after the border opened for international aid. Human Rights Watch estimated that 70,000 documented Haitian immigrants and 1,930,000 undocumented immigrants were living in Dominican Republic.

Before 2010, the Constitution of the Dominican Republic generally granted citizenship to anyone born in the country, except children of diplomats and persons "in transit". The 2010 constitution was amended to define all undocumented residents as "in transit". On September 23, 2013, the Dominican Republic Constitutional Court issued a ruling that retroactively applied this definition to 1929, the year Haiti and the Dominican Republic formalized the border.

The decision stripped Dominican citizenship from about 210,000 people who were born in the Dominican Republic after 1929 but are descended from undocumented immigrants from Haiti. Many of the Dominican Republic-born do not have Haitian citizenship and have never been to Haiti; the decision rendered them at least temporarily stateless. Some Haitians began leaving voluntarily or in response to ethnic violence.

The government set a deadline of June 17, 2015 for affected people to leave the Dominican Republic, as nighttime "bandits" threatened Haitians with violence and deportation. By August 2015 "hundreds" had been deported.

Haitian descendants who have been in the Dominican Republic for many generations tend to primarily speak a broken form of Spanish with a strong Haitian accent, even moreso than Haitian Creole similar to how many assimilated Haitian Americans speak English more than Creole. Many try to mimic Dominican cultural traits in an effort to blend in and assimilate into the native Dominican population in order to avoid xenophobia and/or violence.

== Demographics ==
The place of birth of the Haitian immigrants in the Dominican Republic in 2012. The majority are originally from Ouest (24%) and Nord (19%). Just 0.2% of the Haitian immigrants in the D.R. are from Nippes.

In 2012, almost 75% of the Haitians living in the Dominican Republic had been living in the D.R. for less than 10 years. Almost 70% of Haitian workers earn less than 10,000 Dominican pesos (DOP) per month; about 7% earned more than 20,000 DOP per month. Those who live in urban areas earn up to 70% more than those in rural areas.

In 2012, the average median income was 10,262 DOP per month; in comparison, an average Dominican earns 12,441 DOP and an average non-Haitian immigrant earns 39,318 DOP per month. Just 10% of Haitians send remittances to Haiti, with 5.4% sending with a frequency of once per quarter or higher. Most remittances sent back to Haiti tend to come rather from Haitian-Americans, with 8$ out of every 10$ sent back to Haiti coming from the US in 2022, a total of $3.1 billion.

The 1920 Census registered 28,258 Haitians; the 1935 Census registered 52,657 Haitians. The Haitian population decreased to 18,772 in the 1950 Census, as a result of the cession of Dominican territory to Haiti in 1936, and the 1937 Parsley Massacre as well.

In 2012, there were 458,233 Haitian immigrants living in the Dominican Republic, 65.4% of them were males and 76.1% between 18 and 39 years old.

A large number of Haitian women, often arriving with several health problems, cross the border to Dominican soil during their last weeks of pregnancy to obtain necessary medical care for childbirth, since Dominican public hospitals cannot deny medical services based on nationality or legal status. According to the Ministry of Health, in 2018 roughly 24% of neonates in the Dominican Republic were born to a Haitian mother, Four years later, that figure had increased to 31.9%.

=== Haitians in the Dominican Republic by censuses ===
- 1920: 28.258 — 3.1% of the total population
- 1935: 52.657— 3.6% of the total population
- 1950: 18.772 — 0.9% of the total population
- 1960: 29.350 — 1.0% of the total population
- 1970: 97.142 — 2.4% of the total population
- 1980: 113.150 (excludes urban areas)— 4.3% of the rural population
- 1981: Not applicable
- 1991: 245.000 (of Haitian origin) — 3.4% of the total population
- 1993: Not applicable
- 2002: Not applicable
- 2005: 196.837 — 2.35% of the total population
- 2010: 311.969 — 3.30% of the total population
- 2012: 668.145 (of Haitian origin) — 7.1% of the total population
- 2017: 751.080 (of Haitian origin) — 7.4% of the total population
- 2024: 554.000 (of Haitian origin)

*Immigrant censuses are italicized.

== Sports ==
=== Baseball ===
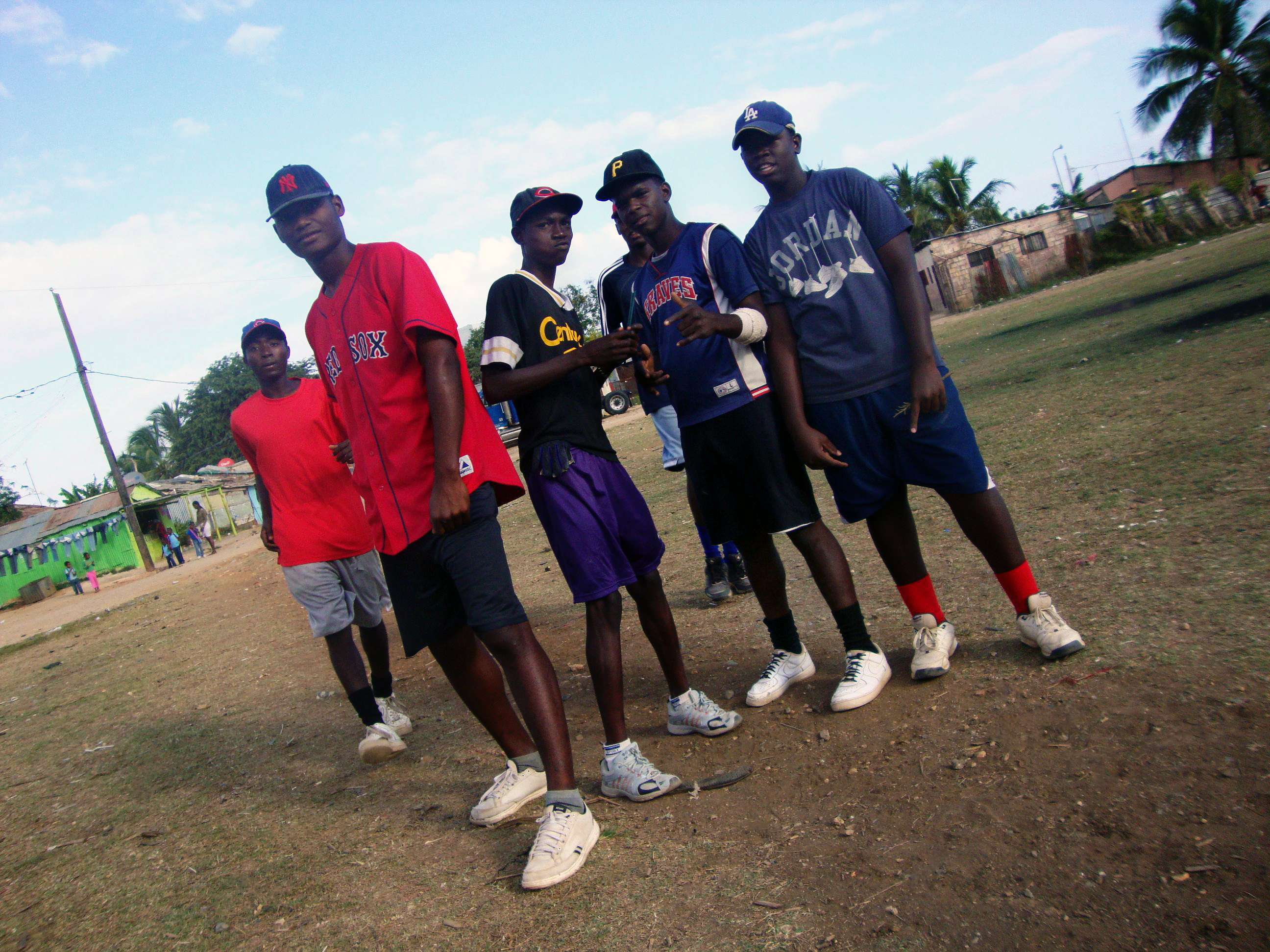
Boys from a Batey in the Province of San Pedro de Macorís

According to the president of the Confederation of Professional Baseball of the Caribbean (CBPC), Juan Francisco Puello Herrera, The inability to obtain identification documents, often result in some of these athletes not being signed by professional teams. Many players have come from the bateyes of the provinces of San Pedro de Macoris, La Romana, Haina, Nizao, Boca Chica and Barahona.

Their origins are often kept hidden for either fear of discrimination or to alter birth records to appear younger, which is a common practice in general in the Dominican Republic. Some choose to not keep their surname of origin, in order not to be so easily recognized.

=== Basketball ===
According to Junior Paez and Ramón Ceballos, the administrative and eligibility directors of the Dominican Basketball Federation (FEDOMBAL), there is no record of participation of Dominican basketball players of Haitian descent.

== Notable Haitian Dominicans ==
=== Political figures ===
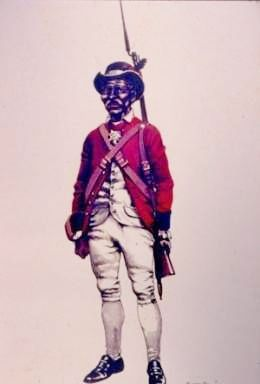
Pablo Alí was a chief military commander who was in charge of the Battalion 31 and freed slaves which joined the ranks of the Dominican army. He is said to have been the "most prominent, achieving great military distinction in Santo Domingo."

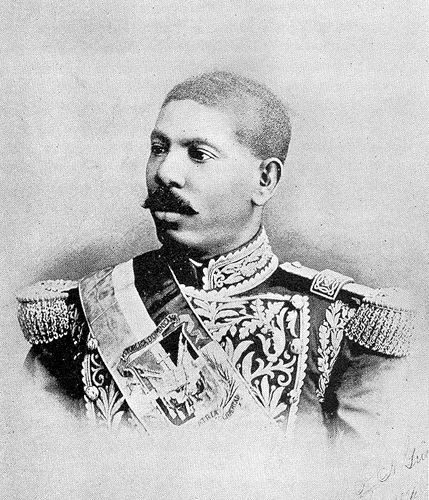
Ulises Heureaux was a three-time president of the Dominican Republic, until his assassination.

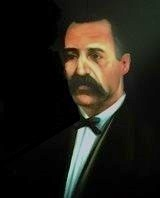
Santiago Rodríguez Masagó was a military leader known for having opposed the annexation of the Dominican Republic to Spain and for being one of the rebels of the famous El Grito de Capotillo that began the Dominican Restoration War.

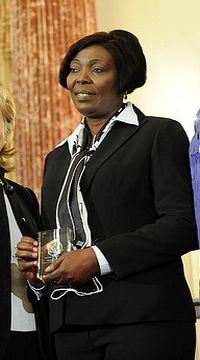
Sonia Pierre was a human rights advocate in the Dominican Republic who worked to end antihaitianismo, the discrimination against individuals of Haitian origin in both Haiti and the Dominican Republic. She won the 2006 Robert F. Kennedy Human Rights Award.

=== Athletes ===
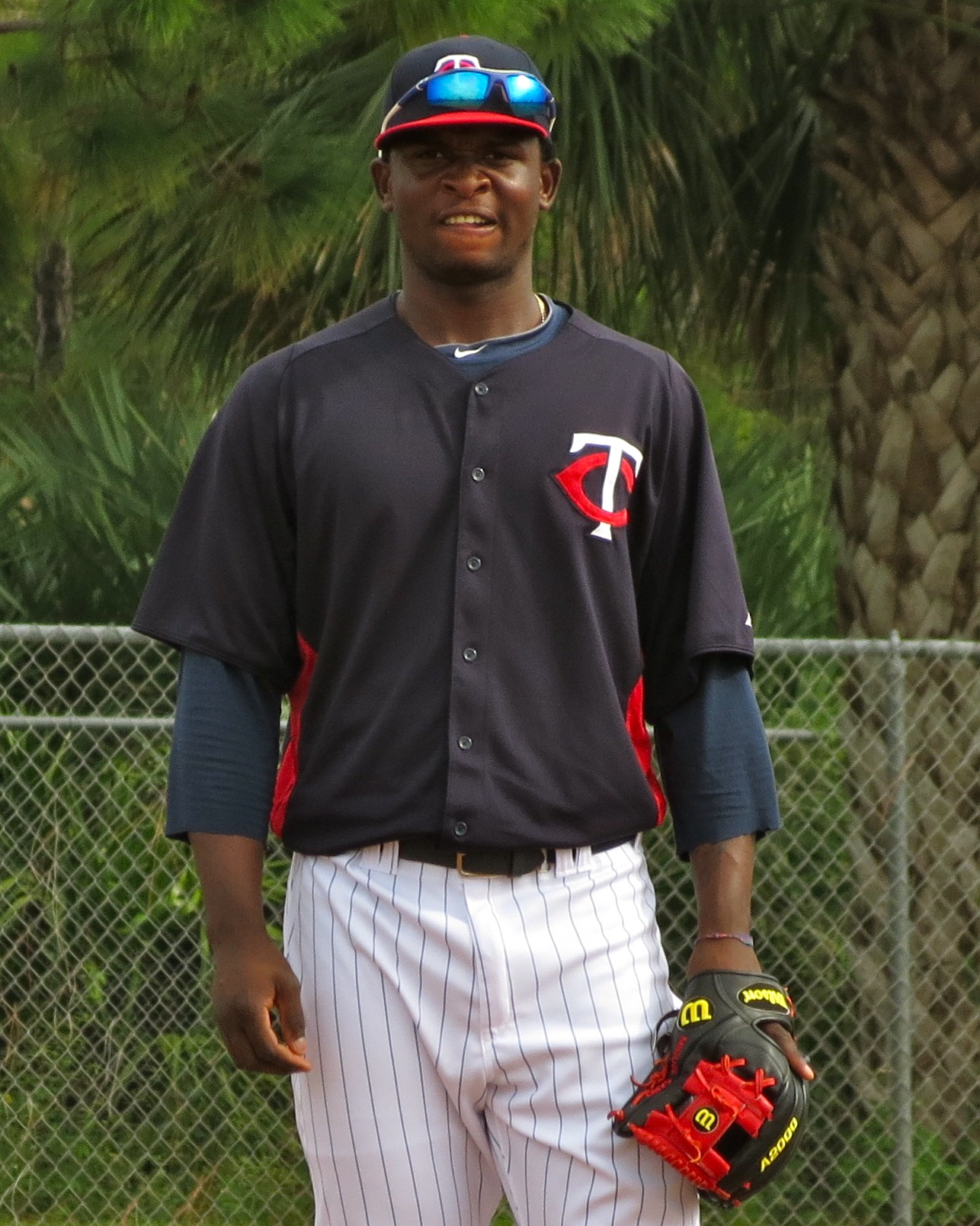
Miguel Sanó is a Major League Baseball player for the Minnesota Twins.

Fernando Guerrero is a professional middleweight boxer.

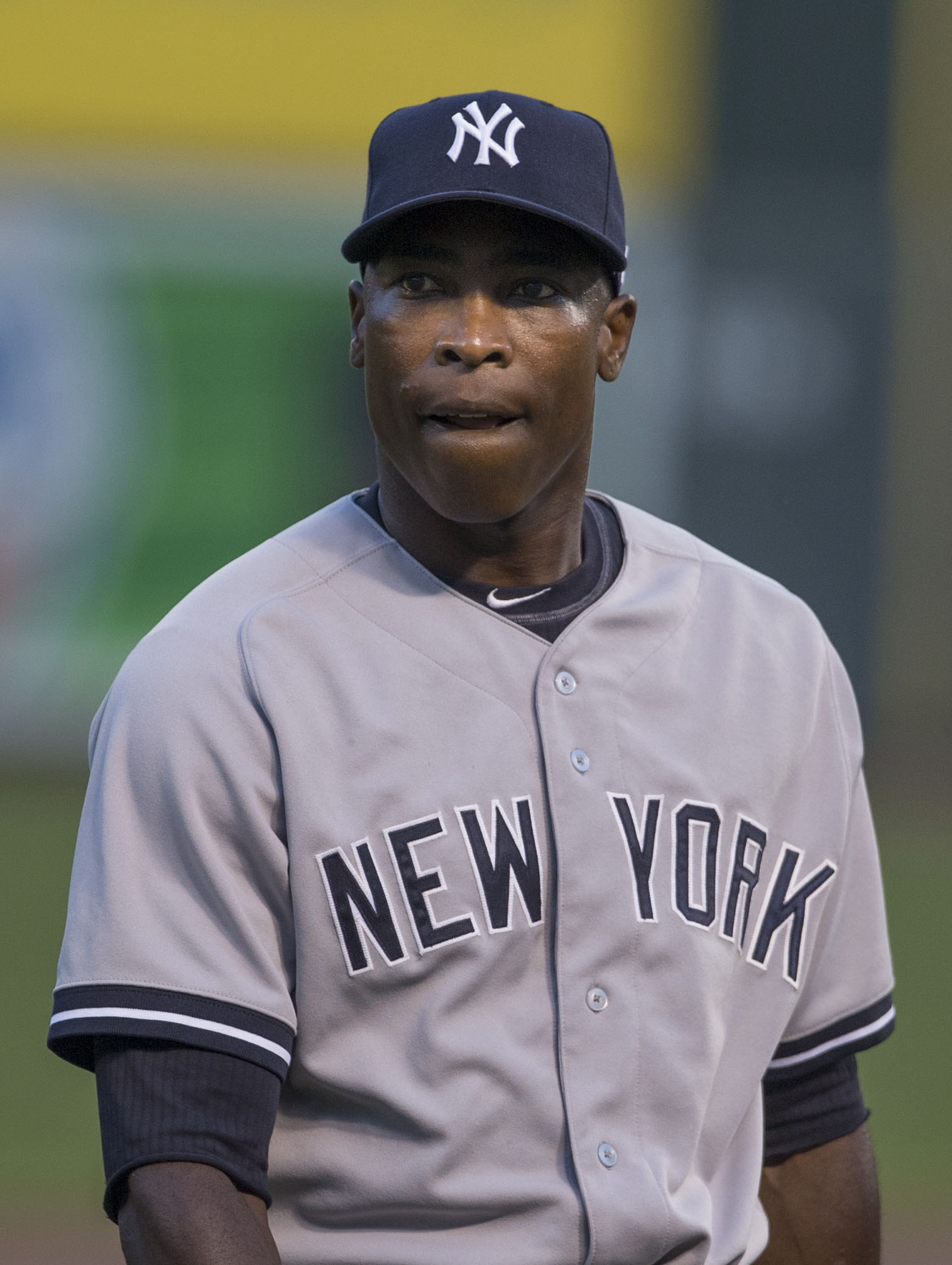
Alfonso Soriano is a former all-star Major League Baseball player.

== See also ==
- Beheadings of Moca
- 2013 Dominican Republic–Haiti diplomatic crisis
- Afro-Dominicans
- Antihaitianismo
- Dominican Republic–Haiti relations
- Haitian occupation of Santo Domingo
- Parsley Massacre
- Racism in the Dominican Republic
- Frespañol
