= Lizania Cruz =

Dominican artist

- Born: 1983 (age 42–43); Dominican Republic
- Education: Philadelphia University
- Style: Participatory art, installation art
- Website: lizania.com

Lizania Cruz is a Dominican visual artist, designer and participatory artist based in New York. Cruz's art examines how human migration "affects ways of being and belonging". Her multimedia installations and projects frequently employ audience participation, drawing on archives as well as the testimonies and oral histories of her subjects. Her projects have incorporated floral arrangements designed by undocumented workers in response to the immigration policy of Donald Trump, testimonials from people about how the American Dream died for them, and investigations into the internalization of the historical narratives of racism in the Dominican Republic.

Cruz graduated from Philadelphia University. She has had solo exhibitions at A.I.R. Gallery and the CUE Art Foundation.

== Early life and education ==
Lizania Cruz was born in the Dominican Republic in 1983. She spent much of her youth at her grandparents' home in Boca Chica.

Cruz earned an associate degree from the Altos de Chavón School of Design in 2004 and a bachelor's degree in graphic design from Philadelphia University in 2007. She later moved to New York and worked as a graphic designer, developing brand language for Anthropologie.

== Art career ==
Cruz's art examines how human migration "affects ways of being and belonging". Her projects focus attention on "a pluralistic narrative on migration", employing audience participation, oral histories and research.

For her 2017 photo series Flowers for Immigration, Cruz invited undocumented workers in the flower industry to design floral arrangements in response to the immigration policy of Donald Trump. Cruz drew inspiration from the 1960s flower power movement and the Portuguese Carnation Revolution for the work. Bouquets arranged by the florists were accompanied by stories on the project website. Cruz dried the flowers with the plan to use them to create resin sculptures.

Cruz was commissioned by curators of El Museo del Barrio's triennial, Estamos Bien: La Trienal 20/21 to create a two-part project entitled Obituaries of The American Dream. For the first part of the project, Cruz collected testimonials from people about "when and how the American Dream died" for them. The second half of the project involved a livestreamed "ideathon" to formulate a new American Dream and the production of a newspaper which included the obituaries.

Cruz's long-term project Investigation of the Dominican Racial Imaginary addresses the internalization of the historical narratives of racism, sentiments against Haitians, and the erasure of African heritage in the Dominican Republic through the examination of archives and public testimonies. Cruz received a fellowship from New York's A.I.R. Gallery for the work's first chapter, and her solo exhibition, In Search of Motives, was presented in the form of an investigation, including witnesses and suspects represented by prints created through silkscreening, photolithography, and etching. She installed a mind map of papers and archives in the gallery and included a video projection combining archival footage with interviews. For the second part of Investigation of the Dominican Racial Imaginary, Cruz produced the solo exhibition Gathering Evidence: Santo Domingo & New York City for the CUE Art Foundation in 2021. The exhibition included the multi-part participatory project ¡Se Buscan Testigos! [Looking for Witnesses!] Portrait of a Detective in NYC and was curated by Guadalupe Maravilla.

In 2021, Cruz's film Freedom Budget, inspired by Martin Luther King Jr.'s A Freedom Budget for All Americans was shown at the Brooklyn Academy of Music for its tribute to King.

The Center for Urban Pedagogy selected Cruz to collaborate on a poster design to inform job applicants of their rights under New York's Fair Chance Act if they have criminal records.

Cruz had a residency at International Studio & Curatorial Program in 2022. As part of her We the News series, she exhibited Every Immigrant Is a Writer/Todo Inmigrante Es un Escritor, an installation incorporating migrant testimonies from various countries into a wooden newsstand.

Cruz has been commissioned to exhibit a multimedia, participatory installation called Evidence 071: Frederick Douglass and The Commission of Inquiry at The Shed in October 2023.
