= Palma Sola =

Palma Sola may refer to:

Alphabetical by country

- Palma Sola, Jujuy, Argentina
- Palmasola, a maximum security prison in Santa Cruz, Bolivia
- Palma Sola, Santa Catarina, Brazil
- Mataguá, formerly Palma Sola, a village in Cuba
- Palma Sola, Dominican Republic
  - Palma Sola massacre, 1962
- Palma Sola, Florida, US
- Palma Sola Bay, Florida, US
- Palma Sola (Puerto Rico)
- Palmasola Municipality, Falcón, Venezuela
