= List of massacres in the Dominican Republic =

The following is a list of massacres that have occurred in the Dominican Republic (numbers may be approximate):

Name	Date	Location	Deaths	Victims	Notes
Beheadings of Moca	1805	Present-day Dominican Republic	estimated 900 (500 at Moca), (400 at Santiago)	Civilians of Santiago de los Caballeros and Moca	The massacre was headed by Jean Jacques Dessalines and Henri Cristophe who led Haitian troops. There was also massive property damage.
Parsley massacre	October 1937	Northern frontier	12,000–38,000	Haitian immigrants and Dominicans of Haitian descent	The massacre was committed by the Dominican army under Rafael Trujillo in the borderlands.
El Desalojo (The Eviction)	1938	Southern frontier	Hundreds	Haitian immigrants and Dominicans of Haitian descent	Dominican civilians reportedly cooperated in the killing.
Assassination of Mirabal sisters	25 November 1960	La Cumbre, between Santiago and Puerto Plata.	4	Mirabal sisters	Three of the Mirabal sisters, Patria, Minerva, and Maria Teresa, outspoken opponents of dictator Rafael Trujillo, along with their driver Rufino de la Cruz were killed by Military Intelligence Service (SIM). They were stopped, beaten and strangled to death
Palma Sola massacre	December 1962	Palma Sola	600–800	Leaders of the religious Liborista movement and their followers.	The Dominican military dropped napalm on the Liboristas from airplanes – burning six hundred people to death.
Operation Limpieza	May 1965	Santo Domingo	Unknown	Suspected rebels	The mass killings were committed by the government of Gen. Antonio Imbert.
1984 April riots	April 1984	Dominican Republic	125-200	civilians	accepted that more than 125 people died, but press sources at the time claimed that the death toll exceeded 200, since the hospital morgues were not enough, the hospital emergencies were full of wounded and all the police and military crews full of detainees and beaten.
Higüey Prison fire	6-7 March 2005	Higüey Prison, Higüey	136-137	prisoners	A fight between inmates ends with a fire caused by the fire in the mattresses
Los Alcarrizos massacre	August 20, 2022	Los Alcarrizos, Santo Domingo province	4	civilians	1 injured
