= Human rights in the Dominican Republic =

Human rights in the Dominican Republic constitute the civil and political rights and freedoms legally protected under the Constitution of the Dominican Republic and enforced by the government through common and statutory law. The majority of human rights disputes are presided over by the highest court of constitutional appeal, the Dominican Constitutional Tribunal. These rights and freedoms have developed over time in accordance with the Dominican Republic's expansion from the former Spanish colony of the Captaincy General of Santo Domingo to its modern state formation. The history of human rights in the state have also been marked by the oscillation between democratic administrations, such as the current presidency of Danilo Medina, and authoritarian administrations, most significantly the dictatorial regime of Rafael Trujillo between 16 August 1930 and 16 August 1938. As a member of the Organization of American States and the United Nations, the Dominican Republic is party to myriad legal treaties and covenants which propagate the human rights standards of the international community and have integrated the majority of these human rights directives into their domestic legislation.

The various administrations of the Dominican Republic have historically come under fire for their poor human rights record, which includes extrajudicial killings, torture, arbitrary arrest and detention, attacks on press freedoms and restrictions on the movement of migrants. Certain groups and minorities in Dominican society including the Haitian ethnic minority, women and LGBTQI+ citizens have been the victims of grave abuses of their human rights, attracting widespread condemnation from the international community. In particular, the government's treatment of Dominicans with Haitian parentage earned the country a place on the Inter-American Commission on Human Rights’s “black list” in April 2017, a list reserved for countries with the most serious violations of human rights. This was primarily due to the 2013 Constitutional Tribunal decision which deprived ethnically Haitian Dominicans of citizenship and the government's following inability to compensate for and correct the discriminatory treatment in the wake of international outcry.

== Legal framework ==
=== Constitution of the Dominican Republic ===
The current Constitution of the Dominican Republic, which came into effect on June 13, 2015, contains a limited description of the rights of its citizens indicative of the Republic's history of political oscillation between democratic and authoritarian administrations. The document as it currently stands contains narrow protections for civil and political rights and adheres to the principles of separation of powers and checks and balances, though its constant state of flux and the scarcity of constitutionalism as a prevailing ideology among the Dominican political elite contributes to wider doubt over its efficacy.

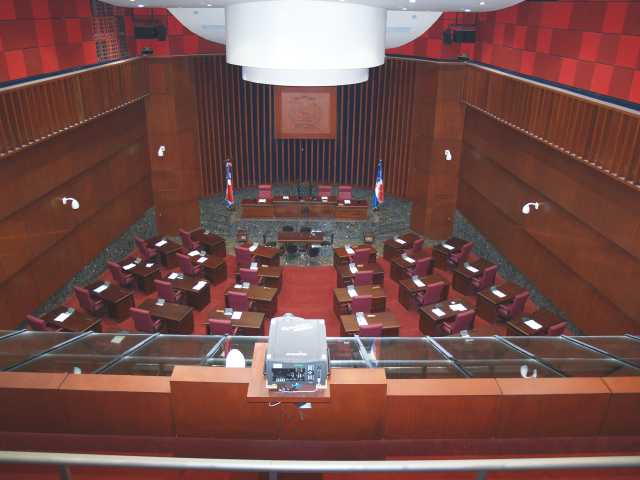
The floor of the Chamber of the Senate of the Dominican Republic.

Article 8 of the Constitution details the human rights norms that dominate the current political climate, stating that “[t]he effective protection of the rights of the human person and the maintenance of the means for his progressive development within a system of individual liberty and social justice compatible with public policy, the general well being and the rights of all are recognised as the principal aims of the state”. This article includes, among others, the specific prohibition of torture, stating that “torture or any other penalty or procedure harmful to, or entailing the loss or diminution of, the physical integrity or health of the individual may in no circumstances be established, imposed or enforced” and freedom of religious practice in the event that is not done ‘improperly and disrespectfully”.

Of particular significance are the provisions in the Constitution which elucidate the situations in which the government of the Dominican Republic has the authority to interfere with the limited human rights enshrined, including situations of extreme danger to the country's sovereignty, public disorder or natural disasters. In addition, the document outlines the harsh consequences in the event that a government official interferes with or orders the interference with the civil rights and freedoms of its citizens.

=== International legal obligations ===
The Dominican Republic is a member of the United Nations, and is party to numerous human rights treaties and covenants. Many of these documents have been integrated into the national human rights framework by way of ratification.

Treaties ratified by the Dominican administration include:

- International Covenant on Civil and Political Rights (ratified Jan 4, 1978)
- International Covenant on Economic, Social and Cultural Rights (ratified Jan 4, 1978)
- Convention on the Elimination of All Forms of Discrimination Against Women (ratified Sept 2, 1982)
- International Convention on the Elimination of All Forms of Racial Discrimination (ratified May 25, 1983)
- Convention on the Rights of the Child (ratified June 11, 1991)
- Optional Protocol on the Sale of Children, Child Prostitution and Child Pornography (ratified 6 Dec 2006)
- Convention on the Rights of Persons with Disabilities (ratified 18 Aug 2009)
- United Nations Convention against Torture (ratified 24 Jan 2012)
- Optional Protocol on the Involvement of Children in Armed Conflict (ratified 14 Oct 2014)
- Second Optional Protocol to the International Covenant on Civil and Political Rights involving the abolition of the death penalty (ratified 21 Sep 2016).

The Dominican Republic has signed but is yet to ratify the International Convention for the Protection of All Persons from Enforced Disappearance. Two significant treaties that the country has yet to sign include the International Convention on the Protection of the Rights of All Migrant Workers and Members of Their Families and the Convention on the Reduction of Statelessness, which has attracted criticisms from human rights groups wary of the administration's treatment of its Haitian minority.

The Dominican Republic is also a member of the Organisation of American States, with a Dominican judge having served on the Inter-American Court of Human Rights.

== Treatment of particular groups and minorities ==
=== Haitian racial minority ===
The current wellbeing of Haitian migrants and ethnically Haitian citizens of the Dominican Republic is an ongoing issue. Historically, the political elite of the Dominican Republic have used the Haitian minority as a scapegoat for their national ills, with a United Nations Human Rights Council report on the 'elimination of racism, racial discrimination, xenophobia and related forms of intolerance' claiming the existence of a 'profound and entrenched problem of racism and discrimination in Dominican society”. This systematic scapegoating has been attributed largely to historical colonial relations between the colonists of Santo Domingo and the black Haitian population, and the anti-Haitian sentiment used to galvanise the ethnic Spanish population into supporting the independence of the Dominican Republic following Haiti's 1822 annexation of Santo Domingo. This sentiment, also referred to as antihaitianismo, underpinned the dictatorial regime of Rafael Leónidas Trujillo Molina, with the 1937 massacre of between nine and twenty thousand Haitian labourers near the national border, commonly known as the Parsley massacre, kickstarting the development of violent Dominican nationalism and the retroactive historiographical endeavours of Dominican elites to demonise the Haitian minority. Notable Dominican intellectual Manuel Arturo Peña Batlle once stated:

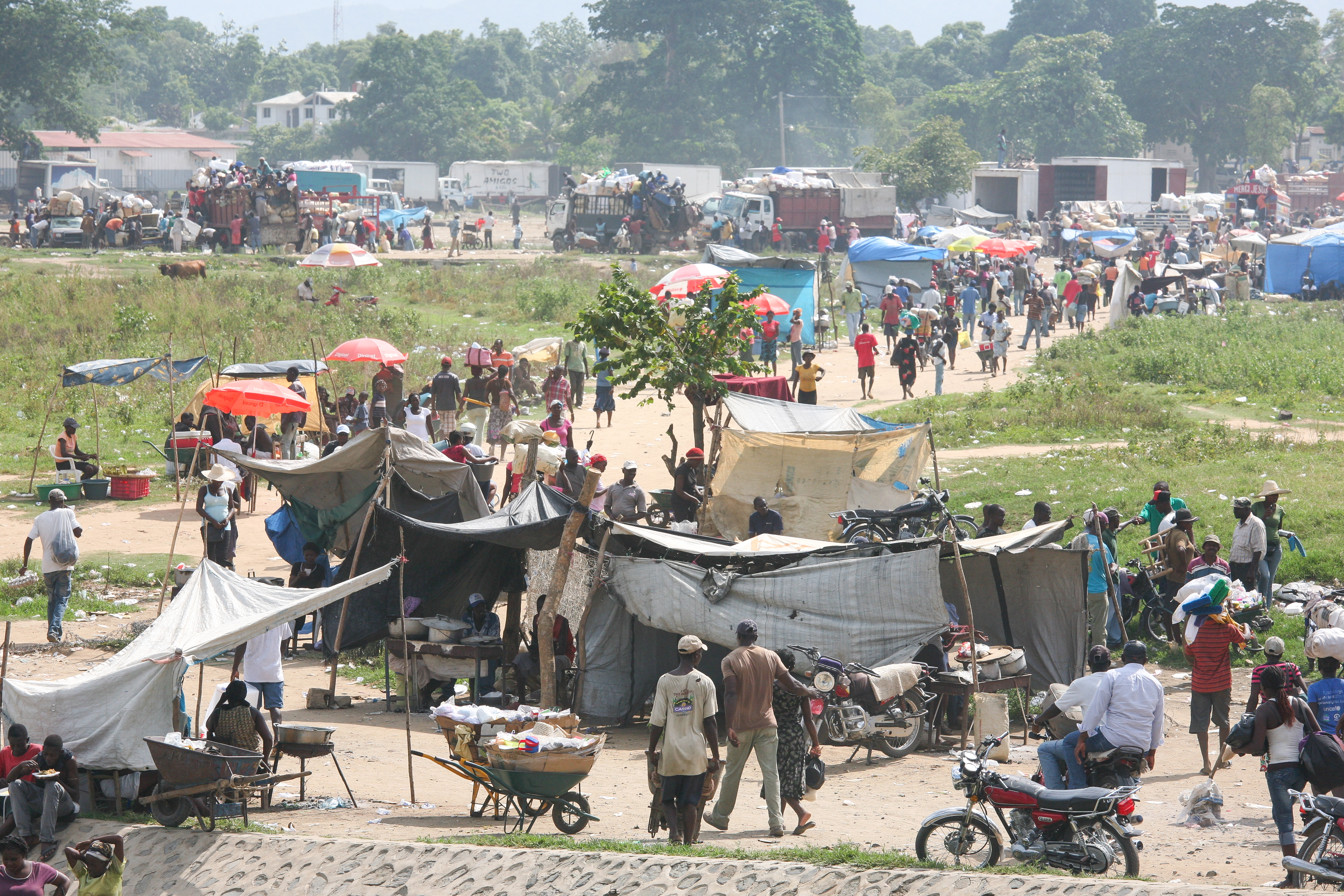
At the Border of Haiti and the Dominican Republic

“....there is no feeling of humanity, nor political reason, nor any circumstantial convenience that can force us to look indifferently at the Haitian penetration. That type is frankly undesirable…the Haitian that enters [our country] lives afflicted by numerous and capital vices and is necessarily affected by diseases and physiological deficiencies which are endemic at the lowest levels of that society.”

Human rights groups insist that Haitian migrants and their Haitian descendants are protected under the Declaration on the Rights of Persons Belonging to National or Ethnic, Religious and Linguistic Minorities.

The citizenship status of ethnic Haitian migrants and descendants has been the source of major controversy. The 2005 ruling of Dilcia Yean and Violeta Bosico v. Dominican Republic by the Inter-American Court of Human Rights accused the Dominican government of infringing upon international law and its own domestic legislation in relation to refusing nationality and education to children born to Haitian families in the state on the basis that they were born to foreigners ‘in transit’. The constitution introduced in January 2010 garnered further criticism when it expanded its exceptions for citizenships to include children born in the Dominican Republic to non-citizen parents.

In September 2013, the highest court of constitutional appeal, the Dominican Constitutional Tribunal, issued the judgment TC 0168-13 which reinterpreted the country's citizenship laws to deprive a significant number of Haitian Dominicans of their natural citizenship. The resulting law, Migration Law No. 285-04, denied undocumented Haitian migrants and their descendants a number of human rights including the ability to enrol in tertiary education, their capacity for employment or their access to an acceptable standard of health care. The United Nations High Commissioner for Refugees estimated that over 200,000 undocumented people were affected by the court ruling. The decision was met with widespread condemnation from the international human rights community and resulted in calls to restore their citizenship and put an end to forced deportations. In 2014, the current President of the Dominican Republic, Danila Medina instituted Law 169/14 with the publicly stated intention of working to restore the nationality of the undocumented migrant families affected. However, the law was widely criticised for its failure to automatically reinstate Dominican nationality, which has currently left thousands in a condition of statelessness and vulnerability to the exploitation of their rights. In October 2016, the Inter-American Court of Human Rights ruled that the disproportionate deprivation of citizenship of black, ethnically Haitian Dominicans brought about by these laws and the government's ongoing failures to counteract the social harms violated the American Convention on Human Rights, and in April 2017 the court used the same rationale to justify their placement on their human rights ‘black list’.

=== Women ===
==== Sexual harassment and violence ====
The prevalence of gender-based violence in the Dominican Republic has drawn the attention of various international human rights organisations. A 2018 report by the Prosecutor's General Office indicated that over 71,000 reports of gender-based violence had been filed in that year alone, and over 6,300 reports of sexual offences. The National Police provided statistics in a Human Rights Watch report in 2016 indicating that more than 1,300 deaths recorded between 2008 and 2014 were the result of gender-based violence. However, notable human rights group Amnesty International suggests that the official numbers are but a small percentage of the real figures, citing the pervasive culture of sexual violence and torture in the Dominican police force and the small likelihood of officers facing justice due to its normalisation in Dominican society.

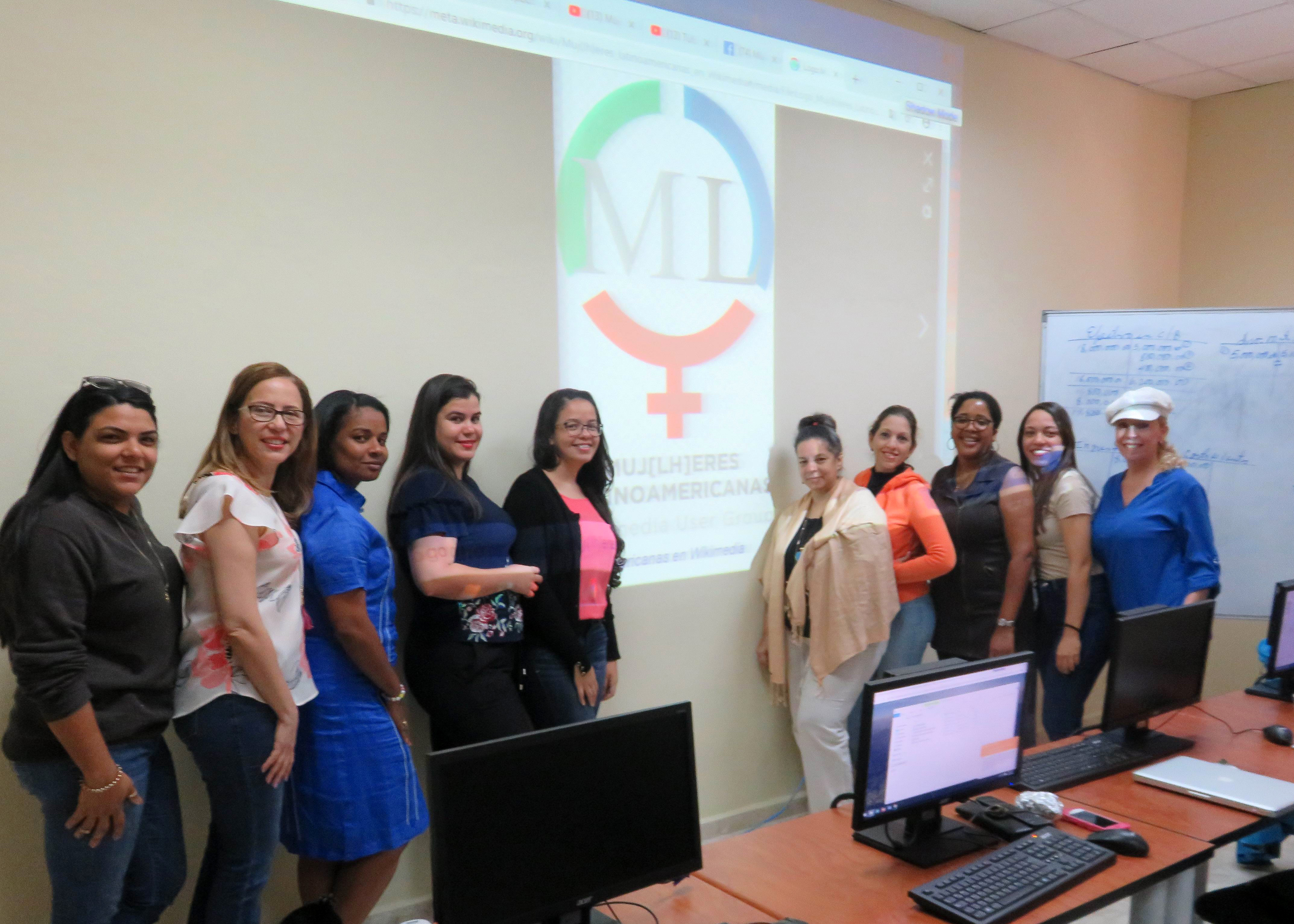
Members of the regional feminist NGO 'Mujeres Latinoamericanas' gathering in the Dominican Republic

Officially, the law of the Dominican Republic punishes rape and other forms of gender-based violence, including incest and sexual aggression, with sentences for rape convictions extending to a fifteen-year prison sentence. The law also categories sexual harassment in the workplace as a misdemeanour carrying a one-year prison sentence and significant fines, though union workers have voiced doubt over the enforcement of the law in this regard. The Ministry of Women works towards reducing gender-based violence and increasing substantial equality through the provision of awareness programs and industry training, as well as the operation of domestic violence shelters. However, women's rights groups operating in the region, such as the Mujeres Latinoamericanas, have cast serious doubt on the Ministry's efficacy, criticising both the lack of funding to relevant services and the lack of coordination between national institutions.

==== Sex workers ====
Commercial sex work within the Dominican Republic is currently a criminal offence, with sex workers receiving minimal protection from severe violations of their human rights, according to a 2019 report by Amnesty International. Research by Dan Danielsen and Karen Engle in 1995 (as cited in Cabezas. 2002) postulates that the intensity of the government crackdown on prostitution is due to outrage over deviation from the monogamous, heterosexual reproductive relationship norms which dominate Dominican society. The verbal, physical and sexual abuse inflicted upon sex workers both nationally and regionally has been extensively documented, described by Erika Guevara-Rosas, directors of the Americas at Amnesty International, as an ‘epidemic across Latin America and the Caribbean’. In addition to government-inflicted violence, sex workers face scant protection from violence from third parties such as customers or intermediaries, which Amalia Lucia Cabezas attributes to the public perception of sex workers as ‘guilty’ and unworthy of equal treatment under the law. The report also mentions further harassment towards more vulnerable members of the sex worker community, specifically transgender sex workers who are statistically more susceptible to state-sanctioned torture.

==== Reproductive rights ====
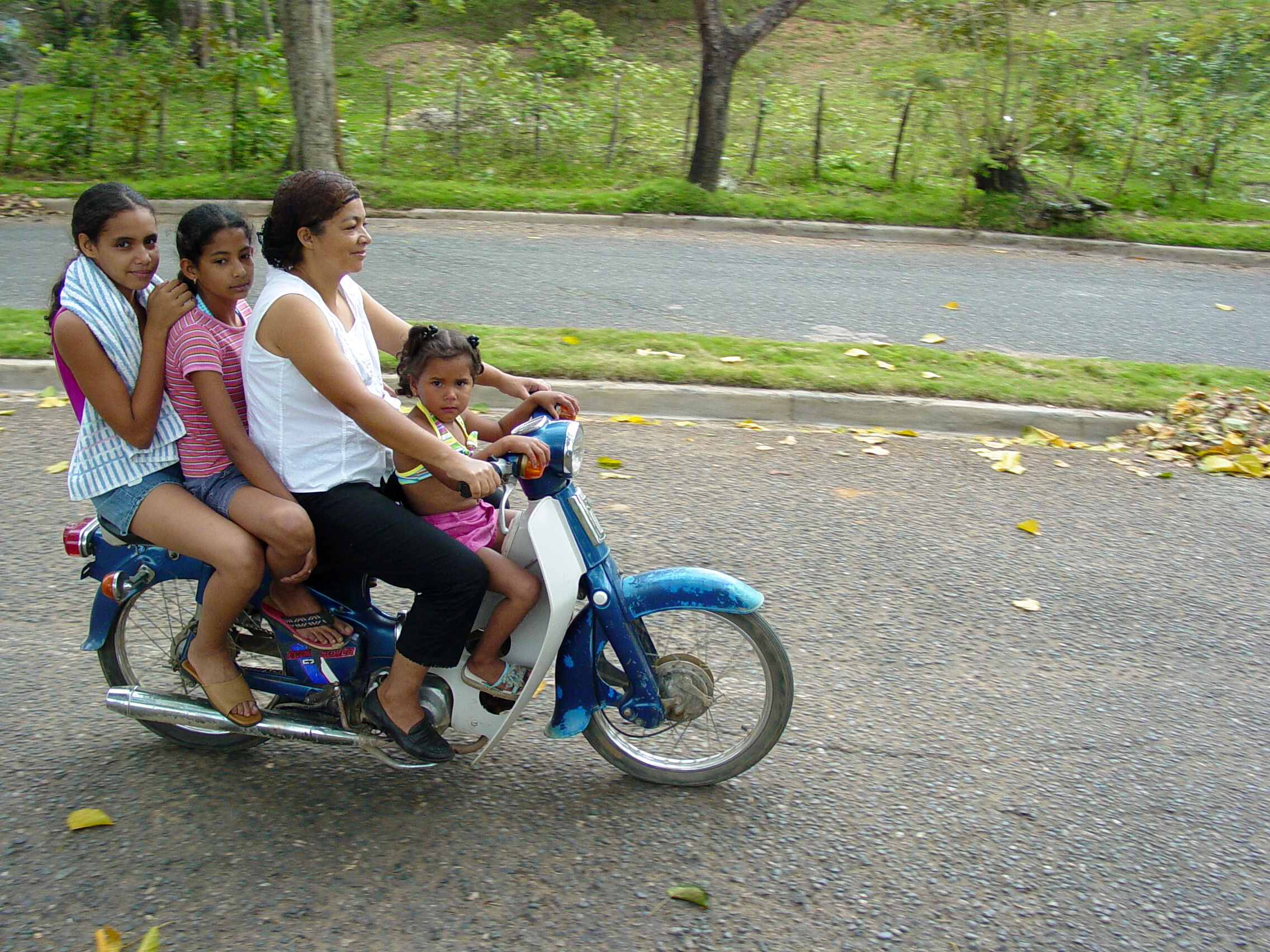
Dominican mother with three daughters rides motorcycle in Jarabacoa.

As of 2019, abortion remains a criminal offence in the Dominican Republic, according to article 37 of the current constitution which enshrines the right to life “from conception to death”. As a result, providers of abortions and women seeking them face criminal sanctions regardless of the health or financial implications to the mother or the circumstances of the impregnation. The Minister of Public Health recognised that unsafe abortions and complications during pregnancy and delivery are major contributors to the maternal mortality rate, and the NGO Women's Link Worldwide reported a rate of one pregnancy-related mortality every two days during the first half of 2017, placing the blame on the dearth of adequate health services.

In December 2014, President Danilo Medina promoted a series of sweeping reforms to the Dominican Republic's penal code, with his contentious proposal to decriminalize abortion in instances of rape, incest and threat to the life of the mother receiving a significant amount of local and international media attention. However, a Constitutional Court decision the following year ruled the reform unconstitutional and reinstituted the total ban on abortions. The decision was widely criticised as a major blow to the progression of women's rights in the country, its impact described by Amnesty International as “catastrophic for women and girls…who will continue to be criminalized, stigmatized and forced to seek out unsafe abortions because they are denied access to safe and legal medical treatment”. Several United Nations committees including the UN Committee against Torture have condemned the decision, accusing the administration of infringing basic rights to life and health and inflicting physical and mental suffering tantamount to torture by denying access to the services.

The treatment of women in the Dominican Republic received further scorn from the international community in August 2017, when the Inter-American Commission on Human Rights received a petition demanding justice for the death of Rosaura Almonte Hernández in 2012. Hernandez, a sixteen year old with leukaemia popularly known as “Esperancita”, was refused access to a therapeutic abortion contrary to numerous medical recommendations and died several days after being denied leukaemia treatment over concerns for the foetus.

=== LGBT rights ===
While the Dominican Criminal Code does not expressly prohibit homosexuality or cross-dressing, it also does not address discrimination or harassment on account of sexual orientation or gender identity, nor does it recognize same sex unions in any form, whether it be marriage or partnerships. Household headed by same-sex couples are also not eligible for any of the same rights given to opposite-sex married couples, as same sex marriage is constitutionally banned in the country.

A majority of Dominicans affiliate with the Catholic Church. As such, attitudes towards members of the LGBT community tend to reflect prevailing Catholic mores. Nevertheless, LGBT people have gained more and more visibility and acceptance in recent years, in line with worldwide trends. Support for same-sex marriage was 25% according to a 2013/2014 opinion poll, but had grown to 45% by 2018. Additionally, the Dominican Republic is legally bound to the January 2018 Inter-American Court of Human Rights ruling, which held that same-sex marriage and the recognition of one's gender identity on official documents are human rights protected by the American Convention on Human Rights.
