= Sonia Pierre =

Human rights advocate from the Dominican Republic

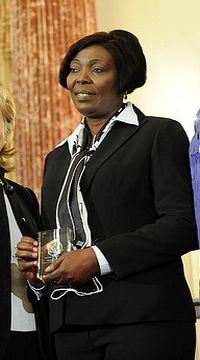
U.S. Secretary of State Hillary Clinton (obscured) and First Lady Michelle Obama (obscured) stand with Honoree Sonia Pierre of the Dominican Republic at the 2010 International Women of Courage Awards at the U.S. Department of State, Washington, D.C., March 10, 2010

Solange Pierre (July 4, 1963 – December 4, 2011), known as Sonia Pierre, was a human rights advocate in the Dominican Republic who worked to end antihaitianismo, which is discrimination against individuals of Haitian origin either born in Haiti or in the Dominican Republic. For this work, she won the 2006 Robert F. Kennedy Human Rights Award.

== Early life ==
Pierre was born in Villa Altagracia, San Cristóbal, Dominican Republic, on July 4, 1963 to parents of Haitian origin (her mother migrated with a temporary work permit in 1957 but overstayed this permit, and her father entered the Dominican territory irregularly). One of twelve children, she was raised in a migrant worker camp called a batey, where many of Haitian descent live. Her birth certificate lists her name as Solain Pie, which Pierre "says is the result of an error by a government clerk." Her nationality was disputed by the Junta Central Electoral on the grounds that her birth certificate is forged, the residence status of her Haitian parents and the lack of evidentiary documentation from Haiti.

At the age of 14, she organized a five-day protest by sugar cane workers on one of the country's bateyes, which led to her being arrested. However, the protest attracted enough public attention that the workers' demands – namely, to have their living quarters painted and be given better tools and pay raises – were met.

== Career ==
Pierre became an activist at the age of 14, when she was arrested for being the spokesperson of a group of Haitian sugar-cane cutters in her migrant labor village who were protesting for better wages and living conditions.

Pierre worked as director of the non-governmental organization Movement for Dominican Women of Haitian Descent (MUDHA), which aims to end antihaitianismo or bias against individuals from Haiti or people of Haitian descent in the Dominican Republic.

In 2005, Pierre petitioned the Inter-American Court of Human Rights on the case of two ethnic Haitian children who were denied Dominican birth certificates. Called Yean and Bosico v. Dominican Republic, the case "upheld human rights laws prohibiting racial discrimination in access to nationality and citizenship." The court also ordered the Dominican government to provide the birth certificates.

However, the Dominican Supreme Court later ruled that Haitian workers using work visas were considered 'in transit' or 'not legally in the country' and that their children were therefore not entitled to citizenship."

== Awards and honors ==
For her work, Pierre won the 2006 Robert F. Kennedy Human Rights Award handed down by former US Senator Ted Kennedy. In presenting the award to Pierre, Kennedy quoted a longtime friend of hers who said: "I am a better person today for having met, worked, and traveled this road with Sonia Pierre. With certitude, I can affirm that Sonia is one of the most selfless, courageous and compassionate human beings of my generation."

Pierre also won Amnesty International's 2003 Human Rights Ginetta Sagan Fund Award, and she and MUDHA were nominated for the UNESCO Prize for Human Rights Education in 2002.

In 2008, she was awarded the Giuseppe Motta Medal for the protection of human rights. She was also honored by the United States Department of State with a 2010 International Women of Courage Award.

== Death ==
On December 4, 2011, Pierre died at the age of 48 from a heart attack while being rushed to the hospital in Villa Altagracia, San Cristóbal, Dominican Republic.

== See also ==
- Juliana Deguis
- Mamá Tingó
