= October 2 massacre =

The October 2 massacre may refer to:

- Parsley massacre, in Dominican Republic, from October 2 to October 8, 1937
- Tlatelolco massacre, in Mexico City, on October 2, 1968
