= Palma Sola massacre =

- Location: Palma Sola, San Juan, Dominican Republic
- Date: 28 December 1962; 63 years ago
- Target: Dominicans
- Attack type: Massacre
- Weapon: Napalm
- Deaths: 600
- Perpetrator: Dominican military

The Palma Sola massacre, also known as the Liborista massacre, was carried out on 28 December 1962 against the Dominicans of the Liborista movement, who lived in Palma Sola, Dominican Republic, burning six hundred people to death by a napalm airstrike.

== Background ==
Olivorio Mateo, known as Papá Liborio, was a religious healer and popular leader of the early twentieth century in the southern region of the country, who created a self-reliant commune in the mountains of San Juan de la Maguana. Born to an impoverished family, he reportedly disappeared during a 1908 hurricane, that swept the south-west region of the country. When his family performed a novena (nine days of prayer for the dead), he suddenly reappeared. Olivorio had claimed that he was transported to heaven and was sent back to earth by God. He was received as an incarnate of Jesus Christ and was worshipped.

Liborio had established a cult in the region, and the idea of fighting for "the salvation of the world and build a different world" based on criteria of equality and solidarity. During the United States occupation of the Dominican Republic, he was branded as a threat and was persecuted and killed.

=== Liborista movement ===
This messianic legacy was collected in 1962 by Romilio and León Ventura Rodriguez, twin brothers and liborista priests, who established a new commune, north of Palma Sola, near Las Matas de Farfán and led a movement that followed the preachings that Olivorio Mateo had reported 40 years earlier.

In addition to the area, general Alcantara Miguel Angel Ramírez, a former exile in Central America, vivified and increased the influence of the twin priests in the inserting area in political activities. The election results strongly favored them with help from influential people in the region, and in political terms, created branches of Palma Sola.

== Events ==
This religious community in Palma Sola who followed the preachings of Olivorio Mateo, was considered a threat to the social economic, and religious status quo. On 26 December 1962, the Dominican government decided to end the mass movement, prompting the dispatch of a military contingent that performed a napalm airstrike killing 600 people in the area. Among those dead was inspector general Miguel Rodríguez Reyes of the Dominican armed forces, who allegedly arrived on the same day to negotiate a treaty and was considered an accidental casualty of the strike.

Some manifestations of this cult still exist in the southern region of the Dominican Republic.

== See also ==
- Parsley Massacre
- History of the Dominican Republic
- List of massacres in the Dominican Republic
- List of massacres in Haiti
