= Racism in the Dominican Republic =

Racism in the Dominican Republic has played a major role in the construction of Dominican government, culture, and identity. Since colonization, the Dominican Republic has negotiated the construction of racial hierarchies. The nation's historically fraught relationship with Haiti informed its Anti-Haitismo. Prejudice during the US occupation embedded racism in the structure of the state. Rafael Trujillo's authoritarian regime leveraged white Dominican identities in anti-black and Anti-Haitian rhetoric. These historical contexts laid the foundation for contemporary struggles with racism.

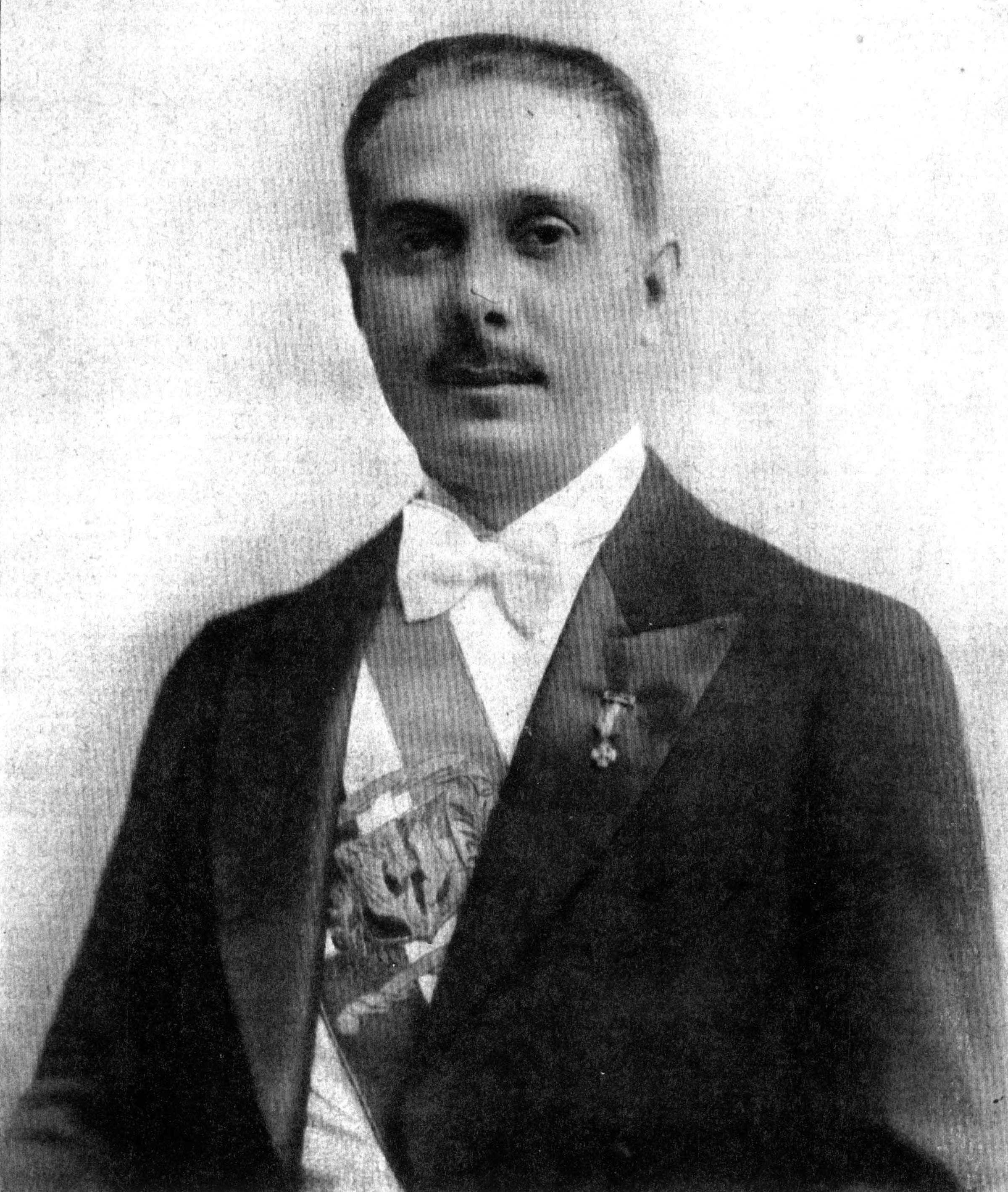
The Dominican dictator Rafael Leónidas Trujillo, who governed between 1930 and 1961, tenaciously promoted an anti-Haitian sentiment and used racial persecution and nationalistic fervor against Haitian migrants.

The contemporary Dominican Republic still contains policy with undertones of structural racism such as the 2013 court ruling which restricted citizenship for those of Haitian descent. The police and far right paramilitary groups such as the AOD also inflict violence on Black communities. A 2013 study concluded that the Dominican Republic was the second most racist country in the Americas. When individuals in the country were asked who they wouldn't want as neighbors, 15-20% responded those of "another race". Still, anti-racist and human rights groups, such as Amnesty International, fight for racial equality through tactics such as memory activism.

== Historical foundations of racism ==
The historical foundations of racism in the Dominican Republic were built through successive periods of occupation that privileged whiteness and institutionalized anti-blackness. These dynamics culminated under the Trujillo regime, which violently weaponized racism as a core tenet of Dominican Identity.

=== Periods of occupation ===
The Dominican Republic's stages of occupation, under Spain, Haiti, and the United States, implemented radicalized hierarchies and set precedents for anti-blackness and Anti-Haitianism.

Spain colonized the island of Hispaniola from 1492 until the 17th century. Under Spanish rule, portions of the indigenous population were wiped out through disease and intentional genocide. The Spanish crown also enslaved indigenous peoples and ruptured existing social orders through the Encomienda system. In 1503, Spain brought enslaved Africans to the island. Once Spain began to extract sugar cane, the amount of enslaved Africans proliferated. The practice of slavery resulted in conflict, including the continent's earliest recorded major slave revolt in Santo Domingo in 1521. Despite the contributions of enslaved Africans to the construction of the Dominican Republic, Dominican elites have since reviled and ignored African ancestries while glorifying European and indigenous contributions.

The western side of Hispaniola, now the country Haiti, became a French colony in 1697. The Haitian Revolution freed Haiti of French rule and by 1822, Haiti's military occupied the entire island, including what is now the Dominican Republic. During this occupation, the Haitian government restricted the use of Spanish, restricted religious festivities, and used violent military repression. During occupation, most of the inhabitants of the East side of the island were of white, Spanish, ancestry. In addition to the repression of Spanish language and culture, the Haitian Constitution banned whites from having property: "12. No whiteman of whatever nation he may be, shall put his foot on this territory with the title of master or proprietor, neither shall he in future acquire any property therein."

This disenfranchisement caused the emigration of white Dominicans. Simultaneously, it cultivated a rejection of blackness in those who stayed. By 1856, The Dominican War of Independence gave the Dominican Republic independence from Haiti but their racially fraught history laid the precedent for Anti-Haitian and Anti-Black rhetoric. By the 20th century, Dominican intellectuals and elites imagined their nationhood as white and Hispanic.

The United States occupation of the Dominican Republic began in 1916 and lasted until 1924. U.S. racial ideologies shaped the Dominican Republic by institutionalizing racism and encouraging the Dominican Republic to code itself as white. During the U.S. occupation racist ideologies became state practice. U.S. officials associated blackness with criminality and disease, and public health laws were applied unevenly. A 1919 sanitary law criminalized prostitution, which disproportionately targeted Black women who, already denied work due to their skin color, had resorted to prostitution. Similarly, Black women found living with U.S. servicemen were deported.

The state institutions created under U.S. occupation, namely the military and police, relied heavily on racist recruitment. In 1921, U.S. officials instructed the constabulary to "lighten" the police force. White, Dominican elites, protested an integrated police force, citing fears of armed Blacks. The anti-blackness of the U.S. occupation was actively documented. In 1921, John Sydney de Bourg, of the Universal Negro Improvement Association (UNIA), wrote that there was "an epidemic of negrophobia raging amongst the U.S. military authorities."

The racial hierarchies built by the U.S. persisted beyond occupation. The U.S. military government served as a blueprint for Rafael Trujillo's authoritarian regime. Under Trujillo, Dominican elites weaponized the whitening ideology of the U.S. and leveraged anti-blackness to consolidate the state.

=== Trujillo Regime ===
Rafael Leónidas Trujillo Molina, a former sugar cane plantation guard who ascended to power in the National Guard, ruled the Dominican Republic from 1930 until his assassination in 1961. Trujillo's authoritarian regime exhibited strict press control, a one-party political structure (the Partido Dominicano), and an extensive persecution of civic liberties.

A notable feature of Trujillo's regime was the invention of a national identity emphasizing hispanidad (i.e., Spanish heritage), Catholicism, and cultural distinction from Haiti. This ideology had its roots in earlier Dominican traditions but was transformed into an official state doctrine under Trujillo. Political elites, affiliated writers, and educators promoted the idea that Dominicans were "white" and "of European origin," thus superior to Haitians who were seen as "African," "dangerous," and "culturally incompatible."

Scholars such as Ernesto Sagás and Richard Lee Turits have shown that antihaitianismo, the national ideology attempting to create a racial hierarchy between Haitians and Dominicans, was institutionalized through education, propaganda, and government policies. State-sponsored figures including but not limited to, Joaquín Balaguer, Tomás Hernández Franco, and Manuel de Jesús Troncoso, portrayed Haitians as a demographic threat, while arguing that the Dominican society was civilized, Catholic, and racially superior.

The Haitian-Dominican border region, where Haitian and Dominican communities historically interconnected, became the primary target of Trujillo's antihaitianismo project. Throughout the early 1930s, the Trujillo regime constructed military posts, tightened documentation requirements, and monitored population movements in northwestern provinces. Such measures were primarily ideological, intended to draw a racial and cultural boundary between Haiti and the Dominican Republic. Trujillo's government promoted mestizo and Black Dominican populations as "Dominicanized" through Spanish cultural heritage, contrasting them with Haitians, who were depicted in government propaganda as culturally "African" and "uncivilized." Such rhetoric linked racial identity to national loyalty, suggesting that Haitian presence within Dominican territory represented a biological and political danger.

At the same time, Trujillo carefully managed his portrayal to the international society. He presented himself as a modernizer and crucial ally of the U.S. under the Good Neighbor Policy. His government initiated publicized infrastructure projects, expanded agrarian settlements, and later invited Jewish World War II refugees to settle in Sosúa to portray the Dominican Republic as humanitarian and racially tolerant. However, these external PR campaigns coexisted with coercive domestic policies and the suppression of Afro-Caribbean identity, highlighted by the Parsley Massacre of 1937.

=== Haitian Massacre (AKA Parsley Massacre) ===
In October 1937, Dominican military forces carried out a coordinated massacre of Haitians and Dominicans of Haitian descent along the border. This event is widely known as the Haitian Massacre or the Parsley Massacre (El Corte). Prior to the massacre, Trujillo delivered a speech in the border town of Dajabón in late September 1937, declaring that the Haitian presence on Dominican soil had become intolerable. Shortly after, Dominican troops (and civilians) began killing individuals who were identified as Haitian. Many targeted Haitians were laborers working in sugar plantations, many of whom had been born in the Dominican Republic and had family members residing in the Dominican Republic.

The killings were concentrated in the northwestern border provinces, primarily along the Dajabón River as soldiers massacred Haitians with rifles, bayonets, clubs, and machetes. The extensive use of machetes were to make the killings appear as spontaneous civilian violence rather than a state-ordered military operation. A well-known method of identification was asking individuals to pronounce the Spanish word for parsley (perejil), as Haitian Kreyòl speakers often pronounced it differently. While the "parsley test" became a symbolic method of identification during the massacre, multiple forms of identification were used, including knowledge of local customs, speech patterns, and physical appearance.

Many Dominican civilians and local authorities also participated in the massacre, many of them assisting soldiers by identifying and locating Haitians, while others helped Haitians hide and flee; recruited civilians included prisoners from other areas of the country or local residents with pre-existing ties with the regime. Local Dominican civilians were coerced to burn and bury the bodies of the victims, playing a role in the growth of antihaitianismo.

Estimates of the death toll vary widely due to the lack of records and denial of the incident even happening within the Dominican Republic. Haitian government sources at the time claimed approximately 12,000 deaths, while Dominican officials denied or downplayed the scale of the massacre. Scholars estimate a death toll from 4,000 to over 20,000, although the scholarly consensus is somewhere between 12,000 and 15,000 deaths over the span of several days.

The massacre triggered international diplomatic tensions, especially with Haiti, Cuba, Mexico, and the United States. The United States, in fear of geopolitical instability, mediated a cash settlement of $750,000 between the Dominican Republic and Haiti rather than condemning the acts of Trujillo and holding him accountable. Despite the fact the Parsley Massacre was driven by ultranationalism and xenophobia, the U.S. tolerated such intentions as the Dominican Republic under Trujillo was an U.S. ally in accordance to the Good Neighbor Policy. Of the initial agreement of $750,000, only $525,000 was ultimately transferred and Haitian families of the victims received only small portions of the compensation. Following the agreement, the Dominican government intensified its border resettlement campaigns, constructing new settlements, military checkpoints, schools, and public works to cement state authority and reduce cross-border migration.

The massacre reshaped racial identities, created enduring fear of state repression among Haitian communities, and reinforced the idea of Dominican national identity as being of European origin contrary to Haiti, which was of Afro-origin. Later nationalistic policies, such as the 2013 Constitutional Court ruling, demonstrate the longlasting effects of the institutional and ideological frameworks established during the Trujillo era.

== Contemporary race relations ==
Even in the present day, it is still found that racial identity is bridged to national boundaries. Dominicans define "Dominican" in opposition to "Haitian," thus demonstrating the rhetoric, which prevails throughout the Dominican Republic, that physical appearance links to national belonging. Trujillo's regime still has a long lasting influence on Dominican nationalism today.

People of predominant European ancestry in the Dominican Republic have an economic and social privilege, and have strong representation in politics, business and the media, while those of African ancestry are in the lowest strata of society. The mixed-race population identify as "Mestizo" or "Indio" rather than Mulatto, preferring to acknowledge only their European and Native heritage, while those with darker skin and other traits associated with 'Blackness' face rejection and social exclusion. Thus, in the country whiteness is often associated with wealth, intelligence, beauty, and cleanliness, while blackness is associated with poverty, lower education, and unattractive features.

The Dominican Republic often socially denied people of African descent, due to the long lasting legacy of European colonialism, and the anti-black sentiment that the nation adopted and institutionalized after its independence.

In Latin America, there is more flexibility in how people racially categorize themselves: they identify themselves mostly based on skin color and facial features and not so much their ancestry, allowing for more "racial fluidity." For example, a person who has some degree of Black ancestry can identify as non-Black if they can 'pass' as such. The Dominican Republic had established the rhetoric that the Dominican Republic was a white nation.

Contemporary incidents of discrimination include the 2013 Court ruling, and the earthquake that impacted Haiti in 2010, which then led to the Dominican government revoking the citizenship birth from the Constitution, affecting hundreds of thousands of Haitians in the Dominican Republic at the time. The Court's decisions reflect long-standing racialized exclusion and argue that these racial boundaries are derived from nationalism and fears of "Haitinization."

Anti-Haitian policies are common in the Dominican Republic, as mass deportations and police raids continue among dark skinned communities. The government deports thousands of people weekly, a practice that garners criticism from the United Nations, who accuse the Dominican Republic of violating humanitarian rights.

The present environment of the Dominican Republic is surrounded by fear. Many Dominicans of Haitian descent avoid hospitals, work, and schools out of fear of being deported to Haiti. Racial discrimination in the Dominican Republic is prevalent and continuous, as activists continue to fight for equal rights.

=== Race and state policy ===
Scholars note that Dominican state policy since the Trujillo regime has continued continue to affect Haitian migrants, despite Haitian labour playing a substantial role in sects of the Dominican economy, such as the sugar industry. Scholars describe Dominican work conditions for Haitians on sugar plantations as "a modern form of slavery". Scholars additionally suggest that public perception of the state's treatment of Haitian migrants is perceived not as a social issue but rather an attempt to uphold internal differences between the two groups.

In 2006, a meeting between Dominican and Haitian representatives (mostly policy makers and academics) took place in order to discuss potential economic cooperation. However, the meeting became contentious regarding Haitian migration into the Dominican Republic. The meeting received national attention, contributing to the renewed debate that Haitian labour negatively impacted, instead of upheld, the Dominican economy. As a result, Haitian deportations by the state become more publicly supported. This meeting, along with the decline of the sugar industry and the increase in large-scale deportations starting the 1990s, was associated with a shift in government policy that reduced and stigmatized Haitian labour in the Dominican Republic.

In September 2013, the Constitutional Tribunal of the Dominican Republic stripped Dominicans of Haitian descent of their citizenship. Estimates suggests that about 210,000 individuals were stripped of their Dominican citizenship, greatly increasing their risk of deportation.

In 2022, the Dominican government ratified Decree 668-22, a provision that expanded enforcement operations and allowed for the expulsion of undocumented Dominicans of Haitian origin. Several experts see the provision as the continuation of an exclusionary legal regime enacted by the Dominican government going back decades. A 2024 study found anti-Haitian policies to be an essential component of many political candidate's campaigns. The same study found that anti-Haitian and anti-migration groups were able to mobilize more effectively than opposition movements.

In April 2024, Amnesty International sent an open letter to Luis Abinader, the President of the Dominican Republic, calling for "an end to human rights violations against Haitians, Dominicans of Haitian descent and Black people." The organization further demanded that the Dominican "restore legal channels of entry and stay for workers, students, family members, asylum seekers and migrants seeking legal residence in the country." Abinader rejected the open letter, stating that the Dominican would continue to enforce its immigration laws and that the organization "had no moral authority" to question the country's policies.

Today, many Dominican citizens are frequently reported being denied national identity cards. Migrants or descendants of Haitian origin living in the Dominican Republic cite the lack of legal documentation as a major challenge in daily life. Even for Haitian migrants or Dominicans of Haitian origin with proper documentation, officials have been reported to confiscate and resell documents.

=== Race and violence ===
Scholars link racial violence in the Dominican Republic to historical prejudice from the Trujillo regime, along with labour and economic exploitation by the state. Dominicans often label Haitian people as "black" in comparison to Dominicans, which scholars argue is used to create a social and political divide between the two countries. Racial violence in the Dominican Republic has been reported by both state actors and civilians.

Every government since Trujillo has regularly rounded up and deported thousands of Haitian migrants from the Dominican Republic, according to the Human Rights Watch. According to Richard Lee Turits, author of the Haitian Massacre review, migrants have been subjected to extraordinary exploitation and continual human rights abuses. Studies show that Dominicans often rationalize violence against Haitian migrants as an effort to defend pre-determined racial boundaries, not as an ongoing act of discrimination.

At the turn of the century, there was a steady growth of violent attacks against those "perceived to be Haitian". During this time, around 12,000 people "suspected of being Haitian" were deported each year. Only thirteen instances of Dominican violence towards Haitians were reported to the media.

In 2006, 21 homes in the Haitian majority hamlet of Fao were burnt to the ground in retaliation for the death of a Dominican soldier. In 2015, a young Haitian man was lynched in Santiago. The lynching sparked protests in Haiti, the Dominican Republic, and the United States over Anti-Haitian sentiment in the Dominican Republic.

Paramilitary groups, such as the AOD, have additionally called for the violent removal of all Haitians living in the Dominican Republic. Modern paramilitary groups gain public traction largely on social media, inciting violence that develops in the real world. Since the 2013 Constitutional Court decision, organized modes of intimidation and violence from paramilitary groups has continued. Human rights groups dedicated to protecting Haitian migrants, such as MONDHA, MUDHA, and MOSCTHA, have experienced online attacks such as slurs and death threats.

=== Anti-racism ===
Anti-racism initiatives have made headway in the Dominican-Republic. Historical memorials, grassroots campaigns, and human rights advocates have addressed the racist rhetoric towards Haitians and Afro-Dominicans.

Human rights organizations, such as Amnesty International, have drawn together resources to bring attention to discrimination that activists face who advocate for equal rights of Haitians and Afro-Dominicans. Amnesty International had urged Dominican authorities to protect protestors on the International Day for the Elimination of Racial Discrimination, and that without protection the result could be "physical violence and permanent silencing of a part of Dominican civil society." Groups similar to Amnesty International that advocate against racism, criticize the government and seek change in the policies that portray activists as a threat to the nation.

Scholarly research highlights that the Dominican government portrays protests against racism as undermining the national identity rhetoric that is defined by blanqueamiento (whiteness) and Hispanic backgrounds. Racial boundaries deny "Black heritage and differentiate Dominican identity from Haitian identity." Additionally, scholars defend that the assembly of anti-discrimination activists will "challenge the rhetoric of descent" that it used to define nationalism within the Dominican-Republic, while also highlighting African heritage.

Edward Paulino notes the strategy of memory activism, in which he started the Border of Lights, a group that holds vigils as well as educational events, at the border of the Dominican Republic and Haiti, to honor those who lost their lives in the Parsley Massacre. The Dominican-Republic fails to recognize the massacre or hold any remembrance for those who lost their lives. Therefore, activist groups such as the Border of Lights, hope to "reshape collective memory" to accentuate the lost lives of Haitians and Afro-Dominicans from the massacre.

Activists continue to fight against the displacement of Dominican born individuals of Haitian descent, as established by the 2013 Constitutional Court case. Many groups have conducted campaigns and filed legal challenges with global human-rights institutions to defend the rights and families of Dominican-born individuals who are of Haitian descent.

Despite the activist mobilization, there is still backlash from political figures and nationalist agendas that perceive these racial movements as being led by foreign influence and a threat to the nation. Advocates in the Dominican-Republic hope to gain protection in fighting against racism to progress forwards in their social movement of gaining equality and addressing the racism that is built within the structure of the Dominican government.
