= José del Castillo Saviñón =

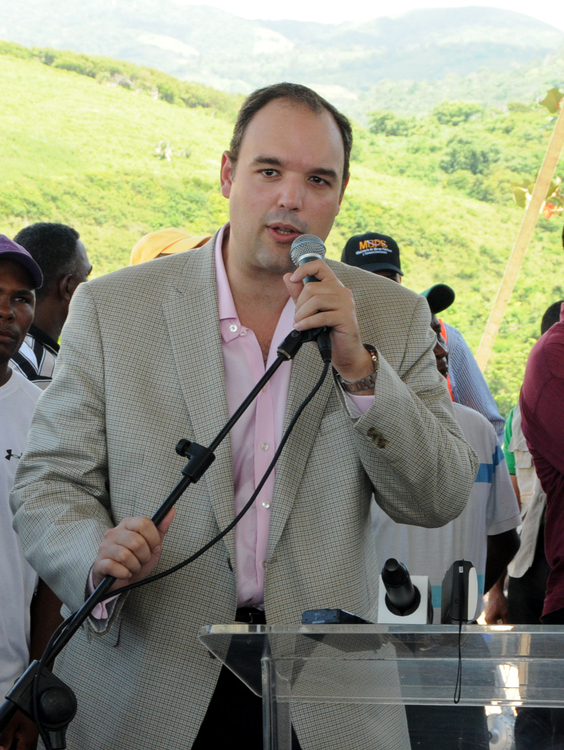

Minister of Industry and Commerce
- Incumbent
- Assumed office 16 August 2012
- Prime Minister: Danilo Medina
- Preceded by: Manuel García Arévalo

Viceminister of Industry and Commerce
- In office 4 March 2011 – 16 August 2012
- Prime Minister: Leonel Fernández

Personal details
- Born: José Manuel del Castillo Saviñón; 1 March 1975 (age 51) Santo Domingo, Dominican Republic
- Party: Partido de la Liberación Dominicana
- Education: Pontificia Universidad Católica Madre y Maestra

José Manuel del Castillo Saviñón (born 1 March 1975) is a Dominican lawyer, business and politician. He is known to have been the former Minister of Industry and Commerce of the Dominican Republic during the first government of Danilo Medina.

== Personal life ==
José Manuel del Castillo Saviñón was born in Santo Domingo, Dominican Republic, on 1 March 1975. He is the elder son of the sociologist, historian, intellectual and former director of the "Museum of Dominican Man", José del Castillo Pichardo, and the scientist Hilda Saviñón Guerra.

He completed his primary education at the "Colegio Dominicano de la Salle", graduating as a Bachelor of Science and Letters. in 1992. He immediately started to study Legal Science at the Pontificia Universidad Católica Madre y Maestra, graduating in 1996, and later enrolling for a master's degree in Economic Law and Business Law.

In 1996 he produced his thesis, "The Dominican Republic at the World Trade Organization". Soon after, the government sought his advice on industry and trade. In 2003 he succeeded Servio Tulio Castaños as Legal Consultant to the Senate of the Dominican Republic and later was a consultant to the Committee on Industry and Trade of the Dominican Senate.

He has developed most of his professional life in the private sector as president of his own consulting firm "Gabinete Economico, S. A", providing legal and business advice for more than 12 years to various prestigious national and international companies.

Del Castillo has also hosted various television programs of business and economy, such as "Economía al Día", "Mundo económico (sección del programa Metrópolis)", "La Revista Económica", "Gabinete Económico" and "Economía y Negocios".

== Political life ==
Del Castillo began work in the political projecto of the then-presidential secretary of state Danilo Medina in 2006, through his friend Gonzalo Castillo. He later worked as Financial Coordinator of the Campaign of Danilo Medina and also became his official representative in the southwest area of the country through the "External Sector with Danilo".

On 15 March 2011 then-President Leonel Fernández, with Manuel Garcia Arevalo, offers him to be as Viceminister of Industry and Commerce in the area of Hydrocarbons and Mining, a position he held until 16 August 2012, when he was appointed as Minister of Industry and Trade by president Danilo Medina.

In his work as Minister for Industry and Commerce, Del Castillo emphasized the roles of small and medium enterprises, mining, natural gas and non-conventional energy.

In 2016 the president Medina appointed Del Castillo as President of the board of directors of Dominican Institute of Telecommunications (INDOTEL) until February 2018. Since then he has not held any position in the public administration.

=== Barahona ===
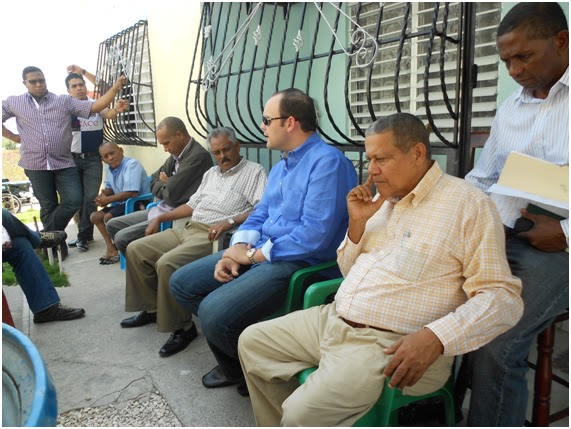
José del Castillo Saviñón (center) with leaders of the PLD in 2013.

Jose del Castillo has continued to work actively in Barahona, devoting spare time to helping the inhabitants of that province through his Foundation "Jose del Castillo Saviñón". Jose del Castillo has resided in the province for several years, and there are rumors he wants to become a candidate for Senator of the province of Barahona in the 2016 elections.
