= 2013 Dominican Republic–Haiti diplomatic crisis =

The Dominican Republic (DR) and Haiti experienced a diplomatic crisis in 2013. The principal point of conflict was an issue of trade restrictions, but it unfolded against the background of the DR's attempt to return thousands of DR residents of Haitian descent to Haiti. More than 3,000 Haitians had been expelled from the DR in the first half of the year.

On June 6, 2013, Haiti imposed a ban on the importation of chickens and eggs from the DR, citing indications that there was an outbreak of bird flu there. DR officials said other types of flu but not bird flu had been identified. On June 10, the Pan American Health Organization stated that no cases of bird flu had been found in the DR.

On June 12, the President of the Dominican Republic, Danilo Medina, sent a committee led by the Secretary of Industry and Commerce, José Del Castillo Saviñón, to Port-au-Prince to resolve the dispute.

A meeting between Haitian Foreign Minister Pierre-Richard Casimir and Dominican Foreign Minister Carlos Morales on June 17 produced no resolution.

The DR ships 30 million eggs and 1.5 million chickens to Haiti monthly. By June 19, activity at the four border crossings between the two countries had come to a standstill. Medina announced that the DR would work to identify new markets and grow those already established in Puerto Rico and Venezuela. The head of the Dominican Association of Egg Producers said that thousands of poultry farm workers, who he identified as Haitians, would have to be fired. Casimir said Haiti wanted to find a way to reopen trade, while Medina said he could not wait and would have to take "drastic measures".

Presidents Michel Martelly of Haiti and Medina of the DR discussed their differences on 30 June during a meeting of the Petrocaribe oil alliance nations in Nicaragua. Medina said that Martelly admitted there were no problems with the quality of eggs and chickens from the Dominican Republic and that the ban had been imposed as a matter of economic policy based on Haiti's difficulty in collecting tax revenues associated with the imports. The import ban remained in place.

On July 19, the Haitian government prohibited the importation of plastics from the Dominican Republic, arguing that they were not of good quality and that Haiti needed to reduce pollution caused by plastic.

On September 23, 2013, the Dominican Republic Constitutional Court ruled that children born to non-citizens in the Dominican Republic after 1929 are not and have never been citizens of the Dominican Republic. Since 2010 the DR constitution has denied citizenship to any non-citizen born "in transit", but the court extended that language to cover any undocumented person resident in the DR and their descendants. The ruling affects 458,233 Haitian workers living in the Dominican Republic and it can leave more than 200,000 people stateless. One analysis reported that the court decision created the fifth largest groups of stateless people in the world. A group of writers who protested the ruling compared its impact to apartheid and said it represented "the reinstating of the old racism that many have fought against". They described its impact:

Dominicans born after 1929 to parents who are not of Dominican ancestry are to have their citizenship revoked. The ruling affects an estimated 250,000 Dominican people of Haitian descent, including many who have had no personal connection with Haiti for several generations.

The government of the DR said the decision would allow for the proper documentation of non-citizens and allow the government to establish clearly their means of becoming legal residents of the DR. Advocates for the stateless criticized the DR's procedures as inadequate and ill-suited to an impoverished rural population that lacked the required birth registration records.

On October 1, Haiti recalled its ambassador from the Dominican Republic.

The Dominican government's acceptance of implementation of the court ruling was harshly criticized by NGO human rights offices, by 15 countries in the Caribbean Community (Caricom) and by the United Nations. Amnesty International said the DR had "effectively wiped four generations of Dominicans off the map".
