= Anti-Haitian sentiment in the Dominican Republic =

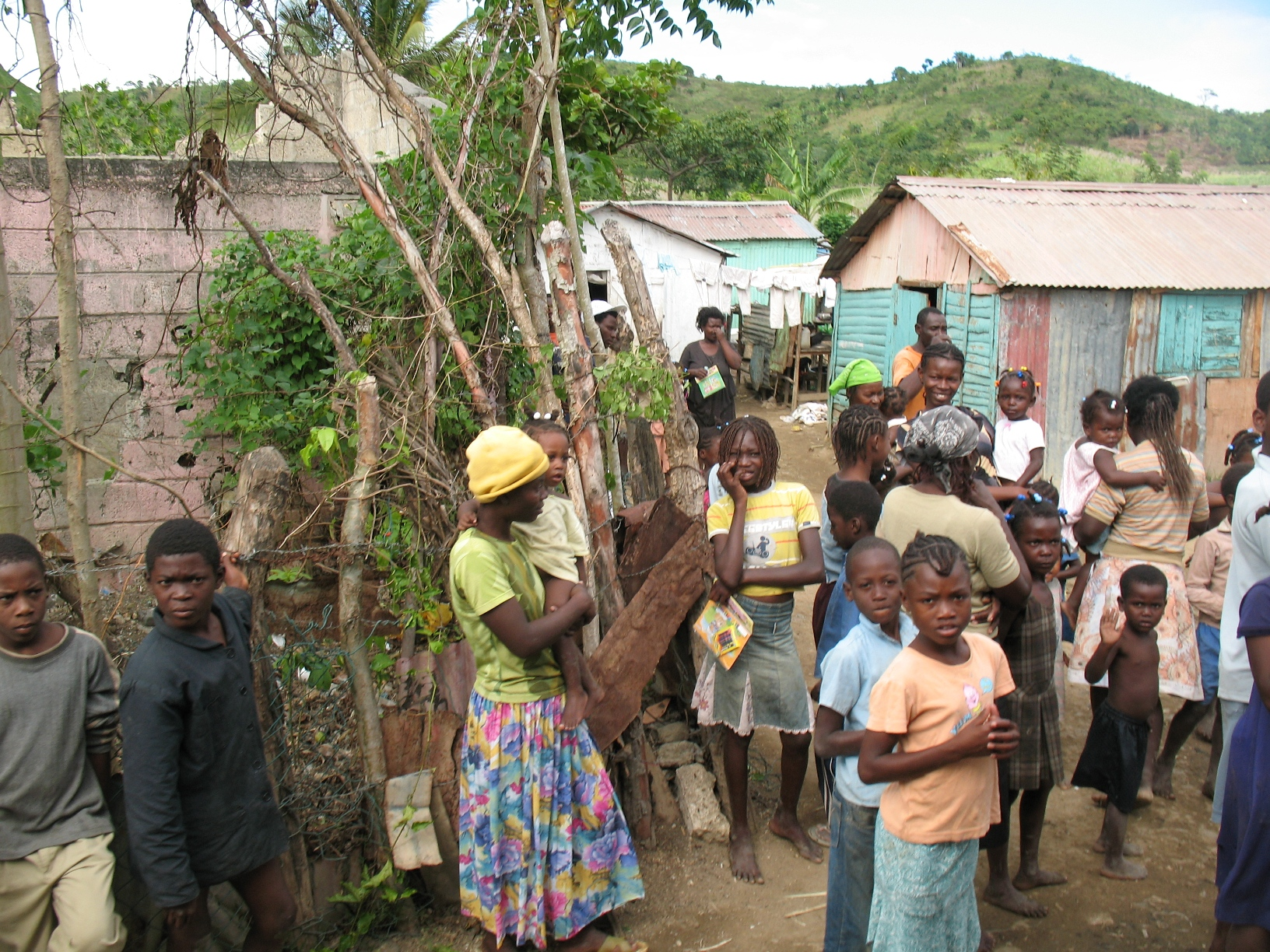
Haitians in a rural village of the Dominican Republic

Anti-Haitian sentiment (French: Anti-haïtianisme, Spanish: Antihaitianismo) is prejudice, social discrimination, or negative attitudes towards Haitians in the Dominican Republic.

Anti-Haitian sentiment or anti-Haitianism includes prejudice against, hatred of, or discrimination against Haitians due to their ethnicity, culture, lifestyle, or language. It is intimately tied with anti-Blackness and classism, due to the ethnic makeup and status of Haiti.

== Anti-Haitian sentiment in the Dominican Republic ==
=== Origins: 16th century through 19th century ===
Human Rights Watch has stated in their reports that the differences between Haitians and Dominicans can be based on colonial times from linguistic, cultural, and racial differences. For instance, the Dominican Republic was governed by the Spanish, and thus acquired part of their culture from the Spanish, mixed with Africans and Native Americans. Haiti was governed by the French, and its culture is a mixture of French, African and Native American. The majority of Haiti's population is descended from African slaves, while Dominicans possess a multiracial mix of Spanish, African and Indigenous ancestry.

Anti-Haitian sentiment can be traced back to a policy of racial segregation instituted by the Spaniards in the Captaincy General of Santo Domingo, present-day Dominican Republic. Prior to the arrival of Europeans, the island was divided among Taíno chiefdoms: three located in the area of the modern-day Dominican Republic and two in the area of modern-day Haiti, with Haiti encompassing some territory that is now part of the Dominican Republic). Carib people from islands further south were often at war with the Taíno people.

Columbus reached the island in 1492. Slaves imported from Africa arrived from 1503 onwards—many natives were also soon enslaved, Within a few decades the Spanish controlled most of the island. During the 17th century, the French also began maneuvering for control, and in 1697 acquired the western portion, now part of Haiti. The Spanish portion encompassed the modern Dominican Republic. In 1795, with the Peace of Basel Spain ceded the eastern two thirds of the island in exchange for Gipuzkoa.

French control did not last after the Haitian Revolution and the Spanish reconquest of Santo Domingo. In 1821, the Republic of Spanish Haiti proclaimed its independence to be shortly afterwards be taken by the western Haitian forces from 1822 to 1844. In 1844, the secret revolutionary movement called "La Trinitaria" took place and the Dominican Republic declared its independence, defeating the Haitian forces.

In the 1860s, after several tumultuous decades, the Spanish briefly acquired nominal control of the Dominican Republic , setting off another war. By the late 19th century, over three hundred years of European control was ended. The modern history of west Hispaniola (Haiti) and east Hispaniola (Dominican Republic) had begun.

=== Under Trujillo: 1930s and 1940s ===
Anti-Haitian sentiment was strongly institutionalized during the regime of Rafael Leónidas Trujillo. Border disputes under Trujillo culminated in the order of a military intervention and to massacre Haitians accused of practicing vodou or witchery, practices that were against the popular Roman Catholic beliefs in the Dominican Republic at the time. Thousands killed is the minimum scholarly consensus, and some academic sources push the estimate as high as 40,000 for the October 1937 event subsequently named the Parsley Massacre.

The Army killed about 10,000 to 15,000 Haitians over six days, from the night of 2 October 1937, to 8 October 1937. To avoid leaving evidence of the Army's involvement, the soldiers used machetes instead of bullets. The soldiers of Trujillo interrogated anyone with dark skin, using the shibboleth "parsley" to differentiate Afro-Haitians from Afro-Dominicans when necessary, the "r" of parsley was difficult pronunciation for Haitians. During later diplomacy, Trujillo agreed to pay hundreds of thousands in reparations, but somewhat less was actually delivered.

Due to corrupt Haitian bureaucrats, exceedingly little reached the families. Dominican intellectuals Manuel Arturo Peña Batlle, Joaquín Balaguer, Manuel de Jesús Troncoso de la Concha, among others, led the campaign.

The 1937 massacre legitimized subsequent state acts of violence against the Haitian-origin population in the Dominican Republic. Each successive government since has forcibly removed thousands of Haitians and Haitian-Dominicans in routine round-ups and expulsions by the military.

=== Present day: 1990s–2020s ===
Trujillo's policies served to perpetuate anti-Haitian sentiment within the Dominican Republic. In the 1996 Dominican presidential election, Joaquín Balaguer, historical leader of the populist right and former right-hand of dictator Trujillo, united in a "National Patriotic Front" with PLD candidate Leonel Fernández in order to prevent José Francisco Peña Gómez, who was adopted as an infant by a Dominican family but born to Haitian parents, from becoming president.

In 2014, the Dominican Republic ended jus soli birthright citizenship, revoking Dominican citizenship from anyone "born to undocumented parents between 1929 and 2007." This decision left hundreds of thousands of Dominicans of Haitian descent stateless. After this ruling, Dominicans of Haitian ancestry began to be deported to Haiti. Human Rights Watch has said that this change has resulted in "violations of the human right to a nationality."

In the 2020s, the Dominican Republic, under the rule of President Luis Abinader, has ramped up deportations of Haitians and Dominicans of Haitian descent. The General Directorate of Migration claimed to have deported over 34,000 Haitians in May of 2025, the most ever deported in a single month up until that point. Abinader's government has received backlash from human rights groups for the deportation plan, with Amnesty International calling it "racist", and saying it posed a risk for "human rights violations". NYU Law School's Global Justice Clinic has described the deportation campaign as a human rights violation.

In November 2025, an 11-year old Haitian-Dominican girl, Stephora Joseph, died of drowning on a school trip in Santiago. The unclear circumstances of her death and claims by her mother alleging that she was bullied for being Haitian by her classmates have resulted in outrage among Haitians and Dominicans alike, as well as speculation that her death may have been the result of negligence by the school or the actions of her classmates. Some Dominican journalists claimed that she was held underwater by boys in her class, and others have said she was targeted for being Haitian.

Anti-Haitian sentiment was used to attack Dominican-American politician Darializa Avila Chevalier during her campaign against fellow Dominican-American Adriano Espaillat in the Democratic Party primary in New York's 13th congressional district in 2026. During the campaign, Avila Chevalier was the target of racism animated by anti-Haitian sentiment. Some Espaillat supporters falsely claimed she was Haitian, questioned her fidelity to the Dominican community in New York City, and called her "Haitian" as a slur. City & State reported that a senior adviser to Espaillat, Rusking Pimentel, made racist and Islamophobic comments about Avila Chevalier, who is a convert to Islam, in Spanish-language media. Espaillat disavowed the comments and told his supporters not to question Avila Chevalier’s heritage, asserting "she's Dominican”. Avila Chevalier defeated Espaillat narrowly.

== See also ==
- Racism in the Dominican Republic
- Racial segregation
- Sonia Pierre
- Haitian Revolution
- Treaty of Paris (1814)
- Code Noir
