= Parsley massacre =

1937 mass killing of Haitians by Dominican forces

- Location: 19.631°N 70.290°W; Dominican Republic
- Date: 2 October 1937 – 8 October 1937
- Target: Haitians in the Dominican Republic
- Attack type: Genocidal massacre
- Weapons: Krag rifles, machetes and bayonets
- Deaths: 17,000–35,000
- Injuries: 2,419
- Victim: Potentially up to 23%-60% of the Haitian population of the Dominican Republic killed
- Perpetrator: Dominican Army under the orders of Rafael Trujillo
- Motive: Anti-black racism Antihaitianismo

The Parsley massacre (Spanish: Masacre del Perejil; French: Massacre du Persil; Haitian Creole: Masak nan Pèsil), often colloquially called the Cutting (Spanish: el corte; Haitian Creole: kout kouto-a), was a mass killing of Haitians living in settlements and occupied land in the Dominican Republic's northwestern frontier and in certain parts of the contiguous Cibao region in October 1937. Dominican Army troops from different areas of the country carried out the massacre on the orders of Dominican dictator Rafael Trujillo.

As a result of the massacre, virtually the entire Haitian population in the Dominican frontier was either killed or forced to flee across the border. Many died while trying to flee to Haiti across the Dajabón River that divides the two countries on the island; the troops followed them into the river to cut them down, causing the river to run with blood and corpses for several days. The massacre claimed the lives of an estimated 14,000 to 40,000 Haitian men, women, and children, out of 60,517 "foreign" members of the black population in 1935 meaning one to three fifths of the Haitian population of the country or more may have been killed in the massacre.

While death count estimates vary widely, scholars generally agree on an estimated 20,000 deaths. The exact number of victims is impossible to calculate for several reasons. The Dominican Army carried out most of the killings in isolated areas, often leaving no witnesses or few survivors. Many bodies were either disposed of in the sea, where they were consumed by sharks, or buried in mass graves, where acidic soil degraded them, leaving nothing for forensic investigators to exhume.

The name of the massacre comes from reports that Dominican troops interrogated thousands of civilians demanding that each victim say the Spanish word perejil ("parsley") as a shibboleth. The pronunciation test is referred to as the parsley test. According to the stories, if the accused could not pronounce the word to the interrogators' satisfaction, meaning with the Dominican accent and pronunciation, they were deemed to be Haitians and killed. However, most scholars recognize that the use of the parsley test specifically may be a misconception, as research by historian Lauren Derby shows, the explanation is based more on myth than on personal accounts.

== Background ==
By the 1930s, the Dominican Republic had a significant population of Haitians that could be divided into two main groups consisting of braceros, agricultural workers, and more permanent communities of Haitian-descended families in the North and West. The braceros were seasonal migrant laborers working on sugar plantations in the south and east. The Dominican government regulated their migration for the benefit of the sugar companies, while the more firmly established groups included families of workers, smallholders, and entrepreneurs. Many of the latter were Dominican-born but retained Haitian cultural and ethnic identity, creating a bicultural identity in the border region that clashed with Trujillo’s nationalist ideals.

Less than a month before the massacre began, Trujillo imposed a quota on the percentage of non-Dominican sugar workers that an estate could employ and deported Haitians who could not produce papers establishing their place of birth and nationality. As a follow-up to his effort to expel black Haitians from the frontier, Trujillo attempted to recruit white immigrants from Puerto Rico.

As a strong proponent of anti-Haitianism, Trujillo made his intentions towards the Haitian community clear in a short speech he gave on October 2nd 1937 during a celebration in his honor in the province of Dajabón.

For some months, I have traveled and traversed the border in every sense of the word. I have seen, investigated, and inquired about the needs of the population. To the Dominicans who were complaining of the depredations by Haitians living among them, thefts of cattle, provisions, fruits, etc., and were thus prevented from enjoying in peace the products of their labor, I have responded, 'I will fix this.' And we have already begun to remedy the situation. Three hundred Haitians are now dead in Bánica. This remedy will continue.

Trujillo reportedly acted in response to reports of Haitians stealing cattle and crops from Dominican borderland residents. Trujillo commanded his army to kill all Haitians living in the Dominican Republic's northwestern frontier and in certain parts of the contiguous Cibao region.

== Contributing factors ==
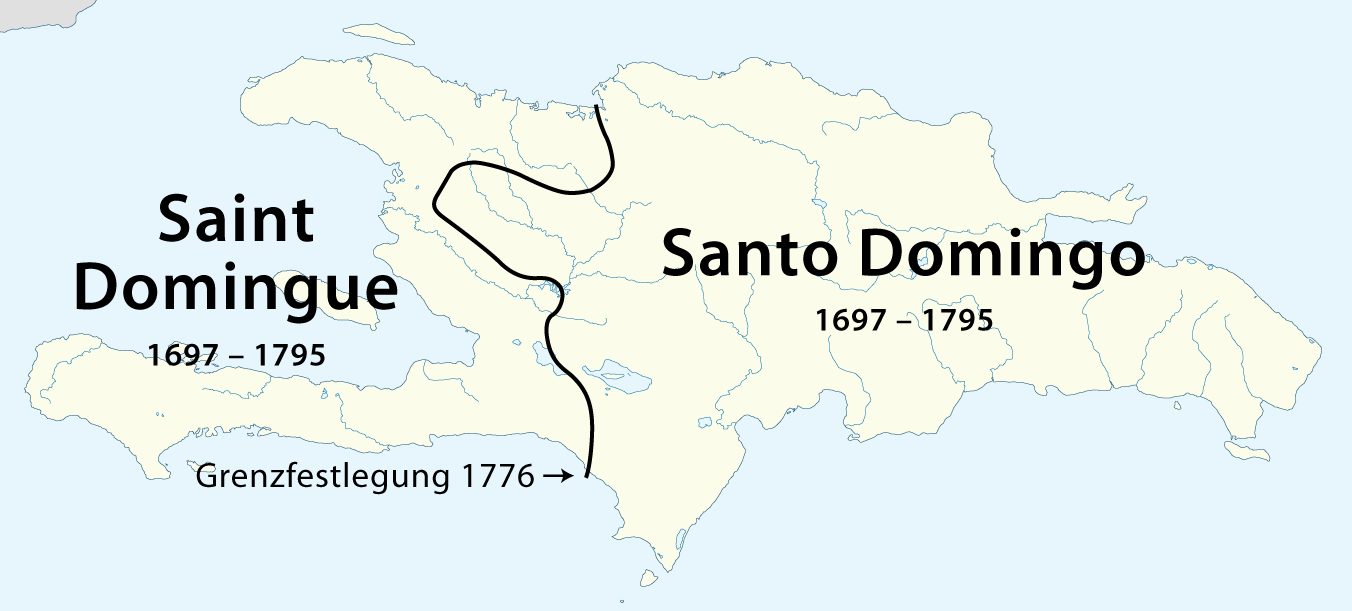
The French colony of Saint-Domingue (later Haiti) in the Western coast, and the Spanish colony of Santo Domingo (later the Dominican Republic) in the rest of Hispaniola island. The border has moved a number of times in history.

Haitian-Dominican relations have long been strained by territorial disputes and competition for the resources of Hispaniola. Between the years of 1910–1930, there was an extensive migration of Haitians to their neighboring countries of the Dominican Republic and Cuba in search of work. The exact number of Haitian migration to the Dominican Republic is not readily available but it is more than the estimated 200,000 that emigrated to Cuba. Among several authors, the Haiti-Dominican Republic migration corridor is considered far more important than the Haiti-Cuba migration due to geographic proximity. The large influx of Haitians to the Dominican Republic further divided the complicated relationship between the two states.

The Dominican Republic, formerly the Spanish colony of Santo Domingo, is the eastern portion of the island of Hispaniola and it occupies five-eighths of the land with a population of ten million inhabitants. In contrast, Haiti, the former French colony of Saint-Domingue, is on the western three-eighths of the island and has almost exactly the same population, with an estimated 200 people per square kilometre.

Due to inadequate roadways which connect the borderlands to major cities, "Communication with Dominican markets was so limited that the small commercial surplus of the frontier slowly moved toward Haiti."

Furthermore, the Dominican government saw the loose borderlands as a liability in terms of possible formation of revolutionary groups that could flee across the border with ease, while at the same time amassing weapons and followers.

Despite Trujillo's own mixed race identity, he projected the image of the Dominican Republic as a White, Hispanic society. More so, although he emphasized the historic Dominican prejudice against Black Haitians, Trujillo himself had a Haitian grandparent. He advocated the “deafricanization” of the Dominican Republic and the restoration of “traditional Catholic values.”

== Massacre ==
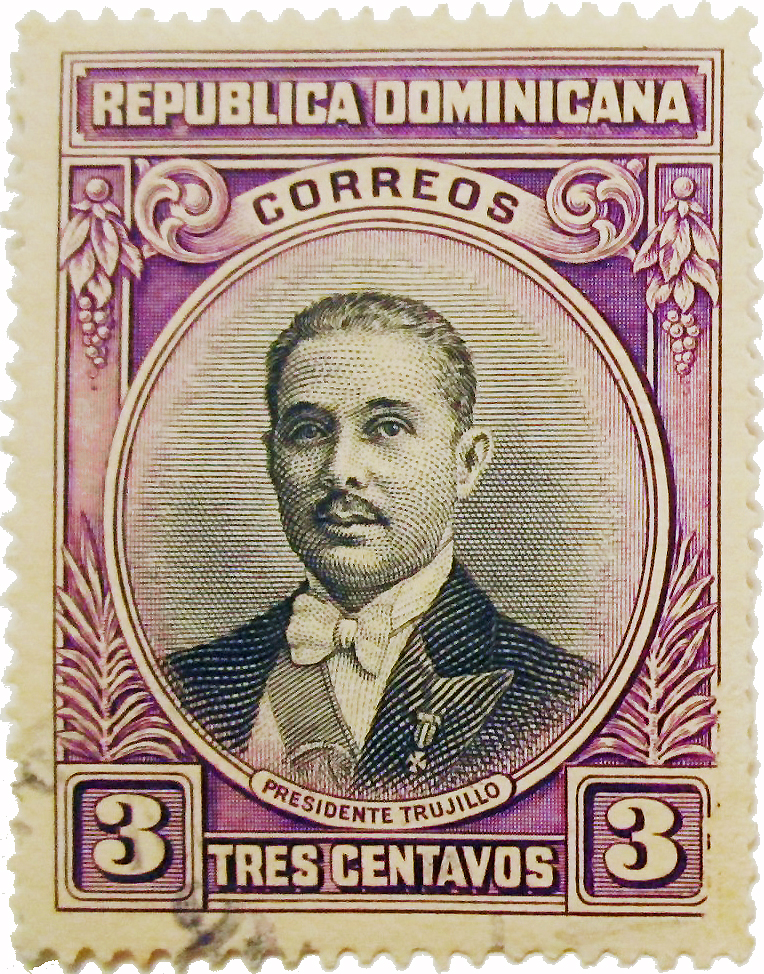
Rafael Trujillo on a 1930s stamp

Between October 2nd and October 8th, hundreds of Dominican troops, who came mostly from other areas of the country, poured into the Cibao, and used rifles, machetes, shovels, knives, and bayonets to kill Haitians. Haitian babies were reportedly thrown in the air and caught by soldiers' bayonets, then thrown on their mothers' corpses.

Dominican troops beheaded thousands of Haitians, and took others to the port of Montecristi, where they were thrown into the Atlantic Ocean to drown with their hands and feet bound, some with wounds inflicted by the soldiers in order to attract sharks. Survivors who managed to cross the border and return to Haiti told stories of family members being hacked with machetes and strangled by the soldiers, and children bashed against rocks and tree trunks.

The use of military units from outside the region was not always enough to expedite soldiers' killings of Haitians. US legation informants reported that many soldiers "confessed that in order to perform such ghastly slaughter they had to get 'blind' drunk." Several months later, a barrage of killings and repatriations of Haitians occurred in the southern frontier.

Historian Lauren Derby, who has researched this period extensively and published widely on the topic, claims that a majority of those who died were born in the Dominican Republic and belonged to well-established Haitian communities in the borderlands.

== Aftermath ==
At first the Haitian president, Sténio Vincent, prohibited any discussion of the massacre and issued a statement on 15 October declaring that "the good relations between Haiti and the Dominican Republic have not suffered any damage." Vincent's failure to initially press for justice for the slain workers prompted protests in Port-au-Prince after two years of relative silence. It was known that Vincent had a cooperative relationship and financial support from the Trujillo government. However, some scholars claim that Trujillo actually supported a failed coup that occurred in December of 1937 against President Vincent. This takeover was attempted by the Garde d’Haïti; a national military organization in Haiti that had been trained by the United States. Following the failed coup, the Haitian president was eventually forced to seek an international investigation and mediation. Unwilling to submit to an inquiry, Trujillo instead offered an indemnity to Haiti.

In the end, US president Franklin D. Roosevelt and Haitian president Sténio Vincent sought reparations of US$750,000, of which the Dominican government paid $525,000, or around $30 per victim. Due to the corruption deeply embedded within the Haitian bureaucracy, survivors on average received only 2 cents each. In the agreement signed in Washington, DC, on 31 January 1938, the Dominican government defended the massacre as a response to illegal immigration by "undesirable" Haitians, and recognized "no responsibility whatsoever" for the killings with Trujillo stating how the agreement established new laws prohibiting migration between Haiti and the Dominican Republic. Trujillo's regime thus used a moment of international inquiry to legitimize his policies.

Thereafter, Trujillo began to develop the borderlands to link them more closely with the main cities and urban areas of the Dominican Republic. These areas were modernized, with the addition of modern hospitals, schools, political headquarters, military barracks, and housing projects—as well as a highway to connect the borderlands to major cities. Additionally, after 1937, quotas restricted the number of Haitians permitted to enter the Dominican Republic, and a strict and often discriminatory border policy was enacted. Dominicans continued to deport and kill Haitians in southern frontier regions—as refugees died of exposure, malaria and influenza.

Despite attempts to blame Dominican civilians, it has been confirmed by US sources that "bullets from Krag rifles were found in Haitian bodies, and only Dominican soldiers had access to this type of rifle." Therefore, the Haitian (Parsley) Massacre, which is still referred to as "el corte" (the cutting) by Dominicans and as "kouto-a" (the knife) by Haitians, was, "...a calculated action on the part of Dominican dictator Rafael Trujillo to homogenize the furthest stretches of the country in order to bring the region into the social, political and economic fold," and rid his republic of Haitians.

Following the massacre, Trujillo made continued attempts to isolate the Haitians in the Dominican Republic. One way he did this was by pushing them to work on sugar plantations, as sugar cane is the nation's most important crop. Roughly 40% of Haitians in the Dominican Republic prior to the massacre worked on sugar plantations, and this proportion increased afterward due to displacement. In the years that followed, despite the massacre, sugar companies had been secretly still recruiting laborers from Haiti.

Despite Trujillo’s claim that the massacre and the policies that followed were an attempt to curb Haitian migration, the amount of Haitian immigrants did not decline. Rather it was encouraged by the regime to sustain the sugar industry. To maintain control, Trujillo tried to isolate Haitians by confining them to sugar plantations, making plantation labor their only acceptable role in Dominican society. Although not established through formal legislation, Trujillo’s government relied on local officials who used “extralegal” measures to pressure Haitians to move to sugar plantations and to abandon any land that they owned.

Scholars argue that since the sugar industry mattered economically, the regime opted for coercion in these zones, rather than mass killing. A 1940 government handbook instructed local officials (alcalde pedáneos) to monitor and resist “Haitianizing influences,” portraying Haitians as a threat to Dominican society. Decades later, after Trujillo’s assassination, Dominican President Joaquín Balaguer formalized these anti-Haitian policies, confining laborers to sugar plantations and declaring that they would only be tolerated in cane-cutting areas.

Additionally, following the massacre, the Trujillo regime utilized various forms of propaganda in an attempt to justify the event, and reshape Dominican identity. This propaganda appeared in books, schools, and churches, and painted Haitians as “pagan,” “diseased,” and “inferior.” In contrast, Dominicans were framed as “civilized.” During this period, Dominican intellectuals like Manuel Arturo Peña Batlle and Joaquín Balaguer claimed that Haitians were “biologically and culturally inferior.”

To reinforce this ideology, the Trujillo regime promoted Catholicism and the Spanish language to try and erase Haitian cultural influence. In doing so, Trujillo partnered with the Catholic Church and signed a Concordat with the Vatican in 1954. Religion was used as a contrast between Dominican “virtue” and “pagan Haitian vice.” Decades later, Joaquín Balaguer revived the anti-Haitian ideology in the 1980s, calling Haitian migration a “biological invasion.”

Condemnation of the massacres was not limited to international sources, as a number of Trujillo's exiled political opponents also publicly spoke out against the events. In November 1937, four anti-Trujillistas were declared "unworthy Dominicans" and "traitors to the Homeland" for their comments—Rafael Brache, José Manuel Jimenes, Juan Isidro Jimenes Grullón, and Buenaventura Sánchez.

== Legacy ==
The Parsley massacre has been reimagined and remembered through US and Caribbean literature and continues to be used to explain shared trauma, memory, and historical silencing in the aftermath of Trujillo’s regime. Literature in Latin America is one of the few places where the massacre is truly remembered and honored. The massacre is remembered as a foundational trauma that has shaped Dominican-Haitian relations and the shared memory of it has been passed down through generations.

Although there is no formal memorial or monument remembering the Parsley massacre, authors, artists, and poets have Literary recreations of the massacre such as Haitian author René Philoctète’s 1975 novel Le Peuple des terres mêlées (“The People of Mixed Lands”), humanize the Haitian victims and help remember the story through multiple voices. The author aims to “demystify the other” and bring light to those who have been forgotten through time.

== See also ==
- 1804 Haitian massacre
- Anti-Haitian sentiment in the Dominican Republic
- Beheadings of Moca
- Dominican Republic–Haiti relations
- History of the Dominican Republic
- History of Haiti
- Human rights in the Dominican Republic
- Human rights in Haiti
- List of massacres in the Dominican Republic
- List of massacres in Haiti
- Racism in the Dominican Republic
- Shibboleth
