= Batey (sugar workers' town) =

Settlement built around a sugar mill, in the Caribbean

A batey (plural: bateyes) is a settlement around a sugar mill. They can be found in Cuba, the Dominican Republic and Puerto Rico.

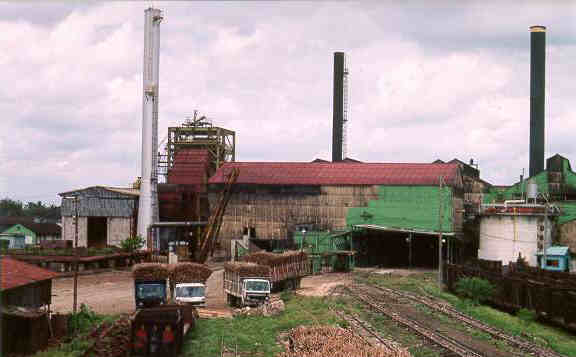
Sugar mill in Ingenio Consuelo, Dominican Republic

In Cuba and the Dominican Republic, the basic conglomerate unit of a sugar production is usually called an ingenio. An ingenio consists of a central administrative office, a sugar cane mill, a sugar refinery, the town around the office and refinery, sugar fields (campos de caña), and miscellaneous production equipment like trucks, trains, tractors, weighing scales, and housing for workers, usually in what is called a batey.

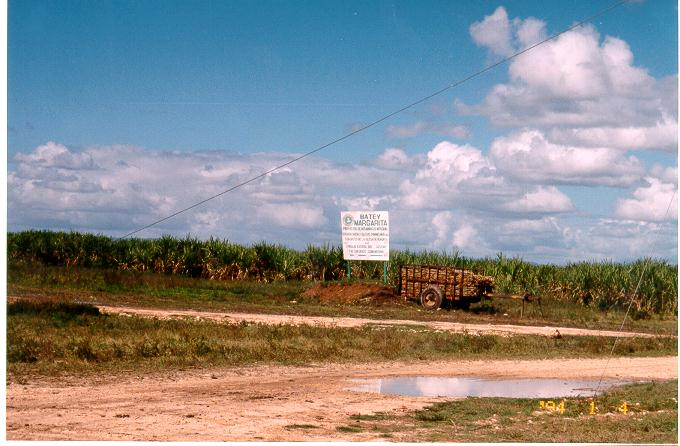
Canefields beside a batey near Ingenio Consuelo, Dominican Republic

A batey is a company town consisting of barracks and a few houses. Bateyes vary in size considerably. They are located close to cane fields so that groups of workers can live nearby their labor site.

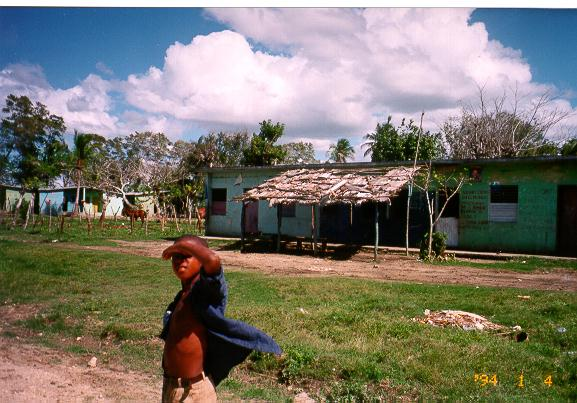
Dwellings on a batey in Holguín, Cuba

== Dominican Republic ==
Every year since 1933, seasonal immigrants from Haiti have arrived to work the sugar harvest in the Dominican Republic. The migrants are lodged in rooms at the batey, sometimes with no facilities, and expected to work cropping sugar cane in long days with hard hours.

These days, individual ingenios and land owners (colonos) pay headhunters (buscones), a fee for each cane cutter (picador) the headhunter provides. A headhunter may entice the prospective labourer with promises of a work permit, and often requires a large fee from the prospective immigrant. When immigrants arrive, they may find that they are not free to leave the batey until they finish the labor.

Over time, some of these migrants have stayed through the six months that follow the cane harvest (zafra), called "dead time" (tiempo muerto), and have started families with Haitian women that have migrated as well. Bateys are unique in culture and language in their mix of that which is Haitian and that which is Dominican.

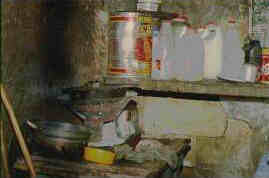
Kitchen facilities in a dwelling on a batey

The Dominican government has historically provided fewer public services to bateys than to similarly sized communities in the rest of the country mainly due to Bateyes being seen as illegal settlements. The bateys were regarded as exceptions to the country's governance system. It was often left to the State Sugar Council (CEA: Consejo Estatal de Azúcar) or private companies to provide basic services, a responsibility that all too often they did not fulfill. Bateys were often still regarded as places where only Haitians (non-citizens) live.

Since the Haitians who originally filled the bateys were not legal immigrants, their children have often been denied citizenship papers because they are considered to have been born while in transit. Without citizenship papers from Haiti either, these children of Haitian immigrants cannot go to school nor can they receive the benefits of other public services; however, a number of non-governmental organizations have attempted to address this problem by operating primary schools on bateys trying to get them Dominican citizenship.

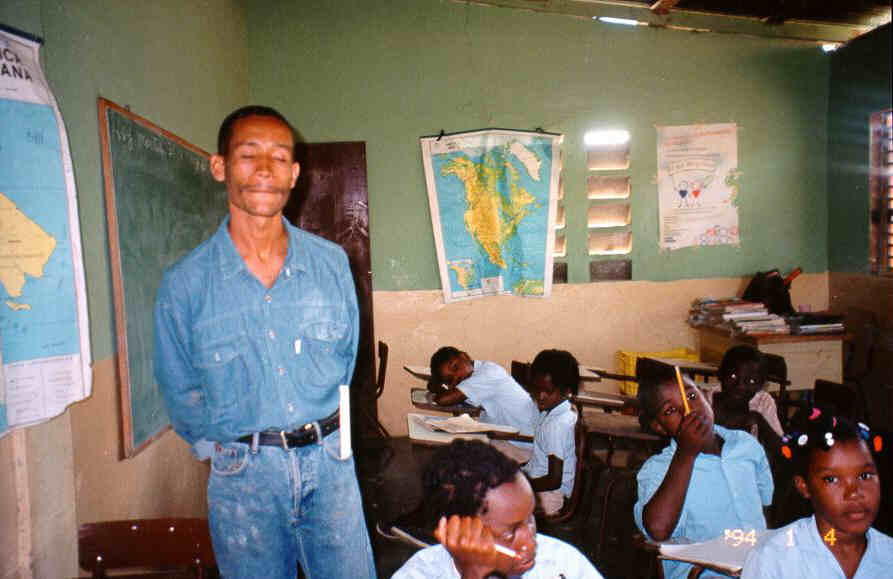
School established on a batey near Consuelo, Dominican Republic

In the past, sugar was a profitable industry. However, the Dominican sugar industry is no longer competitive, and when combined with the historical lack of educational and health services to these communities, the low wages have tended to make bateys some of the poorest communities in the country.

The current trend in the Dominican Republic is for the ingenios to stop production, and thus the only source of income for the community and for the bateys to very slowly transform themselves into new sorts of communities. Los Alcarrizos in the Santo Domingo province is a good example of something that used to be a batey but now is a municipality which survives through jobs in the area and in Santo Domingo.
