= Palma Sola, Dominican Republic =

Palma Sola
- Location within the Dominican Republic
- Coordinates: 18°59′43″N 71°32′13″W
- Country: Dominican Republic
- Province: San Juan

Palma Sola is a community in the San Juan province. The Palma Sola massacre occurred here in 1962.
