= Manuel Arturo Peña Batlle =

Dominican lawyer, historian, diplomat and politician

Manuel Arturo Peña Batlle (26 February 1902 – 15 April 1954) was a Dominican Republic lawyer, historian, diplomat, and politician who served as a Foreign Minister of the Dominican Republic between 1943 and 1946 and shaped its relation with Haiti in the 1940s.

Peña Batlle was born in the city of San Carlos on 26 February 1902. At the age of 21, he graduated from the University of Santo Domingo with a degree in international law. He wrote a number of works on the history of the Dominican Republic statehood and is considered one of the most important Dominican Republic historians.

A metro station in Santo Domingo is named after him.
