= Siege of Santo Domingo (1808) =

1808–1809 battle of the Spanish reconquest of Santo Domingo

- Part of the Spanish reconquest of Santo Domingo
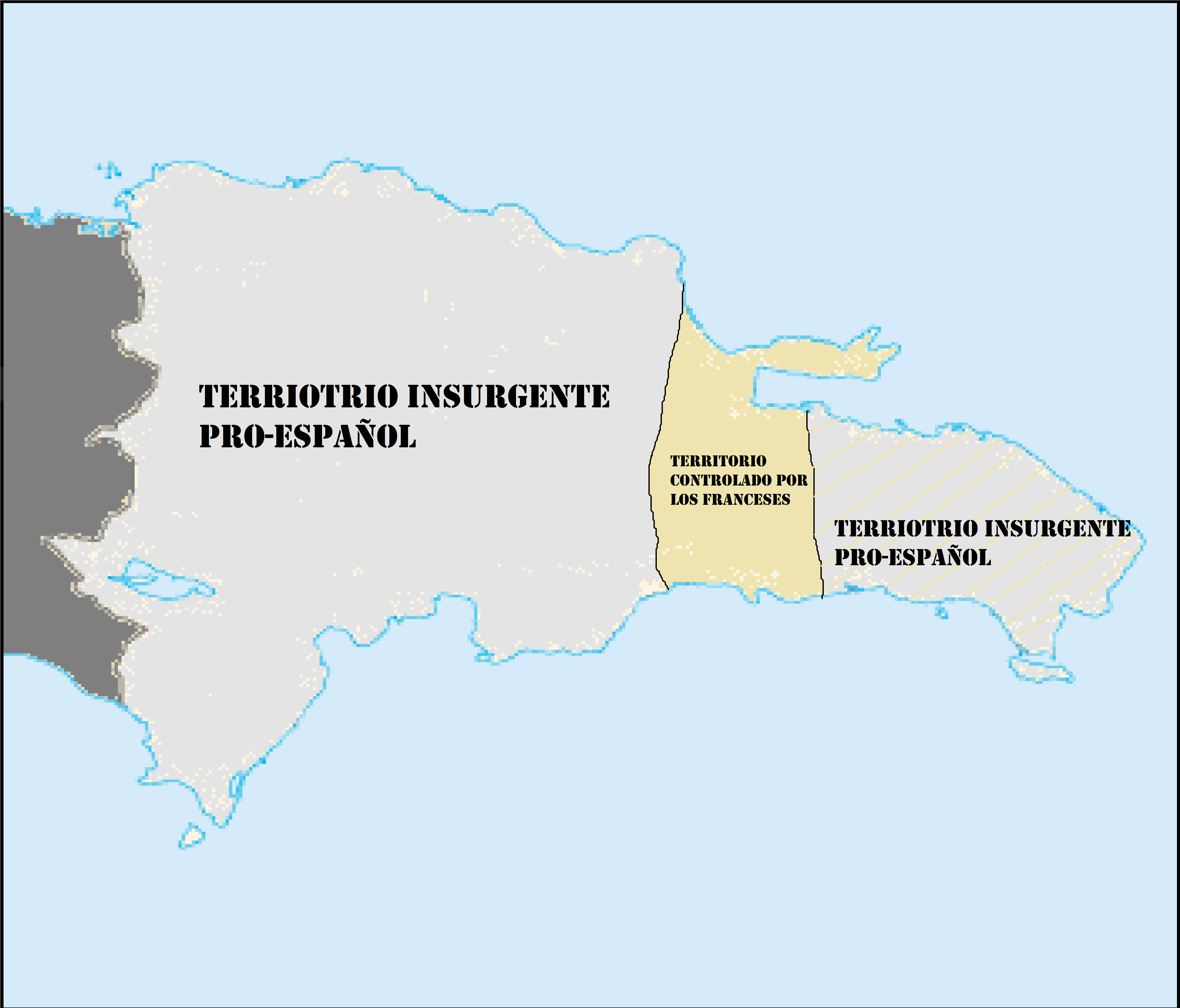
- Map of the situation of the colony of Santo Domingo (1800) during the War of the Reconquest between France and the Anglo-Spanish alliance
Date	November 7, 1808 – July 11, 1809
Location	Colony of Santo Domingo
Result	Dominican victory: End of French rule

Belligerents
Colony of Santo Domingo; United Kingdom	France

Commanders and leaders
Gen. Juan Sánchez Ramírez (United Kingdom) Comm. Hugh Lyle Carmichael	(France) Gen. Joseph-David de Barquier (surrendered)

Strength
1,850 regulars and militia 6 frigates	2,000 regulars

The siege of Santo Domingo (1808) (Spanish: Sitio de Santo Domingo de 1808) was the second and final major battle of the Spanish reconquest of Santo Domingo and was fought between November 7, 1808 and July 11, 1809 at Santo Domingo, Captaincy General of Santo Domingo. A force of Dominican and Puerto Rican of 1,850 troops led by Gen. Juan Sánchez Ramírez, with a naval blockaded by British Commander Hugh Lyle Carmichael, besieged and captured the city of Santo Domingo after an 8 months garrisoning of 2,000 troops of the French Army led by General Joseph-David de Barquier.

== Background ==
Upon hearing the news of Napoleon's invasion of Spain in 1808, Juan Sánchez Ramírez launched a war against the French troops who were nominally controlling the island. After some initial defeats, the loyalists managed a key victory in November, in the Battle of Palo Hincado, where Sánchez Ramírez's 2,000 soldiers overwhelmed Gen. Jean-Louis Ferrand's 600. There, with his numbers diminished owing to the desertion of Dominicans, the French commander faced certain defeat.

Ferrand's pride was so wounded that he killed himself after the defeat. This would not stop the French, however, and General Joseph-David de Barquier took over the fight. He resorted to enlisting Dominican slaves to fight against Sánchez Ramírez. Only with the help of the British Jamaicans could the loyalists expel the French, an event that would finally come to pass in 1809, the year in which British gunships fired into Santo Domingo, prompting Barquier to surrender the island.

== See also ==
- Siege of Santo Domingo (1805)
- Spanish reconquest of Santo Domingo
