= Ciriaco Ramírez =

Creole revolutionary of the Dominican Republic (1772–1819)

Ciriaco Ramírez (1772–1819) was a Dominican military man, landowner and revolutionary. Materialist history presents him as a precursor of independence thought during the Reconquista War in Santo Domingo (now the Dominican Republic), however, there is not a single document that proves it. His activities following the war against France remains unknown. While some historians say that Ciriaco was imprisoned and confined to Ceuta for his independence activity, where he supposedly died, this shows that perhaps during the period known as España Boba, he was an officer in the army of the Spanish colony of Santo Domingo.

== Biography ==
He was born in 1772. He was of full Spanish descent.

The scant information known from his birth until his arrival in Santo Domingo is due to what was reflected in the judicial process that followed him in 1810. There he described himself as having been born in Cádiz, thirty-five years old, white, a farmer and a resident of the city of Azua.

He distinguished himself by participating in the Dominican insurrection against the French occupation of Santo Domingo. The colony had previously been ceded to France by the Treaty of Basel in 1795, and was governed by French troops from 1801. When it became known in Santo Domingo of the imprisonment of Charles IV and his family and of the occupation of Spain by Napoleon's troops, Ramírez, together with Cristóbal Huber and others, organized troops in the southern region of the island of Santo Domingo to join the contingents from other regions that advocated for the withdrawal of French troops from the Spanish part of the island and its reincorporation into the Spanish Crown, in the so-called War of the Reconquest.

French Governor Jean-Louis Ferrand put a price on his head as a conspirator. Ramírez, as head of the southern contingents, joined forces with those led by Juan Sánchez Ramírez with creoles from the Cibao and eastern regions to form an army that faced the French troops commanded by Ferrand. Ramírez participated in the siege of Santo Domingo in favor of reconquering the eastern territory to return it to Spain and never changed his mind.

Ciriaco Ramírez did not participate in the Battle of Palo Hincado, because when it occurred he was still in the fields of the south. When he arrived to the capital on November 30, 1808, the French battalion commanded by Aussenac had already returned from that same region, which means that the confrontations they sustained were of very little importance, on November 15, 1808 the Dominicans led by Juan Sánchez Ramírez arrived and besieged the walled city of Santo Domingo, because the French army that had not participated with Ferrand in Palo Hincado led by General Joseph-David de Barquier, was strengthened when it was reinforced by the platoon that arrived from the south.

Later, Ciriaco Ramírez arrived with the people from the South and he did not care about anything other than taking command, wanting to remove Juan Sánchez Ramírez from it. He was assigned a point in the siege to take charge of, but he took advantage of the opportunity to leave point by point, instructing the soldiers to send a representative the next day to a meeting, the Junta of Bondillo, that he himself would preside over, by order, according to him, of Juan Sánchez Ramírez. The meeting was held by order of Juan Sánchez Ramírez, that is, he decided to hold the meeting proposed by Ciriaco Ramírez, however, Ciriaco never showed up at this meeting, but the people from the south did, where at no time were two opposing parties present, and much less did any of the participants speak out for or against the independence of Santo Domingo.

It has been said as a way of speculating on the unknown, that Ciriaco Ramírez, after being taken prisoner by order of Juan Sánchez Ramírez, was taken to Puerto Rico, later, he was returned to Santo Domingo to be tried and sentenced to a jail in Spain. This constitutes another falsehood and another lie by the aforementioned historians and their repeaters. In reality he was taken prisoner by order of Sánchez Ramírez and taken to Puerto Rico because in the place where he was assigned there was disorder, due to his attitude as commander in chief of the reconquering army; but in September 1810 he returned to Santo Domingo and was interrogated because he was accused of having ordered the death of the French officer known as Commander Casilla. This event occurred while he was with his troops in the southern region on campaign against the French. However, everything seems to indicate that it could not be proven that he had anything to do with this crime and he was released, by virtue of the publication of a document in the work Historical News of Santo Domingo by the priest historian Fray Cipriano de Utrera, (on page 140) it says:

"December 9, 1814. - granting the title of Lieutenant Colonel with the salary of infantry captain to Ciriaco Ramírez."

On April 8, 1815, during the governorship of Urrutia, he reports having received in his office the son of Ciriaco Ramírez, José Joaquín Ramírez, requesting to be ordained in the army of the Spanish colony, the note says that he is the oldest of them.

He died in 1819, at age 47, under unknown circumstances.

== Historiography ==
For many historians, Ciriaco Ramírez is often a forgotten historical figure in the Dominican Republic. However, the story of Ciriaco Ramírez's life has been woven from a web of contradictions and falsehoods, always trying to diminish the merits of his struggle. Juan Bosch, for example, apparently does not grant him any military merit, judging by this paragraph of his:

“For his part, Don Ciriaco Ramírez, the head of the group that would operate in the southern band, rose up with weapons also brought from Puerto Rico, but French forces under the command of Colonel Aussenac forced him to take refuge in the forests of the region.”

== See also ==
- Juan Sánchez Ramírez
- Spanish reconquest of Santo Domingo
