= Campuzano-Polanco family =

Family

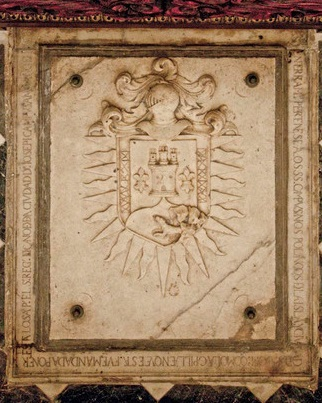
Burial slab of the Campuzano Polanco in their Chapel del Rosario

Campuzano-Polanco was a prominent family from the Captaincy General of Santo Domingo (today Dominican Republic) with origins in Santiago de los Caballeros. During the colonial era of the Hispaniola, their members and descendants went on to occupy high political, military, and ecclesiastical positions, locally and outside the Island, as well as in the metropolis of Spain. Their merits span from the beginning until the end of the colony.

== Origins ==
Pedro Perez Polanco (c. 1635 – 1714) was a captain of the military bands of the "cincuentenas" (bands of 50 cavalry lancers ) from the northern part of the island of Hispaniola who successfully led military campaigns in the English invasion of Penn and Venables in 1655 and in the Battle of the Limonade in 1691. Along with other captains such as Luis Lopez Tirado, Antonio Pichardo Vinuesa, Jose Morel de Santa Cruz, Francisco del Monte and others, Polanco constituted the military and political class of Santiago de los Caballeros and the North coast.

Perez Polanco was also Mayor of Santiago de los Caballeros and well off hatero (herder), rancher, and sugar mill owner. He was the only son and successor of Garcia Perez Polanco (c.1620- 1656), who had also been a captain of the northern military bands defending the northern coast and towns against buccaneers and filibusters from Tortuga Island. His mother was Ines Martinez Mejia de Henao.

His grandfather, Pedro Polanco de Henao (c. 1585 – 1679), was Mayor of the town Concepcion de La Vega in 1623 and was married to Ana Minaya Alconchel. His great-grandparents Garcia Perez Polanco (c.1535) and Apolinaria de Henao y Almeida Casasola were descendants of nobles and the earliest settlers of Santiago de los Caballeros, La Vega, and Cotui, three of the oldest European settlements in the American continent. Garcia Perez Polanco was also Mayor of La Vega around 1575

His great-great-grandfather, Garcia de Polanco (Santillana del Mar, Spain, c.1480- ) was one of the first settlers who landed in the New World. He arrived with Christopher Columbus in the Gallega ship on his 4th voyage in 1502 that attempted to circumnavigate the world for the first time.

His relatives include Luis Polanco mayor of Cotui in 1638 and Garcia Polanco, Vicar General in 1660 under Archbishop Francisco Pio Guadalupe Tellez

Pedro Perez Polanco married Bernarda Martinez de Rojas. Bernarda was the daughter of Fulgencio Martinez de Ugarte, a relator of the Royal Audiencia, and Ana de Rojas Figueroa, sister of Don Gabriel de Rojas Valle Figueroa, leader and commander of the Capture of Fort Rocher in the Tortuga Island in 1654.

Their daughter, Maria Josefa Perez Polanco (c. 1660 – 1744) married Gregorio Semillan Campuzano. Campuzano (b. 1648) was from Guadalajara, Spain and arrived in the island in 1680 as an assessor of the Governor Francisco de Segura Sandoval y Castilla (1678–1684). He was also Mayor of Santiago de los Caballeros and wrote a chronicle titled "Memorial" where the living conditions and economy of the north of the island at the time were described. They had at least five sons and three daughters, who used the compound surname Campuzano-Polanco as a sign of distinction, a tradition that all the descendants adopted as well.

== 1st generation ==
=== Francisco Gregorio Campuzano Polanco (1682–1765) ===
Dedicated to the clergy and became Prior Provincial of the Dominican Order (Order of the Preachers) in 1720 for the area of Santa Cruz de las Indias with a wide jurisdiction over the convents of Santo Domingo, Puerto Rico, Venezuela, Cuba and Jamaica. He received his doctorate of theology in the Convent of Santa Maria sopra Minerva in Rome in 1721.

=== Pedro Campuzano Polanco (1685–1754) ===
Captain of the Royal Armies from 1708 to 1719. He was Lieutenant Colonel of the city of La Vega, Villa del Cotuí, and its parties in 1719, in charge of evicting the enemies who were approaching the coasts. Along with his brother Jose, he financed many successful privateer corsair expeditions in the early 1700s. He played a major role in pacifying the uprising in the city of Santiago, known as the "Revolt of the Captains" and was in charge of the incorporation to the island of the families and victims of the Guadalupe and Tolosa Shipwreck in 1724. Later he was mayor of Santo Domingo from 1752 to 1754. His son, Antonio Bruno Campuzano-Polanco, became the head/rector priest of the Cathedral Primate of the Americas.

=== Jose Campuzano Polanco (1698–1760) ===
A privateer corsair from Santo Domingo during the Caribbean's Golden Age of Piracy in the first half of the 18th century operating under a "patente de corso" (letter of marque). He was an extremely active corsair of the Caribbean region in the fight against illicit trade with countries other than Spain, capturing more than 50 foreign ships with his ships El Firme (his first vessel), N.S. Popa, and Maria.

Known for his deep knowledge of the seas, he was awarded patente de corso to operate expeditions in Cartagena, Santa Marta, Maracaibo, Florida, Puerto Rico and the island of Santa Cruz, among other areas. In theory privateering aimed to stop contraband but in reality it was a very important activity for the island of Santo Domingo providing basic necessities to the population.

==== Battle of Cartagena de Indias (1741) ====
Jose Campuzano-Polanco was also one of the naval Captains who, along with Lorenzo Alderete and Carlos Desnaux, defended Cartagena in the Spanish victory in the Battle of Cartagena de Indias in 1741 commanded by Admiral Blas de Lezo (known as "Half Man"), the most crucial battle of the War of Jenkins' Ear (La Guerra del Asiento). He wrote a diary about the battle which along with the diary of English lieutenant William Forbes, are the two main sources for the telling of this historical encounter in the Caribbean.

=== Juan Campuzano Polanco (1695–1780) ===
Juan Campuzano Polanco was an hatero and landowner in Santiago de los Caballeros and the north west region of the island involved in livestock exports and tobacco haciendas. He married Beatriz Sanchez Firpo, daughter of Captain corsair Domingo Moreno Sanchez from Santa Cruz de Tenerife and had at least 5 children: fray Antonio, who was Prior Provincial of the Mercedarian Order; Luis, Mariana, Dr. Pbr. Pedro, and Diego.

His youngest son Col. Lt. Diego Polanco (1770 – c. 1840) was the military commander for the Cibao region of Santo Domingo in the Battle of Palo Hincado in 1808 as well as the president of the Assembly of Bondillo which returned Santo Domingo to Spain from France.

=== Francisco Campuzano Polanco (1689–1741) ===
A maestre de campo who moved to Coro, Venezuela, and there he married Francisca Morillo de Ayala and founded cacao farms for exportation. He became Teniente gobernador (lieutenant governor) of Coro, mayor of the city in 1715 and provincial official of the Cajas Reales. His children were assigned military positions and engaged in agricultural activities. One of his sons Francisco Campuzano-Polanco Morillo was mayor of Coro as well and Jose moved back and resided in Santo Domingo.

== 2nd generation ==
=== Jose Campuzano-Polanco Morillo (1723 – c. 1800) ===
Returned to Santo Domingo to manage the sugar mill of Barbarroja in Hato Mayor which belonged to the family and became the first Provincial Mayor of the Santa Hermandad when the title was first created in the island in 1758. Jose Campuzano, also known as Dr. Don Jose Polanco, obtained a doctorate in law from the University of Santo Tomas de Aquino in 1751 and was named mayor of Santo Domingo in 1752 by Governor Francisco Rubio y Peñaranda (1751–1759).

He married Rosa Fernandez de Lara and had one son, Adrian and three daughters, Maria Magdalena who married Nicolas Heredia Serrano Pimentel, Josefa who married Jose Maria Mieses Guridi, a wealthy rancher and Maria Magdalena Catalina who married Ignacio Perez Caro, great-grandson of former Governor Ignacio Perez Caro.

== 3rd generation ==
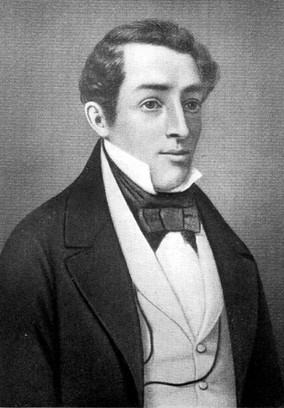
José María Heredia y Heredia (1803–1839)

=== Adrian Campuzano-Polanco Fernandez (1754–1819) ===
Adrian Campuzano-Polanco was the first criollo from Santo Domingo to be elected as a deputy to the Cortes of Cádiz in 1811 as a Member for America and the Philippines, positions to which he resigned or did not accept. He married Rosa Perez-Caro, granddaughter of the Governor Ignacio Perez Caro. He was the last mayor of Santo Domingo in 1797–1798 before the Era of France of Santo Domingo. He was also rector of the University of Santo Tomas de Aquino in 1795 after obtaining his doctorate in law that same year, asesor of the Army in Cuba and lawyer for the Royal Audencia in Camaguey, Cuba.

== 4th generation ==
=== Francisco Javier Caro (Santo Domingo, 1773 – Madrid, 1848) ===
Francisco Javier Caro was the son of Maria Magdalena Catalina Campuzano-Polanco Fernandez and Ignacio Perez Caro y Oviedo, great-grandson of former Governor Ignacio Perez Caro. One of his three sisters, Maria Belen Caro Campuzano-Polanco, was married to Manuel Zequeira y Arango, considered the first Cuban poet.

He became rector of the University of Salamanca from 1798 to 1800 after studying there years before, being one of the few American criollos ever to do so.

He was member of the Supreme Central and Governing Junta and Captain General of Castilla la Vieja (1808–1810) and was the royal commissary for the King of Spain in the island of Santo Domingo in charge of the institutional reorganization of the country at the start of the 2nd Spanish Colony after La Reconquista of Juan Sanchez Ramirez in 1808.

He was deputy for America in the Cortes of Cádiz from 1813 to 1814 and in 1821, minister of the Consejo de Indias from 1815 to 1817 and in 1834 and a member of the court of Isabel II from 1833 to 1836. Caro was named Procer del Reino by Isabel II in 1834. He was also testamentary of King Fernando VII.

== 5th generation ==
=== José María Heredia (1803–1839) ===
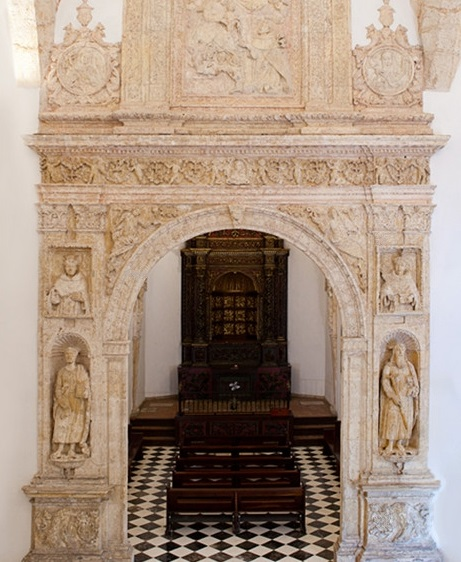
Private Chapel Virgin del Rosario of the Campuzano Polanco in the Convent of the Dominican Order

Maria Mercedes Heredia Campuzano-Polanco, daughter of Nicolas Heredia Serrano and Maria Magdalena Campuzano-Polanco Fernandez, married Jose Francisco Heredia Mieses. They were the parents of poet José María Heredia (1803–1839), considered by many to be the first romantic poet of America He is known as "El Cantor del Niagara" and was named National Poet of Cuba. Jose Maria Heredia's mentor and professor was his own cousin, Francisco Javier Caro.

== Private burial chapel of the Campuzano-Polanco ==
In the early 18th century Francisco Gregorio Campuzano-Polanco built the Chapel of Virgin del Rosario in the Church of the Convent of the Dominican Order. The family became the owners of the chapel and most its members are buried there.

The vault of the chapel is decorated with the twelve zodiacal sign around the sun, and because of this the chapel is also called the Chapel of the Zodiac. In addition in the vault there are other personages like the Olympic Gods that represent the four seasons. This unique chapel is the only one of its kind in America and one of the four vaults with astrological representations that exist today in the world, along with the Celestial Vault or "Sky of Salamanca" in the University of Salamanca, Chapel of the Benaventes in Rioseco and the Chapel of Osiris in the Hathor Temple of Dandera
