= Siege of Santo Domingo =

Siege of Santo Domingo may refer to:

- Siege of Santo Domingo (1655)
- Siege of Santo Domingo (1805)
- Siege of Santo Domingo (1808)
