= Occupation of the Dominican Republic =

Military occupations of the Dominican Republic have occurred several times, including:

- French occupation of Santo Domingo, from 1795 to 1809
- Foolish Spanish period, from 1809 to 1821
- Haitian occupation of the Dominican Republic, from 1822 to 1844
- Spanish occupation of the Dominican Republic, from 1861 to 1865
- United States occupation of the Dominican Republic (1916–24)
- United States occupation of the Dominican Republic (1965–66) (more properly, the Organization of American States occupation of the Dominican Republic)
