= Era de Francia =

French rule in the Dominican Republic (1795–1815 de jure)

Captaincy General of Santo Domingo Capitainerie générale de Saint-Domingue (French) Capitanía General de Santo Domingo (Spanish)
- Captaincy General of France
- 1795–1815
- Flag Coat of arms of the First French Empire

- French territory from 1795-1809

Anthem
- Chant du départ ("Song of the Departure") (official) Veillons au salut de l'Empire ("Let's ensure the salvation of the Empire") (unofficial)
- Demonym: Dominican
- Area
  - 1795: 76,192 km^{2} (29,418 sq mi)
  - 1804: 48,671 km^{2} (18,792 sq mi)
- Population
  - 1804: 126,000
- Government
  - Type: Captaincy General
- President
  - 1795–1799: Jean-François Rewbell
  - 1804–1815: Napoleon
- Governor-General
  - 1801–1802: Toussaint Louverture
  - 1808–1809: Jean-Louis Ferrand
- History
  - Treaty of Basel: 22 July 1795
  - Spain reconquers Santo Domingo: 9 July 1809
  - Treaty of Paris: 20 November 1815
Preceded by	Succeeded by
Captaincy General of Santo Domingo	España Boba
- Today part of: Dominican Republic

In the history of the Dominican Republic, the period of Era de Francia ('Era of France', 'French Era', 'Age of France' or 'French Period') occurred in 1795 when France acquired the Captaincy General of Santo Domingo, annexed it into Saint-Domingue and briefly came to acquire the whole island of Hispaniola by the way of the Treaty of Basel, allowing Spain to cede the eastern province as a consequence of the French Revolutionary Wars.

Despite its brevity, it produced important changes in society, especially in the demographic aspect, as there was a massive emigration of settlers (especially those with greater resources) to Puerto Rico, Venezuela and Cuba, some out of loyalty to Spain, and others as a result of the Haitians invasions perpetrated by Haitian forces commanded by Toussaint L'ouverture and Jean-Jacques Dessalines in 1801 and 1805, respectively. The colony lost two-thirds of its population and almost all of the oldest and most traditional aristocratic families on the island; in addition, the population on the Spanish side went from being predominantly white to being essentially mulatto. The establishment of French settlers and the return of some emigrants barely attenuated this population decline.

During this time, it was also referred to as the French Santo Domingo, the Captaincy General was divided into two separate departments, each with its own governor and autonomy – Cibao Department, with its at Sant-Yago (now Santiago de los Caballeros) and Ozama Department.

== Background ==
In 1665, French colonization of the western part of the island was officially recognized by Louis XIV. The French colony was given the name Saint-Domingue. In the 1697 Treaty of Ryswick, Spain formally ceded the western third of the island to France. Saint-Domingue quickly came to overshadow the east in both wealth and population. Nicknamed the "Pearl of the Antilles," it became the richest colony in the West Indies and one of the richest in the world. Large sugar cane plantations were established and worked by hundreds of thousands of African slaves who were imported to the island. In 1754, the population numbered 14,000 whites, 4,000 free mulattoes and 172,000 negroes.

The Spanish colony on the other hand sank lower than ever. Practically abandoned by Spain, there was no commerce beyond a little contraband and only the most indispensable agriculture, the inhabitants devoting themselves almost entirely to cattle raising. The ports were the haunts of pirates, and a number of Dominicans also became privateers. Santo Domingo's population grew from 6,000 in 1737 to 125,000 in 1790; 40,000 were white settlers, 25,000 were free people of color and 60,000 were slaves. However, it remained poor and neglected in contrast with Saint-Domingue, which by the 1790s had become the wealthiest American colony with half a million inhabitants.

The division of Hispaniola between France and Spain in 1697 recognized a reality with which neither the Kings nor their Revolutionary successors were happy. Although the population of Spanish Santo Domingo was perhaps one-fourth that of French Saint-Domingue, this did not prevent Charles IV of Spain from launching an invasion of the French side of the island in 1793, attempting to take advantage of the chaos sparked by the French Revolution (1789–99). Although the Spanish military effort went well on Hispaniola, it did not do so in Europe. As a consequence, Spain was forced to cede Santo Domingo to the French under the terms of the Treaty of Basel (22 July 1795) to get the French to withdraw from Spain.

News that the Spanish colony had been ceded to France reached Santo Domingo in October 1795. Those who could not reconcile themselves to the new situation had up to a year to remove themselves to Cuba, Puerto Rico, or Venezuela, where they were to be given facilities to make a fresh start. Between 1795 and 1810 some 125,000 persons are estimated to have left the Spanish sector of the island, leaving its population diminished by two-thirds compared with what it had been before the French Revolution.

=== Slave insurrections ===
Just as with the previous centuries against Spain, further slave rebellions erupted, this time against France. In this period, out of the four conspiracies exclusively slaves, three of them on haciendas or mills. These attempts or rebellions had as a note distinctive that transcended the mere act of liberation limited group or search for particular claims characteristics of the palenques or manieles maroons. (Note: An illustrative example of this characteristic was the Maniel de Neiba that resisted for years in the southern mountains. Between 1783 and 1796, at the initiative of the maroons themselves, their reduction was negotiated and what they demanded was the freedom and delivery of lands. Finally, they were regrouped in a town created especially for them: "Los Naranjos". Carlos Esteban Deive, Los cirnavvones del maniel de Neiba. Santo Domingo, Central Bank of the Dominican Republic, 1985. Passirn). These movements had several greater objectives which included the overthrow of colonial rule, the elimination of whites, the implementation of racial equality or a union with Saint-Domingue. They occurred at the time of development of the Haitian Revolution, the influence of the French Revolution that brought new ideas and a liberating speech. With this background, the conspiracies of this first moment

==== Rebellion in Hincha: 1793 ====
The state of anxiety and fear had remained everpresent since the incidents of El Negro Comegente, which further overwhelmed Dominican slave owners. In addition, rumors about the advances or setbacks of slaves in Saint-Domingue were scattered among whites and blacks, free and slaves. In 1793, Don Pedro Vasquez, denounced an alleged rebellion plan by the slaves of Hincha, one of the Spanish towns closest to the Dominican-Haitian border. The story began with a free black man named Dimini, who was declared captain of the insurrection of the revolt through a letter written by "San Fransua," as told by Jean-François Papillon, who since 1792 fought against France under the flag of Spain. The slave Thomas, one of the Insurgents involved, affirmed:

"I had spoken with Capt. Dimini, the one who had showed him a piece of paper and had told him that San Fransua had written naming him as captain of all the blacks of the Spanish part and that in it he was arrested that after it finished with all the would he come here to wage war.

Although Thomas could not read, the presence of a document supposedly written by Papilion, convinced him to join the plot. In an illiterate society, the legitimacy of the written or printed letter was significant. Asked in the judgment that was made that since so few proposed such an undertaking, he answered that "they were confident that starting with them, everyone had to continue". The plan, apparently, was to start a revolt at the Chamuscadillas Hacienda of Pedro Vasquez, kill all the white people in it, seize the weapons and then continue like this with all the whites of the Spanish Part. The slaves involved demonstrated shrewd handling of politics of the moment, for example, Dimini, to defend himself, stated that Papilion could not be part of said plan because he was an ally of the Spanish and, on the contrary, said: "that San Fransua, as you hear it said, has generally been behaved very well with the Spanish and did not want to admit no Spanish black, rather has handed over to his masters how many have gone to the colony." Slaves had become aware of the strategic alliance of Papilion and the Spanish, which prevented any unity with the slaves of Spanish Santo Domingo. In other words, although Jean Franqois was a source of inspiration, he could not really support.

==== Samana slave rebellion: 1795 ====
Over the next two years, news of negotiations between the Spanish and French over the Spanish colony brought new concerns and readings of the revolution in progress. The regent of the Royal Hearing in Santo Domingo, Jose Antonio de Urizar, in November 1795, indicated his concern about the presence of French commissioners who:

"(...) have scattered various printed papers, and have also tried to extend by word of mouth that the slaves that are found in the Spanish possessions since the present Those owned by the Republic must be free without any distinction, and these propositions have made them spread by themselves, and through other French people so that they understand them our slaves."

From this international agreement the revolutionary influence of France, to the free blacks or slaves, it difficult to contain and its effects did not take long to be felt. In that same year, there was news that slaves from Samaná tried to carry out an uprising, encouraged by three white Frenchmen (Note: Fears of the French were expressed in a series of rumors and references to the circulation of revolutionary ideas always attributed to them. The figure of the "three Frenchman" appeared in several conspiracies, such as Samana in 1795; Boca de Nigua in 1796; and Fermin Nunez in 1816. As the names of participants are mentioned in the first and last, the fears and expectations associated with the looming revolutionary made by the French are recognized.) who had arrived clandestinely. As in Hincha, this attempt was revealed before it could be carried out and could have been a simple rumor.

==== Boca de Nigua Rebellion: 1796 ====
In 1796, there was the largest slave rebellion in the history of the Dominican Republic, when two hundred slaves of the Ingenio Boca de Nigua took up arms. This farm was considered as "the best established, richest and well governed of the entire Spanish Part and even of the entire island at the time." That is to say, the sugar producing company functioned as was desirable for slave interests. The high concentration of slaves and intensive exploitation provided the ideal conditions for a resistance movement. Unfortunately, in the documents of this rebellion, the voice of the slaves cannot be found because the then governor Joaquin Garcia y Moreno spoke for them. He said that the rebels intended initially attack his master to continue with all the targets and take over the estate, killing all slaves who did not take up arms on their behalf. They were counting on adding "the black ones that would fly from the neighboring Haciendas upon hearing the sound of Liberty and the extermination of the whites.”

The rebellious slaves intended to establish a government "like that of Guarico and others of the French Part."12 These words, in the governor's voice, clearly reflected way or another the influence of the liberating discourse that existed in the colony and that was a direct influence of the events in the French colony of Saint-Domingue. The authorities assumed that these were the ideas that inspired the slaves. In addition, the rebels had come into contact with three subordinates of Jean Franqois with whom they had obtained information about the way in which the insurrection had occurred in the neighboring colony. The reference to Jean-François Papilion appears again. Demonstrating great organizational capacity, they established a "commander of artillery, dragoons, and infantry." Inspired by the Haitian Revolution, the slaves of Boca de Nigua established a king and queen. For instance, Ana Maria, an enslaved woman, "more attended and distinguished by her lord, she offered herself to be the murderer and was the constituted Queen in the disorder, corresponding with entertainment and gifts."

Once the revolt was subdued, Garcia expressed his satisfaction "since it did not seem possible in a country like this that such disorder could be ended so quickly." Furthermore, he suggested that the rebellion had a lot of sympathy, since there were sectors among the slaves, naturally, and among the French people who left in defense of the accused can be interpreted in his description of the day the sentence was handed down:

"The day of justice was frightening and not taking measures capable of containing so many black people, both free and slave, and so many foreigners adhering to freedom and equality, closing the doors, establishing patrols, putting on weapons all the Guards and czen cattlemen For the execution, the troops were all ready in the barracks with the officers and in a word alert the entire garrison, we could having experienced a shock of the kind that has the island has been theater in its vicinity and feasible in a city that counts one year and four months of cessation to the French Republic."

The atrocious compliance with the sentence brought some peace of mind to the authorities. The rumor had been partially quelled and certainly over the next five years, conspiracies or slave rebellions had been halted.

== French occupation ==
=== Invasion of Toussaint Louverture ===
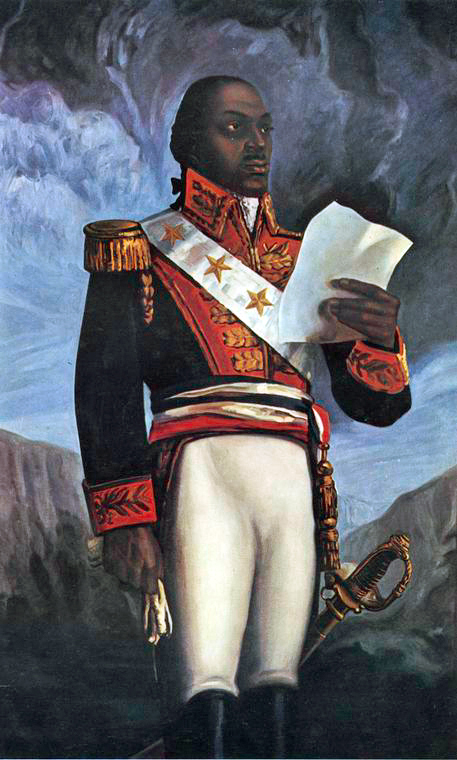
After his victory in the War of Knives, General Toussaint Louverture issued an invasion of Santo Domingo to secure French rule on the island. This would be the first Haitian invasion to Santo Domingo in the history of the island.

Under the Treaty of Basel, France returned to Spain the areas it had taken during the war in the Iberian Peninsula, and Spain in turn, ceded eastern Hispaniola to France. The information about the signing of the treaty became known in Santo Domingo on 18 October 1795, at a time when the Spanish were fighting against the French forces represented by Toussaint Louverture, who was trying to take Spanish Santo Domingo. The agreement is known as the Treaty of Basel, because it was signed on 22 July 1795, in the Swiss city of Basel.

On 27 January 1801, Toussaint Louverture, who had occupied Spanish Santo Domingo on behalf of France, issued a proclamation in which he invited the inhabitants of the city of Santo Domingo to return to their usual activities. He urged those who had left the island because of the occupation by Toussaint's troops to return to Santo Domingo. He addressed the message "to people of all colors." In this way, the military chief representing France tried to dispel the fears that worried the inhabitants of Santo Domingo. After the treaty came into force, large numbers of families, who were of Spanish origin, moved to Cuba and Puerto Rico. Those who went to Cuba suffered multiple difficulties because they did not receive the land and facilities that the colonial authorities promised to those who left Santo Domingo. For this reason, many requested in writing to the King of Spain that they be granted more than a year to leave Spanish Santo Domingo, but as soon as the occupation of Toussaint became a reality, they began to leave.

On 25 January 1801, Toussaint Louverture's forces defeated the Spanish forces, commanded by Governor Joaquín García y Moreno, in the area of the Nizao River. Toussaint had communicated his decision to occupy Spanish Santo Domingo to its Governor Joaquín García y Moreno, under the pretext of executing the Treaty of Basel, signed on 22 July 1795 by Spain and France, in Basel, Switzerland, to end the war they were waging. One version says that it was easy for Toussaint to impose himself on the Spanish, because the governor had 600 poorly armed men. Dominican historians who have studied the subject agree that in the area around the Nizao River, Toussaint's troops destroyed in combat the weak resistance that tried to oppose them. After the hostilities, Toussaint negotiated capitulation with Governor Joaquín García y Monero. The following day, 26 January 1801, the victorious troops marched to the city of Santo Domingo, which they took without resistance from the locals.

When the news reached Santo Domingo, the Spanish had managed to drive the French out of Bánica and Las Caobas, taking advantage of a British victory over Louverture's troops in Saint-Domingue. Toussaint took Spanish Santo Domingo on behalf of France in 1801, since the Treaty of Basel could not be executed earlier due to difficulties in applying it. The Treaty of Basel established that in exchange for the restitution of the territories conquered by the French in the North of the Iberian Peninsula, "the King of Spain, for himself and his successors, cedes and abandons all ownership to the French Republic of the entire Spanish part of the island of Santo Domingo in the Antilles." (sic) Under the Treaty of Basel, one month after the ratification of the agreement was announced on the island of Santo Domingo, "Spanish troops will be ready to evacuate the towns, ports and establishments they occupy here, to hand them over to French troops when they come to take possession of them." It provides that the squares, ports and establishments were to be handed over to the French with the cannons, war ammunition and necessary effects for their defence, which they had at the time when news of the negotiations became known.

When Toussaint announced his decision to occupy Santo Domingo on 6 January 1801, Governor Joaquín García Moreno argued that it was not possible because decisions by Napoleon and the Spanish Government were still pending, but that argument had no effect. The Treaty established that "the inhabitants of the Spanish part of Santo Domingo, who for their interests or other reasons prefer to transfer themselves and their assets to the possessions of His Catholic Majesty, may do so within one year from the date of this Treaty.”

=== Deposition of Toussaint and uprising of Camba Abajo and Camba Arriba: 1802 ===
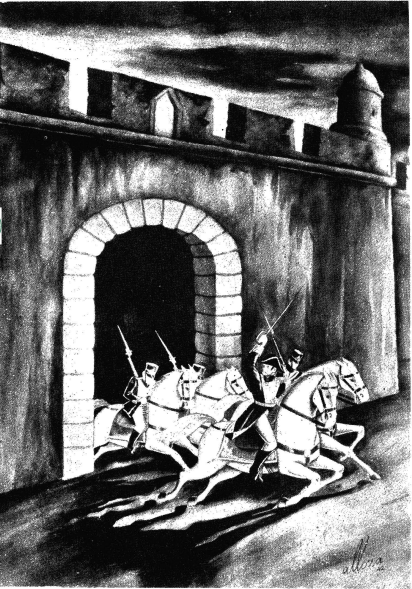
Juan Barón and his cavalry

A year later, in 1802, an invasion of the Napoleonic army led by Charles Leclerc gave way to a new French dominion of the Spanish part. Historian José Gabriel García described a fairly complex situation in which the Dominicans, according to their interests, sometimes took sides favor of Toussaint, others of France and, from 1804, against the Haitians. An illustrative example of this situation occurred at the beginning of 1802 when residents of the city of Santo Domingo organized under the direction of Juan Baron to assault the fort of San Gil and facilitate the French landing that sought to remove Toussaint from power. Other Dominican sectors who supported Toussaint denounced the movement. Toussaint's military in the Santo Domingo tried take advantage of the support of the black people in Santo Domingo and mobilized them in his favor. Garcia noted that: "Commander Marquis, who had the Haitians as chief in the stronghold of Haina, he made efforts to agitate the slaves of Los Ingenios, in order to increase their numbers and would allow him to become strong."

Perhaps as a result of these efforts, in that year of 1802, recently Once slavery was reestablished, there was an uprising of slaves in the Haciendas Camba Abajo and Camba Arriba in San Cristóbal, an area of sugar mills and haciendas, close to where the rebellion of Boca de Nigua had taken place five years earlier, once again, as a result of high concentration of slaves. The slaves of these estates took up arms and tried to join those of the Hacienda Fundacion. Some of those involved died in the persecution unleashed against them and others were eventually captured.22 This uprising closed the cycle of conspiracies and slave rebellions. Finally, the French were able to secure their dominance and the subjugation of the reinstated Dominican slaves.

=== Failed invasion from Haiti: 1805 ===
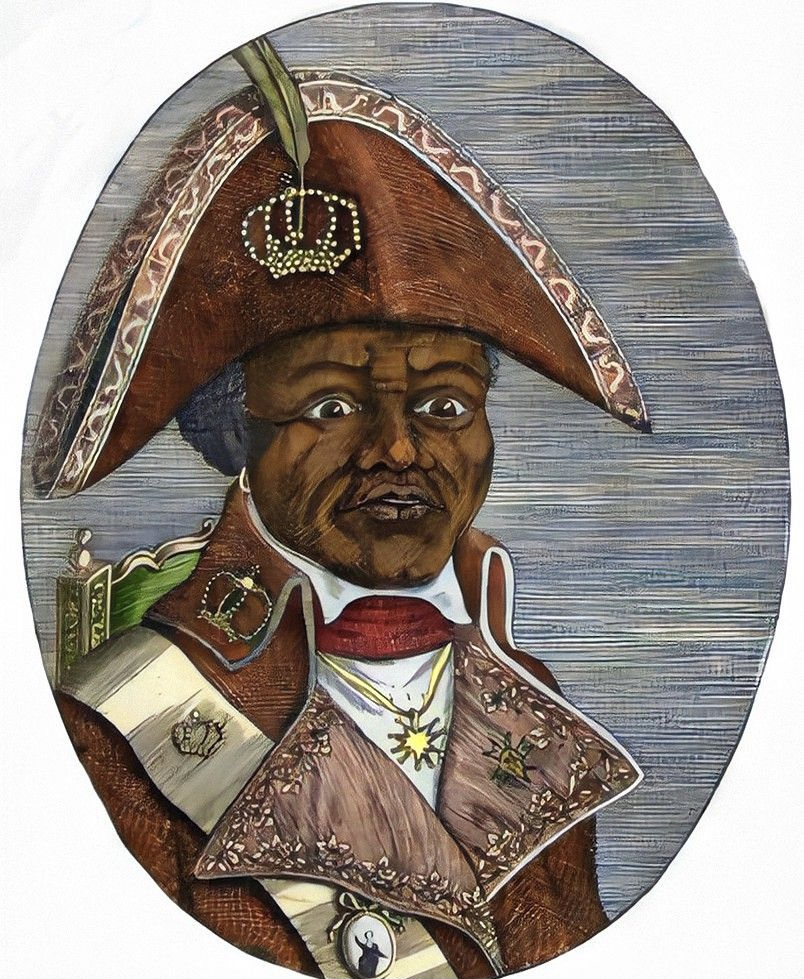
Having learned of the French presence in the eastern part of the island, Jean-Jacques Dessalines lead a campaign of 20,000 soldiers in an attempt to drive the French out.

In 1805, after crowning himself Emperor, Jean-Jacques Dessalines invaded, reaching Santo Domingo before retreating in the face of a French naval squadron. The Haitians fell back through the settled area of the interior, sacking the towns of Monte Plata, Cotui and La Vega, and slaughtering the citizens of Moca and Santiago. They left the fields laid waste, the cities ablaze and the churches in ashes behind them. In Moca only two people survived, thanks to corpses having been piled up on those still living in the church where the principal massacre took place.

=== Reconquest by Spain ===
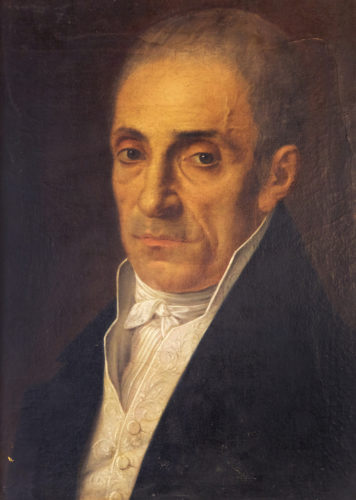
After a decade of French oppression, the Criollos of Santo Domingo led a revolution to restore Spanish domain in the colony. The most prominent leader of the movement was Juan Sánchez Ramírez.

The French invasion of Spain in March 1808 had great consequences throughout the Americas, and Santo Domingo was no exception, since in that same year various sectors proposed the separation of France and began to work to this. Such leaders included in the south and Cibao, under the initiative of Ciriaco Ramirez, and in the east, from the rancher Juan Sánchez Ramírez. During the War of Reconquest, there were important contacts between Dominican and Haitian leaders as Haiti had been divided into two parts in 1806: Alexandre Petion in the South and East Departments and Henri Christophe in the North. From Petion, the Dominicans received 40 boxes of cartridges, four thousand flint stones and one hundred halberds that were used by the men under the direction of Ciriaco Ramirez. On the other hand, negotiations were made with Cristobal who provided supplies in April 1809. These were brought by Brigadier Jose Campos Tavares who expressed that he wanted do this service to King Ferdinand VII"desiring for trade to be opened between the two colonies, regarding the peace and union that reigns between the Dominicans and the Haitians."

Sanchez Ramirez successfully led the Dominican troops against the French in the Battle of Palo Hincado and finally, after an extended siege of the city of Santo Domingo and significant assistance from British forces, in 1809 the French surrendered, ushering in the era of España Boba. The Reconquista did not reflect the unanimous feeling of the majority of Dominicans and in the first four years at least one conspiracy occurred annually and this points out the complexity of interests, influences and expectations of the moment. Santo Domingo would be de jure returned to Spain in the Treaty of Paris (1815). Ironically, the Dominicans had gone to war against the French to restore Spanish rule to Santo Domingo just as the rest of Hispanic America was preparing to renounce Spanish colonialism. Moreover, the so-called War of Reconquest, following two invasions by the Haitians, had left the colony completely devastated.

== Governors (1801–1809) ==
- 1801–1802 Toussaint Louverture
- 1802–1803 Antoine Nicolas Kerverseau
- 1803–1808 Jean-Louis Ferrand
- 1808–1809 Joseph-David de Barquier

== See also ==
- Devastations of Osorio
- Spanish reconquest of Santo Domingo
- Siege of Santo Domingo (1805)

== Notes ==
Chronology of Hispaniola
Previous	Current	Next
The slave rebellion begins in the French colony of Saint-Domingue	The Age of France in Spanish Santo Domingo	Spanish reconquest of Santo Domingo
