= España Boba =

Period of Spanish rule of the Dominican Republic (1809–1821)

Captaincy General of Santo Domingo Capitanía General de Santo Domingo
- 1809–1821
- Flag Coat of arms

- Status: Vassal state of Spain
- Capital: Santo Domingo
- Common languages: Spanish
- Demonym: Dominican
- Government: Monarchy
- King
  - 1813–1821: Ferdinand VII
- Governor
  - 1809–1811: Juan Sánchez Ramírez
  - 1811–1813: Manuel Caballero y Masot
  - 1813–1818: Carlos Luis de Urrutia
  - 1818–1821: Sebastián Kindelán y O'Regan
  - 1821: Pascual Real
- History
  - Ceded eastern portion to France: 22 July 1795
  - Dominicans declare independence from France and unite with Spain (Vassal State): 9 July 1809
  - Independence: 1 December 1821
- Currency: Santo Domingo real
Preceded by	Succeeded by
Era de Francia	Republic of Spanish Haiti
- Today part of: Dominican Republic; Haiti

In the history of the Dominican Republic, the period of España Boba (Spanish for "Foolish Spain") lasted from 9 July 1809 to 1 December 1821, during which the Captaincy General of Santo Domingo was under Spanish rule, but the Spanish government exercised minimal powers because its resources were attenuated by the Peninsular War and the various Spanish American wars of independence. The period ended when Dominican officials declared a short-lived independence on 30 November 1821. In February 1822, Haiti annexed former Santo Domingo, leading to an occupation that lasted until 1844.

== Background ==
Spanish Santo Domingo had been ceded to France as a result of the Peace of Basel in 1795. Many Dominicans chose to go into exile in Cuba, Puerto Rico and other Spanish areas. France, nevertheless, maintained only nominal control over the acquired area, with most of the colony's administration staffed by Dominicans and Spaniards and Spanish laws and traditions maintained. The situation turned worse when the declaration of an independent Haiti in 1804 increased hostilities on the island and commerce with the western part of the island was lost.

The start of the Peninsular War changed the political situation. Spain was now once again at war with France, although a French-appointed king, Joseph Bonaparte, tried to claim the allegiance of Spaniards everywhere. Exiled Dominicans who were opposed to the French began returning to the island and organized small expeditionary forces in Puerto Rico under Juan Sánchez Ramírez, which received British naval aid. Britain had never accepted the cessation of Santo Domingo to France, which it considered a violation of the Treaty of Utrecht. The Dominican and Puerto Rican forces defeated the smaller but better-armed French army on 7 November 1808, at the Battle of Palo Hincado.

== Spanish rule ==
During the next twelve years, Santo Domingo's economy suffered. Most farming was solely for subsistence, there was little specie on the island, and, once political stability returned to Spain in 1814, its focus was on the more productive island of Cuba.

However, during the second decade of the 19th century the colonial neglect acquired epic proportions. In fact, for all practical purposes, the colony in Santo Domingo during these years (1809–1821) was governed as an afterthought through the more significant Cuban administration. Cuba, in contrast with Santo Domingo, had ceased to be considered a marginal colony after the brief, yet consequential, British occupation of 1763. Spain had since been pouring resources into developing the Cuban economy, and so, while Santo Domingo was experiencing a loss of its white planter and landowning class, Cuba was welcoming a growing and enterprising bourgeoisie, which complemented the increasingly powerful sugar-planter class.

The Dominican colonial elite, on the other hand, had suffered substantially from the effects of the Haitian Revolution and did not recover. The ruling elite of the time lamented that they had been abandoned by Spain; little economic aid was invested in the island, the only money the royal government sent to the island was the salaries of royal employees. But while the growth of the sugar economy in Cuba created an economically and racially polarized society, in Santo Domingo the material gap among the social classes was not as marked.

=== Revolts against Spanish rule ===
As in the other Spanish colonies during the Peninsular War, there were several attempts to establish juntas, during the years 1809-1812. Some of these conspiracies attempted to create an independent state, while others sought to join the area to Haiti. An early attempt took place in 1809 under the leadership of a Habanero, simply known as "Don Fermín." He was arrested, held for seven years at Fort Ozama before being sent to Spain. Another conspiracy was headed by Manuel del Monte, a close relative of the royal commissioner sent by the Supreme Central and Governing Junta of the Kingdom, Francisco Javier Caro. Del Monte was discovered, arrested and indicted and sent to Spain, where he was acquitted, possibly due to the influence of his relative.

Four French sergeants who had remained after Spanish rule was restored attempted to organize a coup d'état to return Santo Domingo to French rule. Their effort failed and they were executed. Also executed were the leaders of an attempted slave and free black revolt. When the authorities refused to consider freeing the Dominican slaves, as had been hoped, or fully implementing the Spanish Constitution of 1812, which would have granted Spanish nationality to free blacks, if not granting them the right to vote, slaves and free blacks conspired to end slavery and to join the region to Haiti. The conspiracy was discovered and many were sentenced to lashes and jail terms. The four principal leaders, Pedro Seda, José Leocadio, Pedro Henríquez and a person simply known as Marcos were executed. Their heads were publicly displayed at various points of the capital.

== Independence of Santo Domingo ==
As the Spanish authorities showed little interest in their restored colony, the great ranching families such as the Santanas came to be the leaders in the south east, and the law of the "machete" ruled for a time. Then on 9 November 1821 the Spanish colony of Santo Domingo was toppled by a group led by Spanish lieutenant governor Núñez de Cáceres, the colony's former administrator, and the rebels proclaimed independence from Spain on 30 November 1821. The new nation was known as Republic of Spanish Haiti. On 1 December 1821 a constitutive act was ordered to petition the union of Spanish Haiti with Simon Bolivar’s Gran Colombia.

== Ephemeral independence ==
In November 1821 a new conspiracy emerged in the mountainous region bordering Haiti to join Santo Domingo to Haiti. The conspiracy was popular among the middle and lower classes, small shop keepers, a few key ranchers, and among Criollos and Mulattoes. The movement spread in the Sur and Cibao regions. At the same time another conspiracy in the capital, headed by José Núñez de Cáceres sought to free Santo Domingo and join it to Gran Colombia. Realizing that the pro-Haiti movement was gaining ground, he and his followers deposed Governor Pascual Real on 30 November 1821, and established the Independent State of Spanish Haiti. The new state had little support in the other regions of Santo Domingo and Núñez de Cáceres was unable to secure a commitment from Simón Bolívar that Gran Colombia would send aid. Haitian President Jean-Pierre Boyer wrote to Núñez de Cáceres expressing the importance that the island be united. Núñez de Cáceres subsequently saw no other option than to place Santo Domingo under Haitian rule. Nine weeks later on 9 February 1822, Boyer took formal possession of Santo Domingo and occupied the whole island. This was the beginning of a 22-year occupation by Haitian forces.

== Governors and captain generals ==
- Juan Sánchez Ramírez (1809–1811)
- Manuel Caballero y Masot 1811–1813
- Carlos Luis de Urrutia (1813–1818)
- Sebastián Kindelán (1818–1821)
- Pascual Real (1821)

== See also ==
- José Núñez de Cáceres
- 1812 Mendoza and Mojarra Conspiracy
- Republic of Spanish Haiti

Chronology of Hispaniola
Previous	Current	Next
The Era of France in Santo Domingo	The España Boba period (1809–1821)	The Ephemeral Independence (December 1, 1821 – February 9, 1822)
