= Carlos Luis de Urrutia =

Spanish military commander and colonial administrator

Carlos Luis de Urrutia (1750-1825) was a Spanish military commander and colonial administrator. He played an important part in suppressing the Mexican insurrection of Miguel Hidalgo, and was rewarded with the appointment of Governor of Santo Domingo (1813-1818) and then supreme military commander of Guatemala (1818-1821). When the latter declared independence, he fled to Cuba.
