= Joseph-David de Barquier =

French general; 71st governor of Santo Domingo (1808–1809)

Joseph-David de Barquier (June 7, 1757 – October 31, 1844) was a French commander from the French Revolution. He would later take part in the affairs of the island of Hispaniola. The two occupying colonies of Saint-Domingue and Santo Domingo would each undergo their own revolutions against France: the Haitian Revolution and the Spanish reconquest of Santo Domingo. As successor of Jean-Louis Ferrand, he continued the fight against Dominican insurgents under Juan Sánchez Ramírez in the latter conflict. But with the aid of British forces in Jamaica, the rebels defeated France, leaving de Barquier with no choice but to capitulate in 1809.

== Biography ==
He was born in Antibes, France on June 7, 1757.

Having entered the service as a Second lieutenant in the 1st Cavalry Regiment in December 1779, he became lieutenant in 1791 and then captain in 1792. Appointed Aide-de-camp to the General-Prince of Hesse, decorated with the Cross of Saint-Louis in June 1792, in July 1792, he became Lieutenant colonel in September, and he was promoted to Adjutant-general in February 1793. In the Army of Italy in March 1793, he served in the Macquart division on March 30, 1793, participated in the Battle of Saorge on April 28, 1794. He was wounded by a shell fragment at the La Rocavion affair in the Col de Tende expedition on August 7, 1794.

Reformed on June 7, 1795, he was member of the board of directors of the Perpignan hospital in May 1800, then of that of Rennes.

Having joined the army in Santo Domingo as head of the general administration of hospitals, he was promoted to provisional Brigadier general on April 18, 1802. He served as commander at Tortuga Island in November, then in the Clauzel division in December. He then joined the western part of the island. He commanded at the Saint-Nicolas mole and seized the port and fort of Jean-Rabel. After the rout, he received in 1804 the command of the 1st division, strong of 2,000 French soldiers under the orders of General Jean-Louis Ferrand. He was wounded in the defense of the city of Santo Domingo against an army of 20,000 soldiers of Jean-Jacques Dessalines on March 11, 1805, which was besieging the fortress of Santo Domingo.

He then faced the Spanish insurrection of 1808 in Santo Domingo. About 700 French were defeated on November 7, 1808, at the Battle of Palo Hincado. General Jean-Louis Ferrand committed suicide, his Spanish militias having mutinied in the middle of the fight. Joseph-David de Barquier then took command of the Eastern Division of Santo Domingo and resisted during an 8-month siege in the capital's fortress. He was soon deprived of all communication with the metropolis and of all internal assistance, the city being invested by a Spanish army corps under General Juan Sánchez Ramírez.

In July 1809, an English squadron commanded by General Hugh Lyle Carmichael left Jamaica to lend support to the Spanish General Joseph Arala against the French. General Barquier proposed on July 4 a capitulation, by virtue of which the garrison left with the honours of war", which took effect on July 7. The officers were sent to France and the soldiers to England.

Decorated with the Legion of Honor on August 24, 1810, later employed in the military division, in Tuscany (Arno department) from 1811, then in the Ombrone department from 1812 to 1814; he retired on September 9, 1815, after 21 years and 4 months of service.

He was made an officer of the Legion of Honor on May 8, 1835.

He died on October 31, 1844, at age 87.

== See also ==
- Jean-Louis Ferrand
- Juan Sánchez Ramírez
- Spanish reconquest of Santo Domingo

== Sources ==
- Georges Six: Biographical dictionary of French generals and admirals of the Revolution and the Empire, Georges Saffroy historical and noble bookstore, 1934 (volume 1).
- Rabbe, Vieilh de Boisjolin and Saint-Preuve: Historical dictionary of living and dead men from 1788 to the present day, Volume V, 1836, Paris.
- Cote LH/119/2 [ archive ] ”, Léonore database, French Ministry of Culture
