= Jean-Louis Ferrand =

French Army officer and colonial administrator (1803–1808)

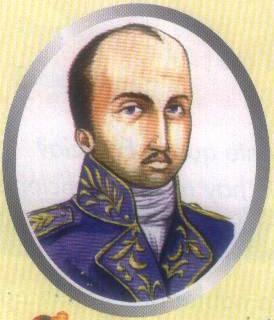

Governor of Santo Domingo
- In office 1803 – November 7, 1808
- Preceded by: Antoine Nicolas Kerverseau
- Succeeded by: Joseph-David de Barquier

Personal details
- Born: December 13, 1758 Besançon, France
- Died: November 7, 1808 (aged 49) El Seibo, Captaincy General of Santo Domingo
- Awards: Legion of Honor

Military service
- Allegiance: France
- Branch/service: French Army
- Years of service: 1770s–1808
- Rank: General
- Battles/wars: American Revolutionary War; French Revolutionary Wars; Haitian Revolution; Saint-Domingue expedition; Napoleonic Wars; Caribbean campaign of 1803–1810; Spanish reconquest of Santo Domingo

Jean-Louis Ferrand (December 13, 1758 – November 7, 1808) was a French Army officer and colonial administrator who served as the governor of Santo Domingo from 1803 to 1808. Serving in the American Revolutionary War and French Revolutionary and Napoleonic Wars, he joined the Saint-Domingue expedition in 1801, which unsuccessfully attempted to restore French rule and slavery in the colony of Saint-Domingue. Unwilling to capitulate to the Indigenous Army, Ferrand retreated into the neighboring Captaincy General of Santo Domingo in 1803 and began serving as its governor, successfully resisting a Haitian invasion in 1805. By 1808, the Peninsular War led to an anti-French revolt breaking out in Santo Domingo, and Ferrand committed suicide during the Battle of Palo Hincado, bringing an end to French rule in the colony.

== Early life ==
Jean-Louis Ferrand was born on December 13, 1753 in Besançon, France. Joining the Royal Army during the 1770s, he participated in the American Revolutionary War before joining the newly-formed Revolutionary Army in the 1790s and seeing action in several campaigns of the French Revolutionary Wars. In 1801, Ferrand was sent to the colony of Saint-Domingue as part of an expedition under General Charles Leclerc intended to restore French rule and slavery there. By 1803, the French were on the verge of defeat by the Indigenous Army, and Ferrand retreating into the Captaincy General of Santo Domingo (which Leclerc's troops had occupied in 1802) instead of capitulating. This preserved Santo Domingo's status as a French colony even after Saint-Domingue declared independence as the First Empire of Haiti.

== Governor of Santo Domingo ==
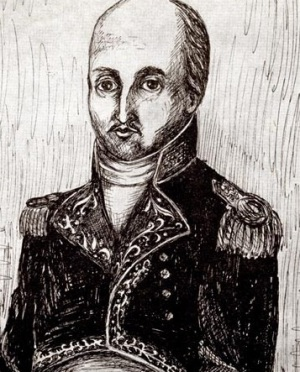
Illustration of Ferrand

From 1803 to 1808, Ferrand served as the governor of Santo Domingo, establishing a paternalist regime which as a result of a decree issued by Napoleon respected Spanish customs and practises, including existing laws and the institution of slavery. Although there was a degree of collaboration between the Spanish colonists and the French, Ferrand avoided being overly draconian in his rule to prevent the outbreak of a revolt. He implemented several economic measures during his tenure as governor, including prohibiting all trade with Haitians, encouraging the harvest of precious woods, especially mahogany, promoting agricultural pursuits such as the production of sugarcane, and declaring Santo Domingo's ports to be free ports in order to encourage trade with foreign nations such as the United States. Ferrand also ordered French troops to be stationed near the border with Haiti and encouraged Haitians to be hunted and captured in order to be sold into slavery.

== Death ==
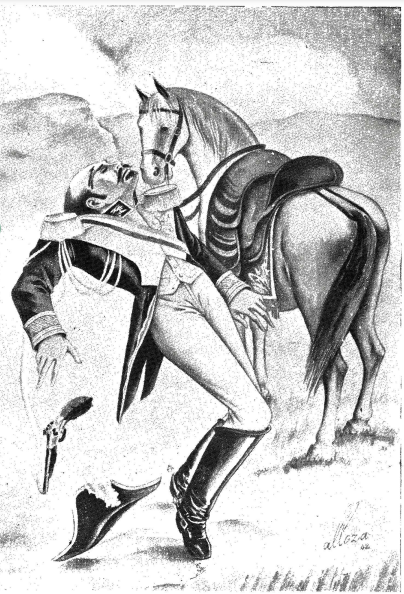
Illustration of General Louis Ferrand committing suicide by José Alloza c. 1979

Louis Ferrand endured the reprisal of Jean-Jacques Dessalines in 1805; after which a new uprising forced him to accept a battle in which he was completely defeated by Dominican forces under Juan Sanchez Ramirez in the Battle of Palo Hincado, which led him to commit suicide in 1808.

== Honors and recognition ==
The Montboucons fort in Besançon is named after Boulanger de Ferrand in his honour.

He posthumously received the Legion of Honor.

== See also ==
- French Revolution
- Saint-Domingue expedition
- Siege of Santo Domingo (1805)
- Spanish reconquest of Santo Domingo
- Juan Sánchez Ramírez

== Bibliography ==
- Jean-Louis Ferrand, dans Charles Mullié, Biographie des célébrités militaires des armées de terre et de mer de 1789 à 1850, 1852 [détail de l’édition]
- Adélaïde-Merlande, Jacques (2000). Histoire générale des Antilles et des Guyanes - des Pre-Columbians à nos jours. L'Harmattan. ISBN 978-2-738429-72-8.
