= Siege of Santo Domingo (1805) =

1805 battle of the Franco-Haitian War

- Part of the Franco-Haitian War
Date	February–April 1805
Location	City of Santo Domingo, Spanish Santo Domingo under french control 18°28′35″N 69°53′36″W
Result	French victory: Beheadings of Moca

Belligerents
France	Haiti

Commanders and leaders
Jean-Louis Ferrand	Jean-Jacques Dessalines; Henri Christophe

Strength
2,000 regulars 6 frigates	21,000 regulars and militia

Casualties and losses
Unknown	Unknown
- Location within the Dominican Republic Siege of Santo Domingo (1805) (the Caribbean)

The siege of Santo Domingo was a major battle of the Franco-Haitian War and was fought in March 1805 at Santo Domingo, Saint-Domingue. A force of some 2,000 French Army troops led by Gen. Jean-Louis Ferrand resisted a siege of three weeks by a force of 21,000 Haitian Army troops led by Emperor Jacques I. The siege lasted until the city received naval support from six French Navy frigates.

== The siege ==
Victorious in an engagement on the Yaque river, Dessalines laid siege to the capital on March 5, 1805. In the meantime his lieutenant, Henri Christophe, overran the Cibao, sacking the towns and committing horrors. Santiago was captured before the inhabitants had time to flee, and a large number were murdered by the invaders. The members of the municipal council were hung, naked, on the balcony of the city hall; the people who had sought refuge in the main church were put to the sword and their bodies mutilated; and the priest was burnt alive in the church, the furniture of the edifice constituting his funeral pyre.

The city of Santo Domingo had been placed in a state of defense and artillery mounted on the tower of Mercedes church and the roofs of the San Francisco and Jesuit churches. The garrison consisted of some 2,000 men, but to maintain these and the 6,000 inhabitants of the city as well as the refugees there were only limited supplies on hand. Food quickly ran low when, providentially, a French fleet appeared before the city. The admiral, who thought the entire island abandoned by the French, was delighted to find the French flag still flying and gladly rendered assistance. A desperate sortie was made on March 28, the twenty—third day of the siege, with such success that Dessalines precipitately retired, abandoning his stores. The main body of the Haitians retreated by way of the Cibao, the others through the south, all devastating the country as far as they could. Azua, San Jose de las Matas, Monte Plata, Cotui, San Francisco de Macoris, La Vega, Santiago and Monte Cristi were reduced to ashes. In Moca, 500 inhabitants deceived by the promises of Christophe, returned from their hiding places in the hills and assembled for divine service in the parish church, where they were summarily executed. In La Vega and Santiago the Haitian troops made prisoners of numerous families, aggregating 900 persons among men, women and children in La Vega and probably more in Santiago, and forced them to accompany the army to northern Haiti, where they were kept in captivity, working practically as slaves for their captors, for four years. The march was full of horrors for the prisoners, who were prohibited from wearing hats or shoes and were brutally treated by their guards.
