= Battle of Palo Hincado =

1808 battle of the Spanish reconquest of Santo Domingo

- Part of Caribbean campaign of 1803–1810 and the Spanish reconquest of Santo Domingo
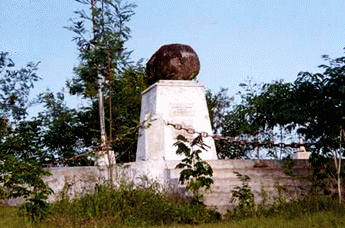
- The Battle of Palo Hincado Monument in the Dominican Republic.
Date	November 7, 1808; 215 years ago
Location	Near El Seibo, Captaincy General of Santo Domingo 18°46′10″N 69°03′59″W
Result	Spanish victory

Belligerents
Santo Domingo	France

Commanders and leaders
Juan Sánchez Ramírez	Jean-Louis Ferrand †

Strength
1,800	500

Casualties and losses
52 killed and wounded	400 killed, wounded and captured

The Battle of Palo Hincado (Palo Hincado Stands for "Kneeling Stick") was the first major battle of the Spanish reconquest of Santo Domingo of the Spanish colonial Captaincy General of Santo Domingo, that was occupied by the French in the Spanish West Indies. The site is in the present-day Dominican Republic, on the island of Hispaniola in the Caribbean.

The battle was fought on November 7, 1808, at Palo Hincado savanna, near El Seibo in the colony of Santo Domingo. A force of 1,800 pro-Spanish Dominican troops, led by General Juan Sánchez Ramírez, defeated a force of 500 troops of French Army of Napoleon, led by Governor General Jean-Louis Ferrand.

== Preparations ==
In 1808, Juan Sánchez Ramírez was the commander in the east of Hispaniola, while Ciriaco Ramírez and Cristóbal Huber Franco were the commanders in the south and Capt. Diego Polanco was the commander of Santiago de los Caballeros and the Cibao/North region. The "Milicias Españolas" (Spanish Army) was under the command of Capt Tomás Ramírez Carvajal.

They were backed by the Spanish Royal Governor of colonial Puerto Rico, General Toribio Montes. Ramírez sent a letter via a Spanish ship anchored in Samana on September 17 to Governor Montes. On November 28 the Spanish schooner "Monserrate" arrived in Puerto Rico from Macao with the news that the supply aid requested by Ramírez would soon reach Montes.

With this encouragement General Ramírez redoubled efforts—while French Governor General Ferrand was preparing to quell the impending rebellion. It was easy for Ramírez take possession of the town of El Seibo on Oct. 26, 1808.

With their positions quickly forming, twenty nine soldiers, including General Ramírez, reached the port at the mouth of the river at Boca de Yuma to receive the military aid sent from Puerto Rico by Governor Montes. The war materials had been shipped in the brig Frederick and schooner Render and consisted of a gunboat, four rifles with bayonets, a hundred sabers, and corresponding ammunition. In addition, two hundred volunteers arrived, mostly Creole emigrants. The brig and schooner then left the Port of Higuey to return to Puerto Rico.

At that time, General Ramírez received the news that Governor General Ferrand was directed towards El Seibo with a respectable force, and determined to master the revolt. The timing was bad for the revolutionaries. He urged taking the French garrison at Samaná (Sabana de la Mar) for making a stronghold, because without the possession of this port the Reconquista forces could fail. Ramírez took note of the presence of allied British warships off the Santo Domingo coastline, and dispatched a messenger to Charles Dashwood who was commanding the frigate HMS Franchise. Dashwood agreed to attack the French garrison at Samaná, and informed Ramírez that he could count on the cooperation of the Commander of Arms for Samaná, Diego de Lira, who had become committed to the Reconquista cause.

Of those who landed in Boca de Yuma/Port of Higuey from Puerto Rico, the only true military leader among them was Lieutenant Francisco Diaz. He joined the forces of General Ramírez. As one of the few reconquistadores that had knowledge of war tactics, Ramírez was entrusted to direct the transfer of weapons and baggage to El Seibo from the port. Then Diaz was in charge of organizing the conflict's meeting site, the enlistment of weapons, and choosing the most advantageous position to wait out the approaching enemy. After a study of the whole area, Diaz chose the site of Magarín.

On the morning of November 3, Lieutenant Diaz began organizing and distributing arms and ammunition to his forces at the Port of Higuey in Boca de Yuma. Very early the troops gathered in front of the Shrine of Our Lady of Altagracia and heard mass. After the ceremony they received the news that Governor Ferrand and the French were very close to El Seibo. General Ramírez gave the order to march westward to meet the enemy.

November 5 dawned on Lieutenant Diaz in El Seibo. Here he continued organizing and incorporating the new volunteers into his Spanish 'makeshift army.' The preparation and distribution of arms and ammunition was also in charge of Lieutenant Diaz.

That night General Ramírez had "a terrible vision of French Governor General Ferrand's emissary", who it was announced that the battle would go overwhelmingly in favor of the French in El Seibo on the 7th. Through Ferrand's envisioned emissary, Ramirez 'replied,' letting him know his forces were prepared to measure their strength against the French. "To the emissary of Napoleon's forces these intentions sounded like a bluff, and the envisioned Ferrand could not help but smile."

The weapons and tactical superiority of the French forces looked to easily beat the Spanish, who were untrained and poorly armed. Ferrand ignored the real warnings that Ramírez's forces were not to be underestimated, especially in their deft handling of the knife, and happily prepared to give battle.

== Battle of Palo Hincado ==
On November 6, General Ramírez and the troops moved up to the strategic position of Magarín, well chosen by Lieutenant Díaz. Here a temporary hut held the few tough firearms and ammunition at their disposal. The site at Palo Hincado savanna was half a league west of the town of El Seibo. General Ramírez issued orders to wait for the enemy advance.

Lieutenant Díaz resolved to take on preparatory measures himself on the night of November 6, before the morning date announced by Governor General Ferrand for French entry into El Seibo. The rain did not stop during the night, with adverse consequences. In the early morning of November 7, it cleared however. General Ramírez and Lieutenant Díaz provided guns with dry amunicionar ammunition and bayonets, for the foot and horsemen troops. They were all reconquistadores ready "to fight with fury and rage Napoleon's infesting the 'Prime of the Indies' for the infamy of the Spanish Crown."

The reconquistadores reached Palo Hincado between nine and ten o'clock. Lieutenant Francisco Díaz was in position at the top of the savanna, in front of the nearly three hundred soldiers carrying rifles. Located in the center of his army, on the eminence above, General Ramírez distributing orders to his troops. He placed on his right Manuel Carvajal, and his left Pedro Vásquez. Miguel Febles served as adjutant. The "Milicias Españolas" (Spanish Army) was under the command of Capt Tomás Ramírez Carvajal.

From the eminence above General Ramírez gave a speech to the troops. He warned that their action would be decisive, since coming to the front of the French enemy with their governor's cream of the forces at his disposal, whose defeat would mean the triumph of the Reconquista campaign. Ramírez recommended assault with their knives after the first shot was spent, to avoid the response of the best tactical rifle the French used. He ended the speech announcing that he ordered the death penalty, to shoot any retreating Spanish soldier, even himself. In this way everyone was forced to realize that it was better to die fighting than by being dishonorably shot. His final exclamation was "long live Fernando VII, a Prince personified in those moments the best Spanish hopes."

The General's speech was followed by tense moments of silence and attention. The French advanced and opened fire at about noon. A Gallic horse line pounced left to cut the Spanish forces off. Riders led by Captain Antonio Sosa wasted no time and ran to meet them, forcing the attackers to pull in the flanges.

Among many other provisions, José de la Rosa was to ambush thirty riflemen at the rear of the enemy to distract attention after the fire broke out front. De la Rosa was one of those who came to Boca de Yuma on October 29 from Puerto Rico. The first shock was bloody melee.

General Ramírez gave the cavalry of his right wing, led by Captain Vicente Mercedes, the order to advance, an operation that was executed very quickly, overwhelming the French enemy. Ten minutes of fighting enough for the field covered with corpses remain.

The tactic of Spanish forces was to quickly capture the distance of duel shot in combat. They executed with such alacrity and boldness that they lost only seven, while the French casualties were heavy.

Among the Spanish who died were the two cavalry units leaders, Cpt. Antonio Sosa and Cpt. Vicente Mercedes. They are both buried in El Seibo.

The Battle of Palo Hincado concluded on November 7, 1808—with a Spanish victory over the Napoleonic French.

== Aftermath ==
With the displayed waste of their battalions, French Governor General Ferrand ordered a hasty return to the city of Santo Domingo with a group of surviving officers. They were chased by a squadron commanded by Spanish Colonel Pedro Santana, namesake of the future leader of the Republic. The French escaped by crossing a torrential river, that the squadron was unable to follow. The French stopped to rest in Glen Guaiquía. Meanwhile, it was here the unhappy Governor Ferrand, dominated by depression, took his own life with a pistol shot to the head.

The Junta of Bondillo ("La Junta de Bondillo), presided by commander of Santiago de los Caballeros and Cibao troops Capt. Don Diego Polanco, was formed to appoint as acting governor Sanchez Ramirez and to recognize King Ferdinand VII as sovereign of the colony conquered.

Symbolism

"This became the third major war event symbolizing "the triumph of Dominican will." The first had been the siege in 1655, and the second had been the Battle of the Sabana Real in 1691."

There is a monument at the battle site in the Dominican Republic.

== See also ==
- Spanish reconquest of Santo Domingo
- West Indies Campaign 1804–10

== Bibliography ==
- Clodfelter, M. (2017). Warfare and Armed Conflicts: A Statistical Encyclopedia of Casualty and Other Figures, 1492-2015 (4th ed.). Jefferson, North Carolina: McFarland. ISBN 978-0786474707.
