= List of colonial governors of Santo Domingo =

== First Spanish Captaincy 1492–1801 ==
=== Governors and Viceroys of the Indies ===
- 1492–1500 Admiral Christopher Columbus, as Viceroy of the Indies
- 1496–1498 Bartolomeo Columbus, as Adelantado
- 1500–1502 Comendador Francisco de Bobadilla, as Governor of the Indies
- 1502–1509 Comendador Frey Nicolás de Ovando y Cáceres, as Governor of the Indies
- 1509–1518 Second Admiral Diego Columbus, as Governor of the Indies until 1511, and as Viceroy of the Indies until his death in 1526, when the title went to his son Luis Colón, who perpetually resigned it to the Spanish Crown in 1536
- 1515–1516 Licentiate Cristóbal Lebrón, in connection with Royal Audiencia
- 1516–1519 Luis de Figueroa, Bernardino de Manzanedo, and Ildefonso de Santo Domingo, friars of the order of San Jerónimo
- 1519–1520 Licentiate Rodrigo de Figueroa
- 1520–1524 Second Admiral Diego Columbus
- 1524–1528 Royal Audiencia, in connection with judges Gaspar de Espinosa and Alonso de Zuazo

=== Governors and Captains-General ===
- 1528–1531 Sebastián Ramírez de Fuenleal, Bishop of Santo Domingo and Concepción de la Vega
- 1531–1533 Alonso de Zuazo and the Royal Audiencia
- 1533–1540 Licentiate Alonso de Fuenmayor, Bishop of Santo Domingo and Concepción de la Vega
- 1540–1543 Third Admiral Luis Colón, 1st Duke of Veragua
- 1543–1549 Licentiate Alonso López de Cerrato
- 1549–1556 Licentiate Alonso de Fuenmayor, Archbishop of Santo Domingo
- 1556–1558 Licentiate Alonso de Maldonado
- 1558–1560 Licentiate Juan López Cepeda
- 1560–1561 Juan Echagoyan
- 1561–1564 Alonso Arias de Herrera
- 1564–1565 Antonio de Osorio
- 1565–1567 Alonso de Grajeda
- 1567–1568 Licentiate Diego de Vera
- 1568–1572 Antonio de Mexia
- 1572–1576 Francisco de Vera
- 1576–1581 Gregorio González de Cuenca
- 1581–1583 Licentiate Arceo
- 1583–1587 Licentiate Cristóbal de Ovalle
- 1590–1597 Lope de Vega Portocarrero
- 1597–1601 Diego de Osorio
- 1601–1608 Antonio de Osorio
- 1608–1624 Diego Gómez de Sandoval
- 1624–1634 Diego de Acuña
- 1634–1646 Maestre de Campo Juan Bitrián de Viamonte
- 1646–1649 Nicolás Velasco Altamirano
- 1649–1652 Maestre de Campo Gabriel de Chaves Osorio
- 1652–1657 Bernardino Meneses y Bracamonte, Count of Peñalba
- 1657–1658 Félix de Zúñiga y Avellaneda
- 1658–1660 Andrés Pérez Franco
- 1660–1662 Juan Francisco de Montemayor Córdoba y Cuenca
- 1662–1670 Juan de Balboa y Mogrovejo
- 1670–1671 Pedro de Carvajal y Cobos
- 1671–1677 Maestre de Campo Ignacio de Zayas Bazán
- 1677–1679 Dr. Juan de Padilla Guardiola y Guzmán
- 1679–1684 Maestre de Campo Francisco de Segura Sandoval y Castilla
- 1684–1689 Maestre de Campo Andrés de Robles
- 1689–1698 Admiral Ignacio Pérez Caro
- 1698–1699 Maestre de Campo Gil Correoso Catalán
- 1699–1702 Severino de Manzaneda
- 1702–1706 Admiral Ignacio Pérez Caro
- 1706–1707 Licentiate Sebastián de Cerezada y Girón
- 1707–1713 Guillermo Morfi
- 1713–1714 Brigadier Pedro de Niela y Torres
- 1714–1715 Colonel Antonio Landeche
- 1715–1723 Brigadier Fernando Constanzo y Ramírez, Knight of Santiago
- 1723–1732 Colonel Francisco de la Rocha y Ferrer
- 1732–1739 Brigadier Alfonso de Castro y Mazo
- 1739–1750 Brigadier Pedro Zorrilla y de San Martín, Marquis of la Gándara Real
- 1750 Brigadier Juan José Colomo
- 1750–1751 Lieutenant Rey José de Zunnier de Basteros
- 1751–1759 Brigadier Francisco Rubio y Peñaranda
- 1759–1771 Field-Marshal Manuel de Azlor y Urries
- 1771–1779 Brigadier José Solano y Bote
- 1779–1785 Brigadier Isidoro de Peralta y Rojas
- 1785–1786 Colonel Joaquín García y Moreno
- 1786–1788 Brigadier Manuel González de Torres
- 1788–1801 Brigadier Joaquín García y Moreno

== French Captaincy 1801–1809 ==
=== Governors ===
- 1801–1802 General Toussaint Louverture
- 1802–1803 General Antoine Nicolas Kerverseau
- 1803–1808 General Jean-Louis Ferrand
- 1808–1809 General Joseph-David de Barquier

== Second Spanish Captaincy 1809–1821 ==
=== Governors and Captains-General ===
- 1809–1811 Brigadier Juan Sánchez Ramírez
- 1811–1813 Colonel Manuel Caballero y Masot
- 1813–1818 Brigadier Carlos de Urrutia y Matos
- 1818–1821 Brigadier Sebastián Kindelán y O´Regan
- 1821 Brigadier Pascual Real

== Spanish Province 1861–1865 ==
=== Governors and Captains-General ===
- 1861–1862 Lieutenant-General Pedro Santana
- 1862–1863 Lieutenant-General Felipe Rivero y Lemoine
- 1863–1864 Brigadier Carlos de Vargas
- 1864–1865 Lieutenant-General José de la Gándara y Navarro

== See also ==
- Captaincy General of Santo Domingo
  - Real Audiencia of Santo Domingo
- History of the Dominican Republic

== Sources ==
- (in Spanish) Gobernadores Isla de Santa Domingo
