= Juan Sánchez Ramírez =

Dominican military commander; 72nd governor of Santo Domingo (1808–1811)

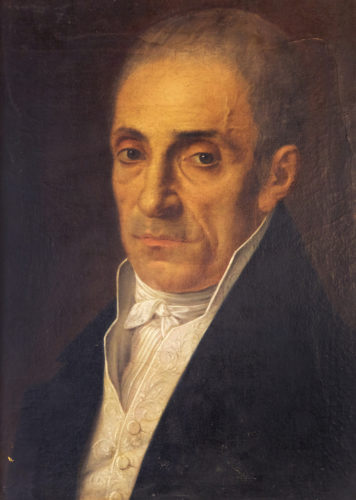
- Portrait of Governor Juan Sánchez Ramírez. Work by Luis Desangles

72nd Governor of the Spanish Colony of Santo Domingo (1809–1821)
- In office December 13, 1808 – February 11, 1811
- Preceded by: Joseph-David de Barquier
- Succeeded by: Manuel Caballero y Masot

Personal details
- Born: 1762 Cotuí, Captaincy General of Santo Domingo
- Died: February 11, 1811 (aged 48–49) Santo Domingo, Captaincy General of Santo Domingo
- Resting place: National Pantheon of the Dominican Republic
- Spouse: Josefa del Monte y Pichardo
- Children: 2
- Parent(s): Francisca Ramírez and Miguel Sánchez
- Occupation: Planter, politician and military commander
- Profession: Politician and Captain general

Military service
- Allegiance: Great Britain; Dominican Republic; Spain
- Branch/service: Dominican Army; Spanish Army
- Years of service: 1793–1811
- Rank: Captain general
- Battles/wars: War of the First Coalition; War of the Pyrenees; Reconquest of Santo Domingo; Battle of Palo Hincado; Siege of Santo Domingo

Juan Sánchez Ramírez (1762 – February 11, 1811) was a Dominican general who was the primary leader of the War of Reconquista. He is known for leading the troops in the Battle of Palo Hincado. The decisive Dominican victory resulted in the end of French rule in eastern Hispaniola in 1809. He was the first Dominican to serve as governor of Santo Domingo.

In 1795, the island of Santo Domingo ceased to be linked to Spain by the Peace Treaty of Basel (Switzerland), which put an end to the War of the Convention (1793–1795), by which it passed under French rule. In 1808, after Napoleon invaded Spain, the La Reconquista movement was created on the island, led, among others, by Sánchez Ramírez, with the aim of returning to Spanish rule.

Sánchez Ramírez, an agricultural landowner of Criollo origin, had already fought against the French in the War of the Convention, and in 1803 he had emigrated to Puerto Rico, from where he returned in 1807 to foment the insurrection. To do this, he requested the help of the governor of Puerto Rico, Toribio Montes, and of Dominican settlers who had fled to that island, with whose forces he revolted against the French troops of general and governor Jean-Louis Ferrand, whom he defeated on November 7, 1808 in the historical Battle of Palo Hincado. Shortly after, with the help of the English fleet sent by Hugh Lyle Carmichael that came to support him from Jamaica, he managed to take the capital of the island. He was therefore appointed captain general and mayor of the island by the Junta of Seville, thereby reestablishing Spanish sovereignty.

During his government he harshly repressed any independence attempt, acting with total impunity in the face of the indifference of the Spanish metropolis. He maintained this position until his death in 1811, afterwards the colony attained its independence from Spain in 1821.

== Biography ==
=== Early years ===
Juan Sánchez Ramírez was born in 1762 in Cotuí, Santo Domingo. According to historian Francisco A. Rincón, he was the son of Miguel Sánchez and Francisca Ramírez. Juan Sánchez Ramírez had two brothers: Remigio and Rafael. The last of them was Magistrate of Cotuí in the Haitian period of the Dominican Republic. His father was a Spanish member of the military and a wealthy landowner. However, it was the priest Pichardo y Delmonte who took care of his education. When he was young, he led a company of lancers of Cotuí.

Ramírez held several significant positions in Cotuí, including that of magistrate.

=== 1793–1795: War of Convention and Treaty of Basel ===
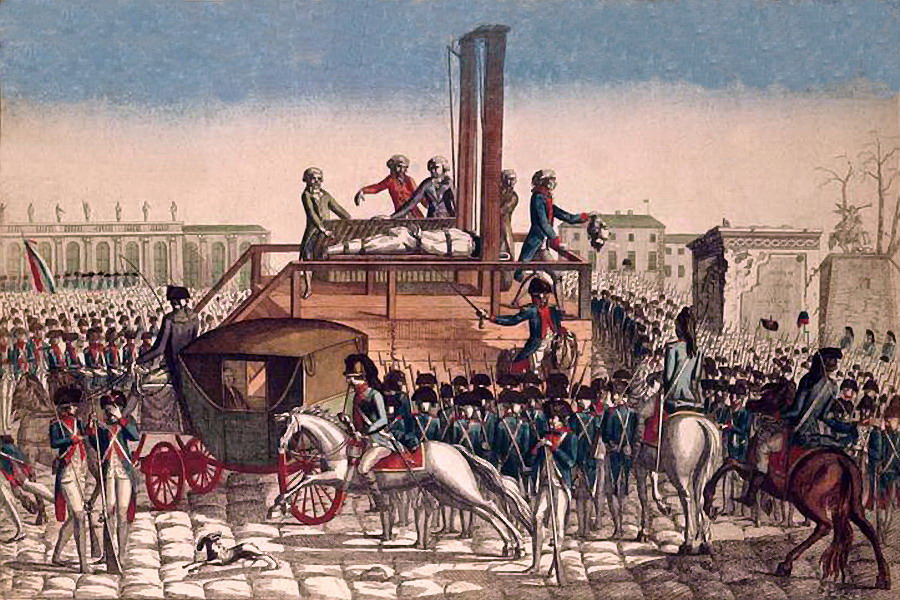
Engraving depicting the beheading of King Louis XVI

In 1793, King Louis XVI of France, cousin of Charles IV of Spain, was beheaded by rebels. This influenced Sánchez Ramírez to join the War of Convention, rising to the rank of Captain. With his own fortunes, he took part in the battles fought by Spain and France, of which allies of the former consisted of Haitian auxiliary troops such as Jean François and Georges Biassou.

Following the capture of Gipuzkoa, the then Spanish Secretary of State, Manuel Godoy, began to raise concern. He felt that this would cause Vascongadas to switch allegiance from Spain and ally with France. Seeking to end the war, the Spanish government began to consider negotiations. France demanded the version of Gipuzkoa, Louisiana, and the eastern colony of Hispaniola, Santo Domingo. Spain, however, sought the preservation of the Catholic faith, (which had been replaced with the Cult of Reason), in addition to the territories where the late king's son, Louis XVII, could loosen its sovereignty, as well as the restriction of the limits to the situation prior to the war. Unfortunately, France rejected Spain's request, referring to their demands as a direct insult to French sovereignty. By May 1795, new negotiations were held in Basel. France once again proposed in securing Gipuzkoa, Santo Domingo, and Louisiana. Domingo d'Yriarte, however, was instructed not to cede any territories, opting to seek the release of Louis XVII. A month later, Godoy agrees to sign a preliminary treaty, recognizing revolutionary France. The treaty's term included limiting Spain's domain, restoring Catholicism in France, freeing the children of Louis XVI and forming an alliance against Great Britain. (This would stipulate in the 1796 Second Treaty of San Ildefonso). On July 22, the definitive treaty was signed, and in return for the occupied Spanish territories, Spain would cede Santo Domingo to France. While commercial relations renewed, Spain also agreed to refrain from any persecutions of the French, as well as the release of María Teresa de Borbón.

=== 1801–1805: Occupation by France and departure to Puerto Rico ===
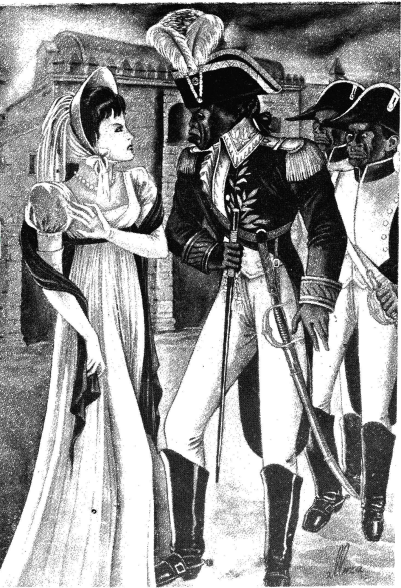
Toussaint Louverture in Santo Domingo, 1801

Although Santo Domingo was now under French administration, the colony was still in Spanish hands. France was still occupied by conflicts with the British as well as the ongoing Haitian Revolution that was still transpring in neighbouring Saint-Domingue (present-day Haiti). Because of this, in 1799, Santo Domingo sent a request to the court, asking King Charles IV to postpone the change in administration until the issues of the first counsel in France were resolved. However, In 1801, the Haitian revolutionary Toussaint Louverture, having just defeated his rival André Riguad in the War of Knives, decided to carry out the occupation, (despite Bonaparte's orders), as agreed in the Treaty of Basel, capturing Santo Domingo from France and freeing the remaining Dominican slaves. By February 1801, the Spanish governor, Joaquín García y Moreno, along with his troops, were off the island. In 1802, a troop of fifty thousand soldiers led by the French Leclerc reached the East of the island. These soldiers defeated Toussaint and reestablished their authority over the territory. Nevertheless, the Haitians and French occupied the lands belonging to Juan Sánchez Ramírez, and to almost all Spaniards living in the colony of Santo Domingo.

Ramírez emigrated to Puerto Rico in December 1803. He landed on the island on January 3, 1804, but with no income or property, he resorted to obtaining compensation that was promised to the new immigrants. In the end, he was forced to use the money of his own assets to provide for himself and of his family. Subsequently, Sánchez Ramírez had left the island just in time to evade the terrifying conflicts of the Siege of Santo Domingo (1805).

=== 1807: Return to Santo Domingo ===
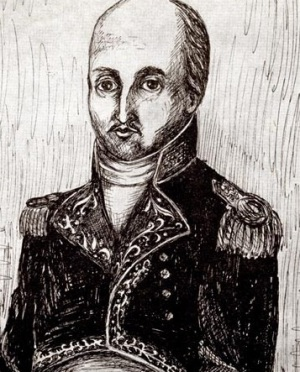
Upon Sánchez Ramírez's return to the island, Santo Domingo was in the hands of General Jean-Louis Ferrand.

In June 1807, he returned to Santo Domingo, arriving though the port of Macao. The French, upon learning of his arrival, tried to offer him the Command of Arms of the town of Cotuy, but he refused to commit to them and instead preferred to leave what remained of his estates in the jurisdiction of said town to people he trusted. He dedicated himself to the exploitation of mahogany in the south of the island and to livestock. His economic interests were affected when governor Jean-Louis Ferrand banned the cattle trade on the border between Northern and Southern Haiti and Santo Domingo.

While Juan Sánchez Ramírez was in his new establishment called El Pulguero, he received an invitation to go to the town of Sabana de la Mar. There, a meeting took place between Sánchez Ramírez and the Commander on May 2, 1808, where they held a conversation about the passage of French troops into peninsular Spain as auxiliaries. During this exchange, the Commander informed Sánchez Ramírez about the news received from a ship that had arrived in the city of Samaná, where it was stated that Emperor Napoleon I "was taking our much loved Fernando VII to France. To educate you; that to Mr. Carlos 4th, he had destined him to live in a convent; and that José Bonaparte was going to govern the Peninsula temporarily, our Fernando learned what was necessary to govern it."

These statements had a profound emotional impact on Sánchez Ramírez, who experienced intense anger and a feeling of betrayal towards Napoleon and the French. Aggrieved by that expression, he could not help but respond to the Commander of Arms: "I assure you that the Spanish nation will never suffer that infamy; and that if that is so, blood is being spilled today in Spain between Spaniards and French. This anger became a turning point in his political thinking and in his commitment to the Fernandina royalist cause in Santo Domingo."

Motivated by this situation, he made the decision to take advantage of the circumstances and lead a conspiracy to start an armed uprising against the French Government in Santo Domingo. Although this uprising legally meant an act of high treason to the French Empire, the landowner assumed the risks and decided to go ahead with the preparations, confident in the traditional loyalty of the Dominicans to the Catholic king:

From that moment I could not shake from my imagination the idea of war, which I already assumed was evident against the latter [the French], and that meeting [with the commander of Sabana de la Mar] produced in my spirit such resentment against them", which, despite the acceptance that I owed them until they called me the friend of the French, I could not see them from then on without becoming extremely irritated.

=== Assistance from Puerto Rico ===
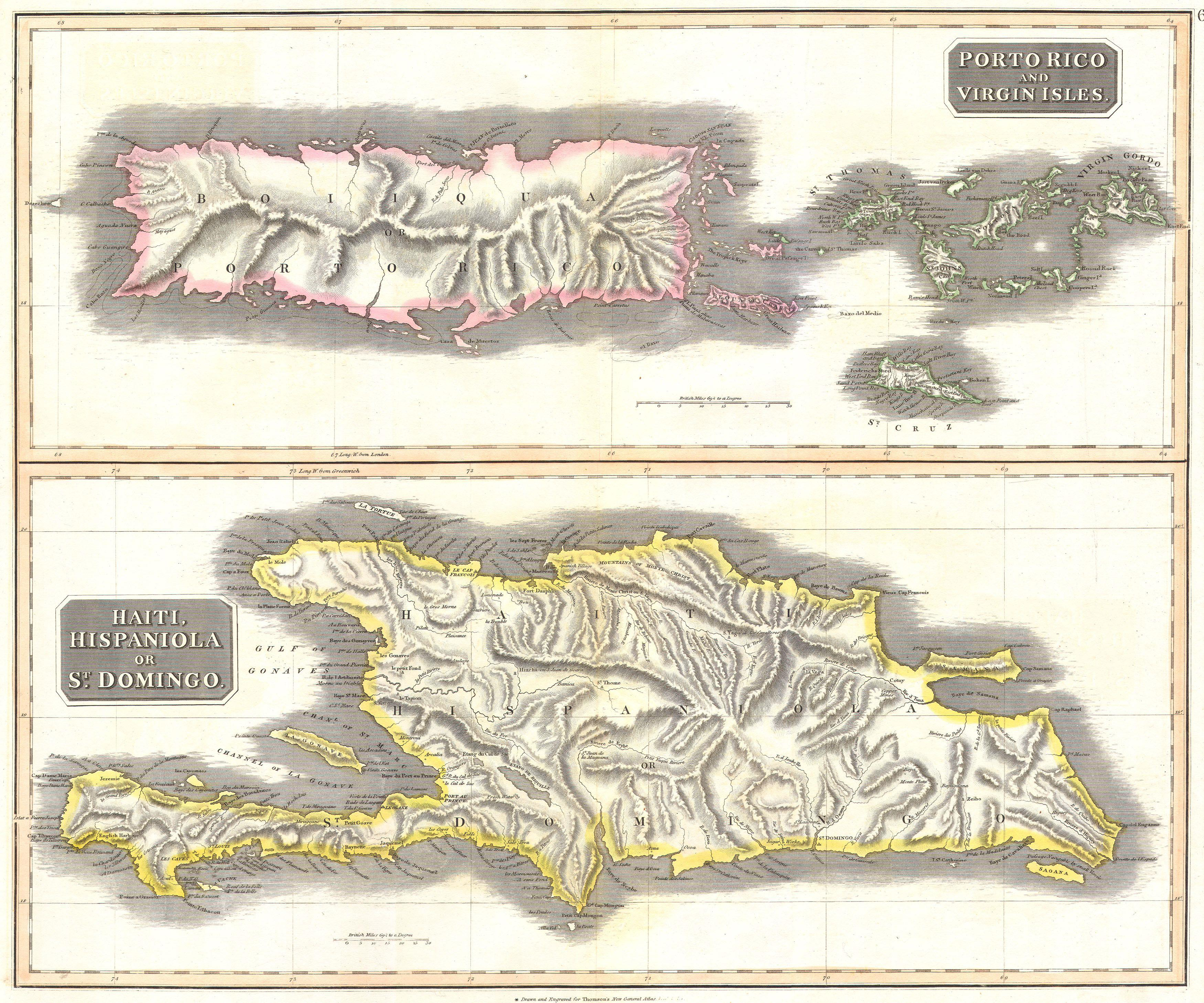
Map of Hispaniola and Puerto Rico

In the following weeks, Sánchez Ramírez had to combine his daily life with secret activities in which he conspired against the French. He firmly believed that it was important to convince the Dominican population to join the fight. Meanwhile, in Spain, the French failed to conquer all the territory and local governments called Juntas were formed. These Juntas recognized Ferdinand VII as king and gave themselves the powers that corresponded to him due to his captivity in Valençay. One of these Juntas, the Junta of Seville, led by Francisco de Saavedra de Sangronis, officially decided to declare war on France. The news of this declaration of war reached the island in July 1808. Sánchez Ramírez found out about this when he was in the town of Higüey and immediately communicated it to his main partner, Manuel Carvajal. They both talked about the news of the war in Spain against the French and that was when they decided to seek help in Puerto Rico to achieve the Spanish restoration of Santo Domingo.

He left Higüey on July 26 and quickly headed to Santo Domingo with the aim of arriving before news of the war spread. To hide his true intentions, he used the pretext of meeting with Louis Ferrand to discuss matters related to his cattle and mahogany lumber business. However, he had to make a stop in the city of El Seibo because he was told that his wife and children were sick. After solving the problem, he continued his journey and used the time to convince more people to join the conspiracy.

On August 7, 1808, he arrived in the capital just as news broke of the declaration of war and some prisoners from a small Spanish ship coming from Puerto Rico. On August 9, he had lunch with General Ferrand, who that same day published a declaration announcing war with Spain, although he referred to it as an uprising of some provinces of Spain. During his stay in Santo Domingo, he intensified his propaganda efforts among the capital residents, knowing that if he managed to take control of that city, he could obtain the support of the entire colony. It was a complicated challenge, since people in the capital had directly suffered the consequences of "Spanish abandonment" after the Basel agreement.and they preferred to preserve the status quo rather than fight for the Spanish monarchy.

On August 13, Sánchez Ramírez paid a visit to Cotui, where people gathered for the publication of a proclamation by Ferrand. At this time, he convinced the people of the betrayal carried out by Napoleon and the need to rise up against France. Surprisingly, the men who were to publish Ferrand's proclamation offered to be ready for any warning from Sánchez Ramírez and destroyed the document. Subsequently, he passed through La Vega, where he met with many inhabitants of the city, including Colonel Agustín Franco, assistant to the general in chief of the Department of Cibao. Then, on the 17th, he arrived in Santiago, where his trip and intentions were already known. With the support of the most important people in the city, with the collaboration of the priest Vicente de Luna, arrangements were made to send a ship from Puerto Plata to Puerto Rico, requesting help to begin "the execution of the plan." However, Franco hindered this attempt at contact. Franco informed Ferrand, but he considered it an exaggeration. Later, on September 1, 1808, he arrived in Bayaguana, where he met with the priest José Moreno, who had great influence in the town, as well as with the Commander of Arms, with the aim of gathering the greatest number of men to favor of reconquest. Finally, on September 4, he arrived in El Seibo, where preparations began to confront Ferrand's troops.

=== Proclamation to the Dominicans ===
In September, Sánchez somehow sent the manifesto to the Dominican emigrants in Puerto Rico, where he indicated his arrival in the City of Santo Domingo on August 7 and commented on the difficulties encountered with some Frenchified Dominicans. The manifesto addressed to the lieutenant fathers of the priest of Mayagüez said:

To the Emigrants of the Island of Puerto Rico:

Beloved compatriots and brothers. The entire circumstances of the island, and finding myself alone in charge of attending to, directing the operations of our defense against the French, our oppressors, do not allow me to give your worships individual news. About the things that have happened and the beginning of fermentation in which we find ourselves: of one, and of the other I will give your graces succinct news, so that as good patriots, and good Spaniards, they can come together so that we can all participate in the glory of freeing us and our country from the yoke of the French, to prove our fidelity to our Spanish government, and to protect our Religion, which the French have tried so hard to destroy. On the seventh of last month I arrived in Santo Domingo, when I found the news of the declaration of war between the Spanish and the French, carried by Captain Braceti.

From this moment I dedicated myself to awakening the spirits of the sleeping and trusting natives. I have not been afraid to speak to some Spaniards, employed and known to be passionate about the French, and all of them very happy with them, trying to electrify some and others, using either pleasantness or severity, as I have considered appropriate. I have not been afraid to compromise my handwriting or signature, even with someone I have considered suspicious, to prove his conduct, and lately I have not been afraid to remain firm in my designs, always persuading my brothers, who are with me, not to let themselves be deceive in the midst of the persecutions that are made against me by this Government, both due to complaints from some Spaniards who have become drunk with the French, and work for the French, as well as due to some interceptions

Do not believe, beloved brothers, that I pay attention to the French, nor will I hide from their persecutions; Do not believe that I will abandon such a Just cause, as the one that calls us today, to shake off the yoke of the French, and that the Island of Santo Domingo returns to its owner, and our Catholic Religion to its ancient Splendor.

Believe that without thinking more than about this important matter, I will not omit a step nor avoid discomfort, nor fear dangers, until I see the Spanish flag raised in Santo Domingo, and that with a voice of joy, we joyfully shout: Long live Ferdinand 7th our Emperor, and King Augustus.

I hope, dear Compatriots, that you will bless me to see such a fast day, that you will anticipate your prayers to our protector, the Governor and Captain General of Puerto Rico, who will seek help for our relief, that on my part, and those who follow me, we will give your graces all the proofs of your recognition, that we will give to your fraternal services, that we will take advantage of in all cases, that we need, and that always is, and will be your graces, With the most sincere affection, your most compatriot lover.

Sánchez continued his itinerant proselytizing work throughout the interior and coast of Santo Domingo. Over time, the French authorities tightened their surveillance around Sánchez and he had to take refuge in the Jayán cove, which was difficult to access for troops with little experience in the field. Only when the governor, mayor and captain general of Puerto Rico, Toribio Montes, informed him that he was willing to provide material support for the campaign, the leader of the reconquest resumed the armed struggle against the French.

=== 1808–1809: War of Reconquista ===
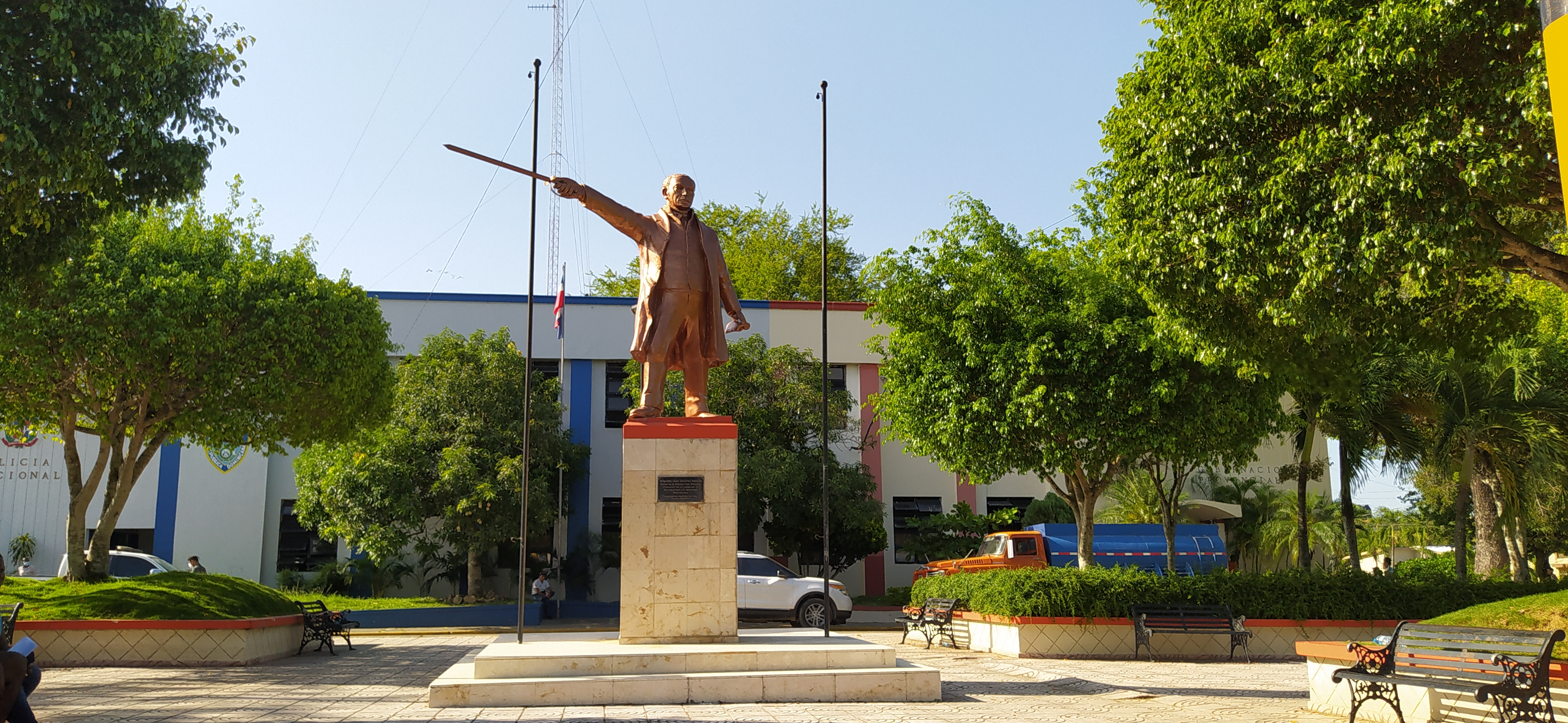
Bust of Juan Sánchez Ramírez in Cotuí, Ramírez Sánchez Province, Dominican Republic.

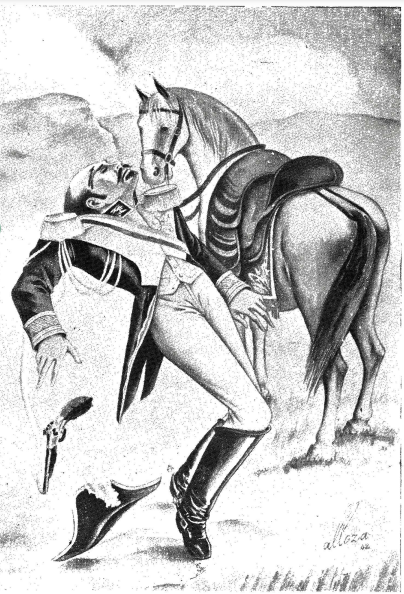
Illustration of Jean Louis Ferrand's suicide, Artwork by José Alloza.

In September 1808, the Spanish insurrection began to spread in Santo Domingo, with numerous towns uniting in favor of the captive Spanish king. Ferrand interpreted these accessions as a declaration of war and responded with violence on the part of his Army. Brigadier Juan Sánchez Ramírez drew up a bold plan to isolate the Dominican capital, advancing rapidly eastward. On September 28, 1808, he managed to interrupt communication between the capital and the bay of Samaná, a crucial strategic enclave. Control of this bay assured the insurgents of food and resource supplies, while depriving France of an important port. At the end of September, the rebels conquered Barahona, considered the first concrete action in the war of reconquest by the French. From there, expeditions were organized to support the Dominican patriots in towns such as Azua, Neiba, Las Matas de Farfán, and many others. In just one month, the insurgents captured the western portion of Santo Domingo.

Between September and October 1808, Sánchez Ramírez sought the support of Toribio Montes, who initially rejected him, but later authorized the shipment of military supplies to the port of Yuma. Meanwhile, Toribio Montes promoted a parallel course of military action and allied himself with the English. The Juntas of Spain had reestablished friendly relations with England, as both countries were opposed to France. Montes negotiated with Captain Charles Dashwood of the British Royal Navy to take and blockade Samaná for the benefit of the Spanish patriots. Dashwood captured two privateer ships and took the city, flying the Spanish flag and enlisting a Spanish officer in command.

As the patriots challenged the French forces, the prisoners and the vanquished faced harsher treatment. Colonel Aussenac, a close collaborator of Ferrand, carried out reprisals against the prisoners, causing destruction and making support for the patriots difficult. However, these intensive measures had the opposite effect, stoking hatred towards the French and strengthening the royalist cause. Ferrand impulsively decided to lead an expedition to confront the patriots, weakening the capital's defenses without his military leadership and accompanying garrison. Before leaving, he issued a proclamation warning the inhabitants of Santo Domingo about the subversion represented by the patriots, without understanding how they had obtained so much support. Furthermore, he threatened harsh repression against those who betrayed France. The repression extended to the entire population of the rebellious enclaves, showing that the guerrilla strategy used by the patriots turned the entire population into belligerents. Ferrand cleared the troops of responsibility for him, arguing that the Dominicans were solely responsible, while he promised rewards for those who remained loyal to France.

In early November 1808, 300 soldiers, sent by Toribio Montes, landed at Boca de Yuma and joined the forces of Sánchez Ramírez. Ramírez left El Seibo (city) in order to march on the city of Santo Domingo. On December 13, 1808, he returned to the city with his troops.

Between then and November 7, 1809, he also was leading the British and Spanish armies against French rule in the Battle of Palo Hincado, defeating Ferrand (who reached him when Ramírez was still in El Seibo) and expelling the French who were hiding in the fences of Santo Domingo.

The survivors fled to the capital of the colony. On day 12, the square was declared under siege by Ferrand's successor, General Joseph-David de Barquier, and 27 men reached Sánchez Ramirez, who established his camp in the Jainamosa section, on the east bank of the Rio Ozama, transferring it, shortly after, to the Gallard, or Galá hacienda.

After the French defeat, Santo Domingo was recovered by Spain, and Ramírez was appointed as Governor of the colony, while the territory was reconstituted as Captaincy General.

=== Government of Santo Domingo ===
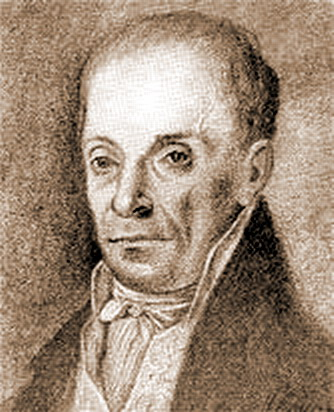
Portrait of Juan Sánchez Ramírez, painted in the early 19th-century

Sanchez convened the board of Bondillo, which established new laws and declared null and void the Treaty of Basel. So the board confirmed the permanence of Santo Domingo in Spanish hands. Santo Domingo was declared Spanish by Ramírez in July 1809.

Under his government, Santo Domingo again traded with the allied countries to Spain, and the Universidad Santo Tomás de Aquino (UASD) was reopened. He suspended the confiscations that the French government had executed against the colony. He also allowed the British to trade in the ports of Santo Domingo. However, Ramirez re-established slavery, which had been abolished by the Haitians, and the number of poor people in Santo Domingo grew. As such, several coup d'états were attempted to expel to Ramírez from Santo Domingo's government. The people who rebelled against their government were executed by the army, which was at the service of Ramirez, or sent to Ceuta.

Ramírez also tried to restore the Dominican economy, but Spain was engaged in the war against the then South American colonies. His mismanagement led to the period known as España Boba (Foolish Spain), in which the Ramirez government punished all those who promoted or fought for the independence of the colony. Once such case included the persecution of Ciriaco Ramírez, who many historians believed to have harboured independence ideas since the War of Reconquista.

Ramírez was ill and died on February 11, 1811, at the age of 49, while still ruling the colony, and was buried in the National Pantheon.

== Personal life ==
Eventually, Ramírez became a landowner. He married Josefa del Monte y Pichardo, with whom he had two children: Juana and José. In Santo Domingo, Ramírez resided on Padre Billini's street. After his death, his supposedly impoverished family moved to San Carlos, Santo Domingo, his widow lamenting 'he had many jobs but never a salary'.

== Legacy ==
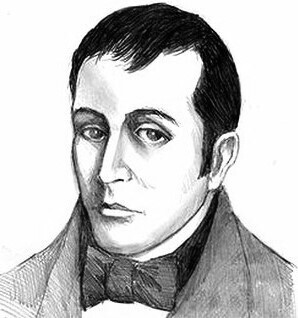
José Núñez de Cáceres

The beginning of the 19th century was the beginning of a stage that marked important pages in Dominican history. Over a period of just over 100 years they were the men under whose leadership the country was formed and established. This entire stage began with a man who, believing in an ideal and knowing how to understand the historical moment in which he lived, knew how to mobilize his men in pursuit of a cause that many considered already lost. He was a man of command, and at the same time, a cultured man. Fair and brave, he was known as a man who loved his country and its culture.

His death was deeply felt throughout the territory of Spanish Santo Domingo, posthumously receiving the title of "Father of the Country." His remains currently rest in the Dominican National Pantheon, in the Main Altar, along with the remains of his right-hand son at the battle of Palo Hincado. However, despite his heroism in defeating the French, his name still carries controversy due to the re-establishment of slavery and his suppression of independence plots. It wasn't years later when his former lieutenant, José Núñez de Cáceres, toppled the Spanish government and declared independence on December 1, 1821.

- A street in Santo Domingo is named after him.
- The province of Sánchez Ramírez is named in his honor.
- A statue of Sánchez Ramírez is placed in Plaza Juan Sánchez Ramírez in the city of Cotuí.

== See also ==
- Era de Francia
- Spanish reconquest of Santo Domingo
- List of colonial governors of Santo Domingo
- España Boba
- Republic of Spanish Haiti
- Haitian occupation of Santo Domingo
- José Núñez de Cáceres
- Juan Pablo Duarte
- Pedro Santana

== Bibliography ==
- Cordero Michel, José. La reconquista de la Parte Española de la isla de Santo Domingo, 1808–1809
- (Mimeografiado). Delafosse, J. B. Lemonier. Segunda campaña de Santo Domingo. Santiago, 1946.
- Del Monte y Tejada, Antonio. Historia de Santo Domingo. 3 vols. Ciudad Trujillo, 1951.
- García, José Gabriel. Compendio de la historia de Santo Domingo. 4 vols. Santo Domingo, 1968.
- García, José Gabriel. Rasgos biográficos de dominicanos célebres. Santo Domingo, 1971.
- Guillermin, Gilbert. Diario histórico. Ciudad Trujillo, 1938.
- Sánchez Ramírez, Juan. Diario de la Reconquista. Ciudad Trujillo, 1955.

Government offices
| Preceded by None | Governor of Santo Domingo; 1809–1811 | Succeeded by Manuel Caballero y Masot |
