= Reales Atarazanas =

Reales Atarazanas (Spanish for Royal Shipyards) may refer to

- Reales Atarazanas (Barcelona), shipyards in Barcelona, Spain
- Reales Atarazanas (Santo Domingo), shipyards in Santo Domingo, Dominican Republic
- Reales Atarazanas (Seville), shipyards in Seville, Spain
