= Joaquín García y Moreno =

Captain general Joaquín García y Moreno

Don Joaquín García y Moreno (1731-?) was a Spanish nobleman and military officer who twice served as governor of the Captaincy General of Santo Domingo from 1785 to 1786 and from 1788 to 1801.

In 1793, a Spanish force under García had marched into the Northern Province of French-ruled Saint-Domingue. In January 1801, Toussaint Louverture and his nephew, General Hyacinthe Moïse, invaded the Spanish territory, taking possession of it from Garcia, with few difficulties. The area had been less developed and populated than the French section. Louverture brought it under French law, abolishing slavery and embarking on a program of modernization. He now controlled the entire island.

He married Eulalia Jacinta Cadrecha y Amat, and his son Joaquín Esteban García y Cadrecha, also served in the Spanish resistance against Toussaint's forces.

== See also ==
- Haitian Revolution
- Devastations of Osorio

== Sources ==
- Perry, James (2005) [1996]. Arrogant Armies: Great Military Disasters and the Generals Behind Them. Edison, New Jersey: Castle Books.
