= Juan Francisco de Montemayor Cordoba and Cuenca =

Juan Francisco de Montemayor Cordoba and Cuenca (1618-1685) was a Spanish lawyer and judge, who served as captain general and governor of Santo Domingo from 1660 to 1662, and as judge of the Real Chancellery of Mexico between 1667 and 1682. He also reconquered Tortuga Island from pirates and wrote various literary works on law, politics, and society.

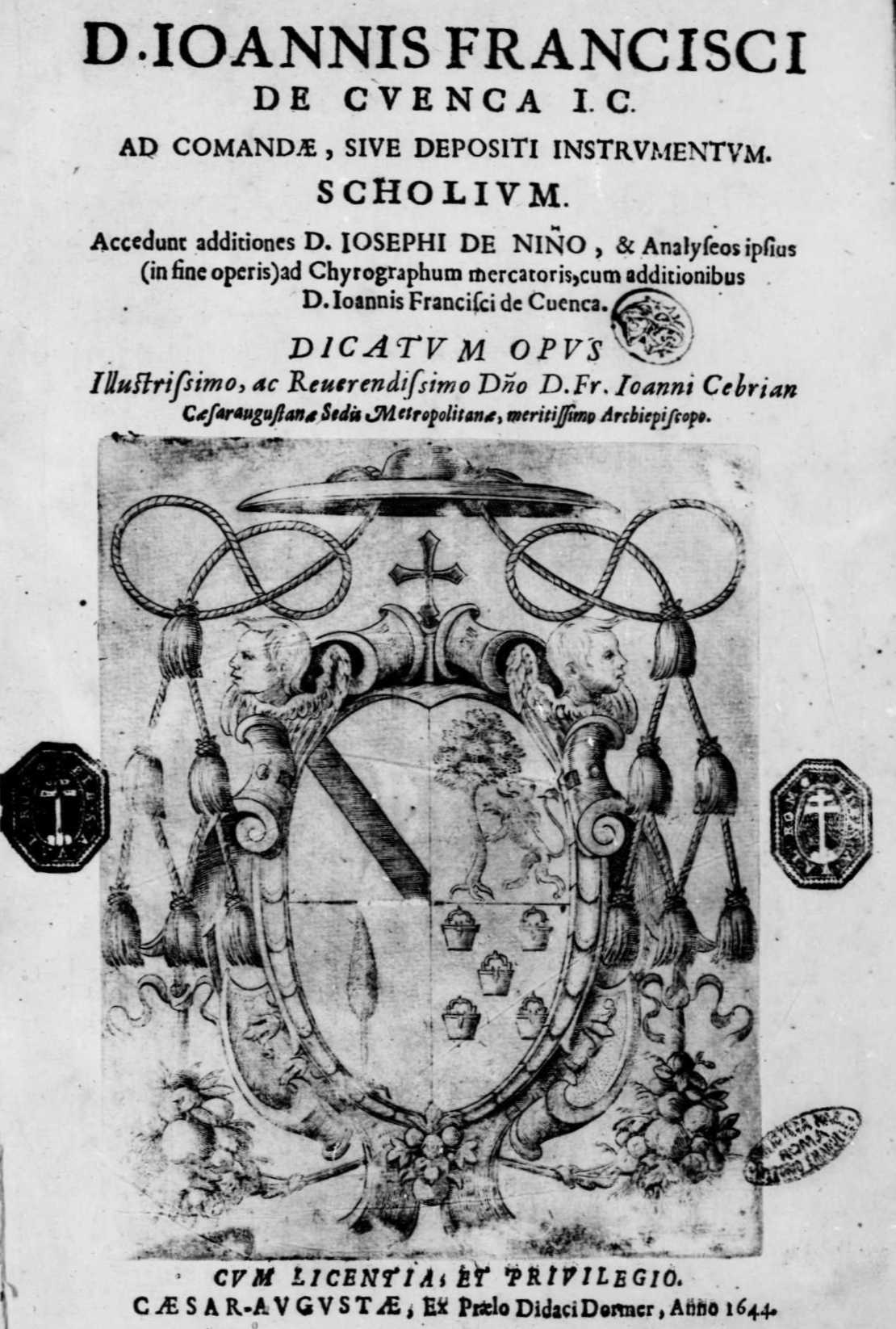
Ad comandae siue depositi instrumentum scholium, 1644

== Biography ==
Juan was born in 1618 in the municipality of Laluenga, in the old diocese of Lérida, in Huesca (Aragón Spain) and was baptized in his parish church on September 7, 1618. His parents were Nadal de Montemayor de Cuenca and María de Lissa, both originating from the bishopric of Barbastro, also in the Kingdom of Aragón. His parents were farmers who owned several houses and land in Laluenga, they also had another son named Ambrosio Montemayor de Cuenca.

Of noble birth, Juan was the lord of the village of Alfocea. He studied at the school of Laluenga, later enrolling in the University of Huesca, where he studied jurisprudence. Around the age of 15 Juan enrolled in the faculty of law, thus beginning his legal career. In 1642, he was appointed judge of surveys of the Crown of Aragon and hearer of Catalonia in February, in 1643 he was appointed General Commissioner and Auditor General of the Army. After this, in 1645, he traveled to Santo Domingo, where he served as judge of the royal audience.

In the Dominican audience he served as dean, president, governor, and finally captain general of Santo Domingo. As captain general, he tried to pacify the island and control the Native Americans who, due to the policy of his successor, thought about raising a rebellion. He also fought against French, English, and Dutch colonists, as well as buccaneers who frequently and increasingly attacked the Spaniards from various places they had occupied on islands near Hispaniola. During this he reconquered the Tortuga Islands, where there was a community of French buccaneers, and then defended it from English attacks. Then he refortified the Island of Santo Domingo and reorganized the militias.

In 1657 the crown rewarded his success by naming him a hearer of the Royal Chancellery of Mexico, where he exercised a policy similar to that of which he practiced in Santo Domingo, in terms of pacifying the natives. In addition, it boosted the economic growth of public finances, which until then had been ruined. Juan was also the police judge of Mexico City between 1669 and 1673.

He retired in 1682 and returned to Huesca, where he was to die on August 21, 1685, however, it is possible that he actually died in Madrid. He was buried in the church of Carmen de la Observancia de Huesca, and was then transferred to the church in the village of Alfocea, as he requested before his death. In this church his portrait, praise, and weapons are preserved, as well as an inscription indicating that the temple was raised at his expense.

== Writings ==
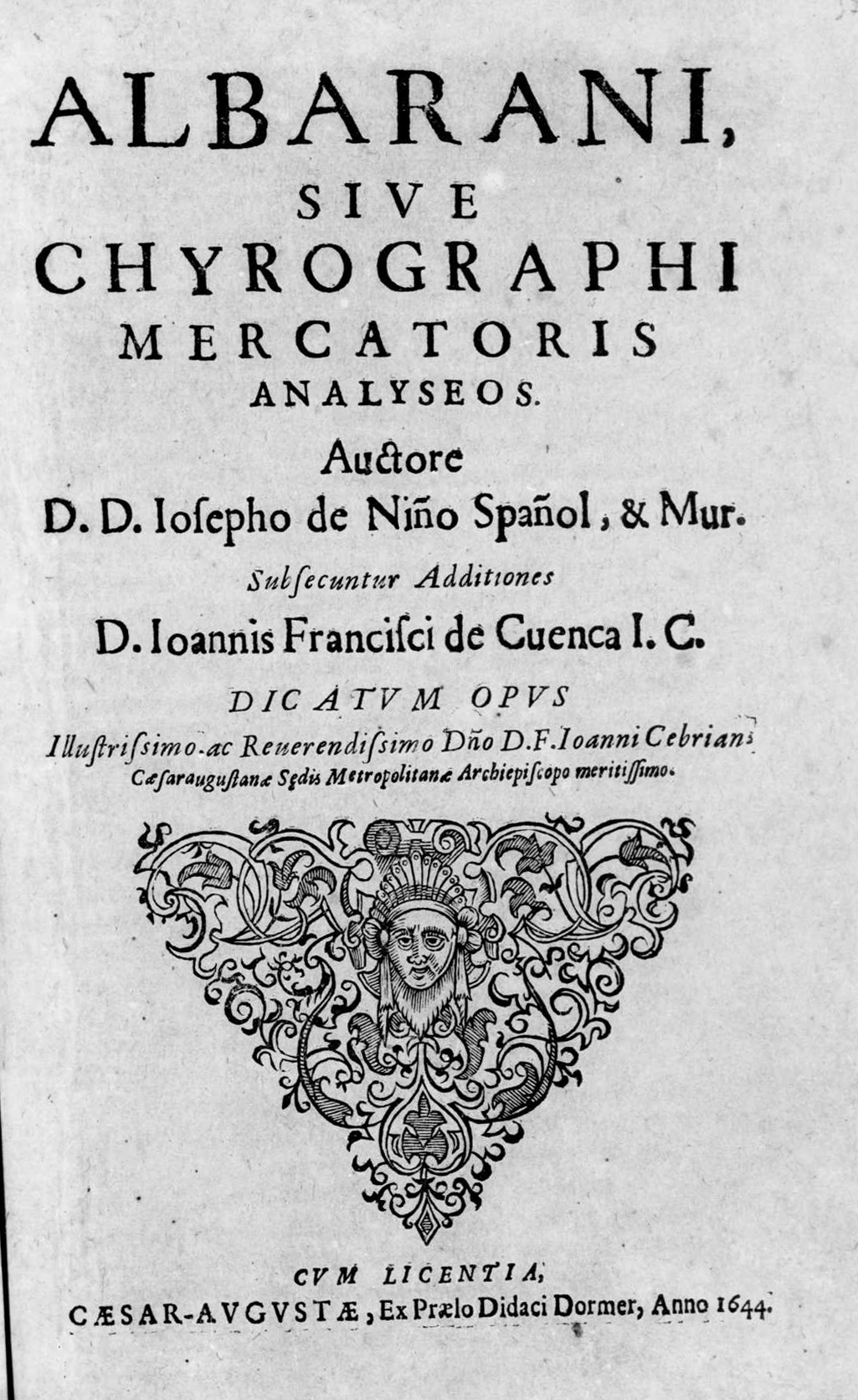
Albarani, sive chyrographi mercatoris analyseos, 1644

As a literary man, Juan wrote many works. His works can be divided into four groups: works of common civil law or Aragonese law, works of Aragon law, works of Indian legal issues, and works of ecclesiastical character. The most notable of his works were:

- Ad comandae siue depositi instrumentum scholium (in Latin). Zaragoza: Diego Dorner. 1644.
- Albarani, sive chyrographi mercatoris analyseos (in Latin). Zaragoza: Diego Dormer. 1644.
- Of sui personalique defensione (1645)
- Historical discourse, legal juridical of the law and repartimiento of prey and despojos apprehended in just war (published in Mexico in 1658, being the first written treaty on the rights of the people published in America)
- Excubationes semicentum ex decisionibus regia chancellariae Sancti Dominici insulae, vulgo dictates Spanish, totius novi orbis primatis compaginatas edit (1667)
- Propugnatio pro regia jurisdictione, et auctoritate (1667)
- Summaria investigation of the origin and privileges of the Rich Men or Nobles, Knights, Infanzones or Sons Dalgo and Lords of Vasallos de Aragón and of the absolute power that they have in them (this was the first heraldic book written in American. 1664)
- Summary compilation of some commandments and ordinances of the government of this New Spain (1677)
- Summary compilation of some agreed cars (1677)

== Family ==
Juan had no children, his only heirs being the children of his brother Ambrosio: Ventura Montemayor Córdoba of Cuenca, Juan Francisco de Montemayor and Ana de montemayor and Córdoba.
