= Atarazanas Reales, Santo Domingo =

Building in Santo Domingo, Dominican Republic

Coordinates: 18.47811°N 69.88308°W

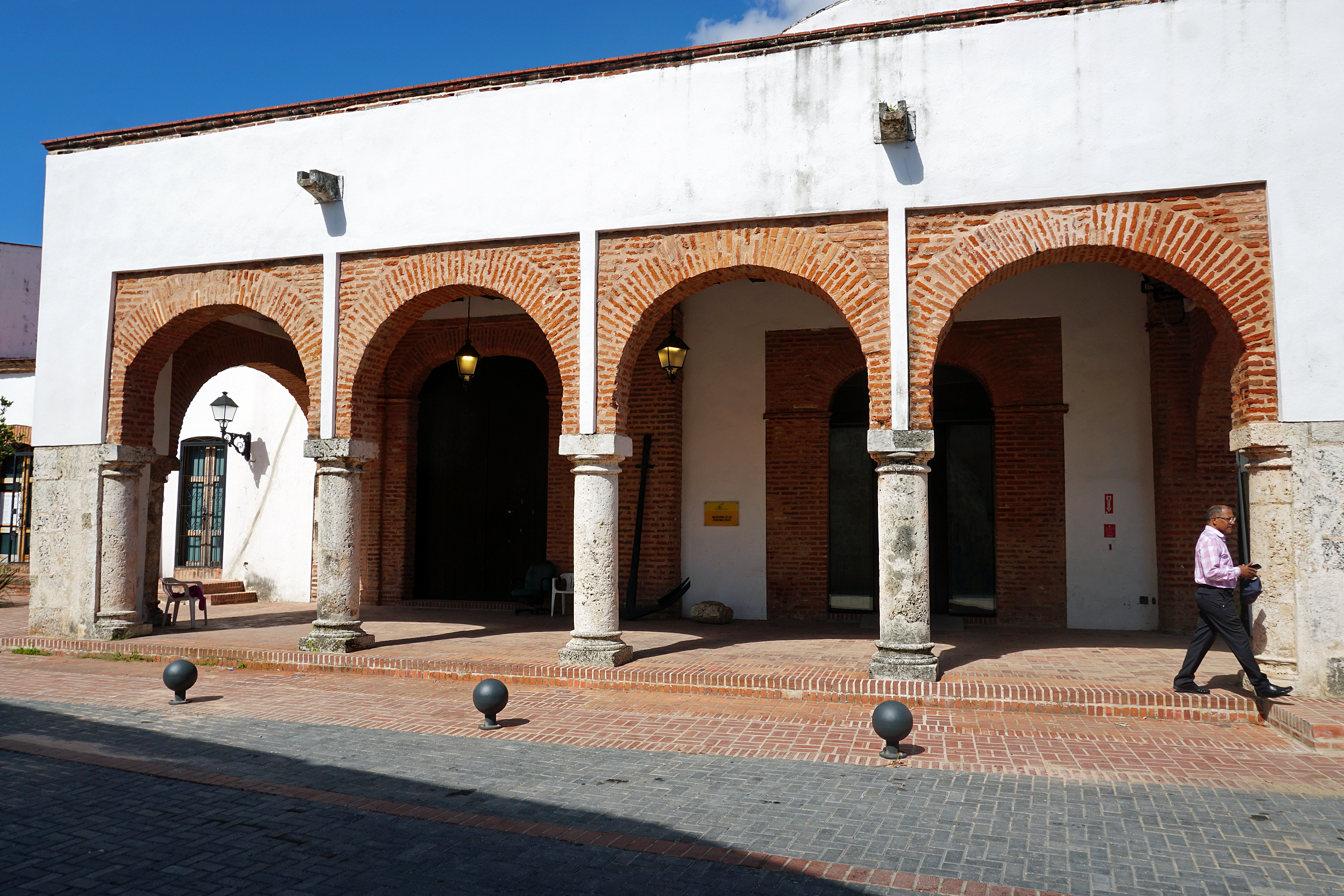
Atarazanas Reales Museum, Colonial City of Santo Domingo

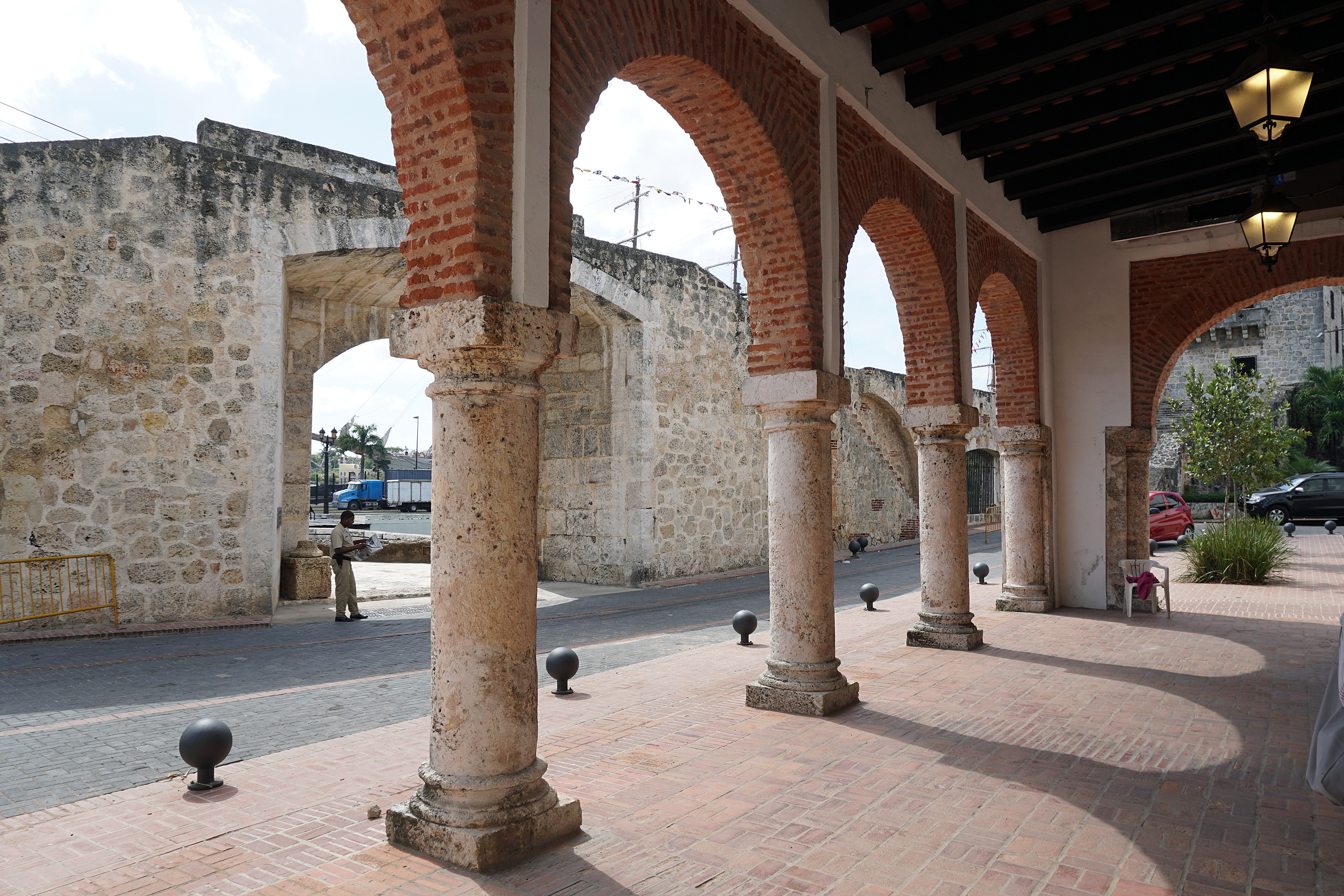
The Atarazans Gate viewed in from of the arcade of the Atarazanas Reales

The Reales Atarazanas (Royal Shipyards) is a waterside building that housed the shipyards, warehouses, customs house and tax offices of the old port of Santo Domingo, Dominican Republic. It was the property of the Spanish Crown. Begun in 1509, the Atarazanas is the oldest building of its type still standing in America, and one of a handful remaining in the Spanish world, amongst which are the Atarazanas Reales de Barcelona, in Barcelona, the Atarazanas Reales de Sevilla, in Seville, the Atarazanas del Grao in Valencia and the Royal Dockyard in Havana.

The Atarazanas building is part of Colonial City of Santo Domingo World Heritage Site, and after restoration in 2018, today houses the Museo de las Atarazanas Reales, which reopened in December 2019 and exhibits artifacts recovered from underwater archaeology and other artifacts from colonial shipwrecks around Hispaniola island and the naval history of the Dominican Republic.

== Purposes ==
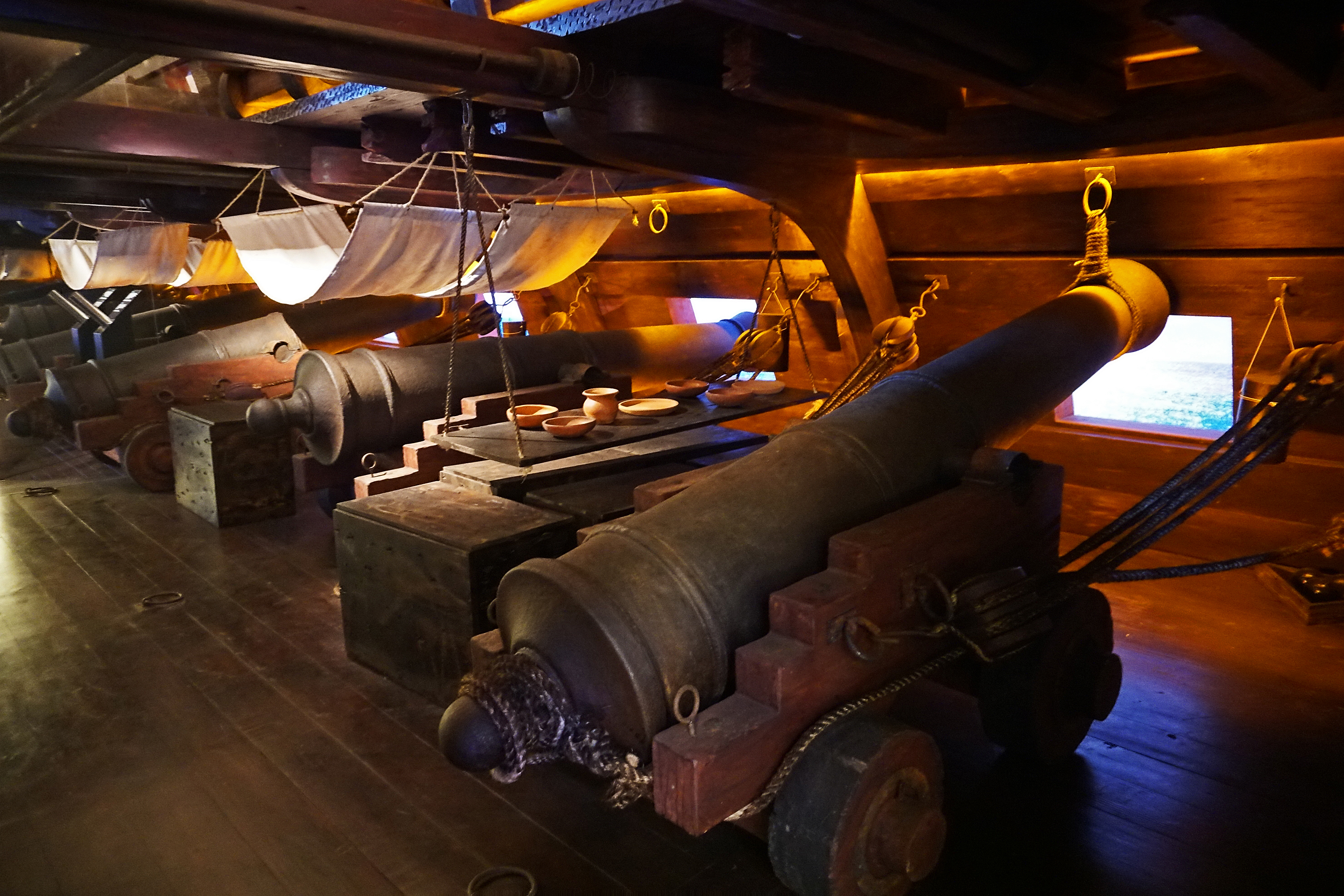
Full size replica of two battery decks of the Spanish galleon Guadalupe at the Atarazanas Reales Museum

In addition to serving as warehouses, the complex also housed the Santo Domingo office of the Casa de la Contratación, headquartered in Seville. Thus, the Atarazanas also served as the first customs and tax house of the New World. Management was contracted by the Crown to the powerful Welser banking family of Augsburg, which made use of the Atarazanas in their failed endeavor to colonize Venezuela.

== Construction ==
Construction began in 1509, and ended in 1541. The brick building contains three parallel, barrel vaulted naves of substantial size, although the north nave (which was temporarily given a flat roof) was finally vaulted as a result of a 1972 restoration. The central nave is slightly wider than the two adjoining ones. In the 18th century, the columned entrance portico, which fronts only the first two naves, was added. Its five stone columns support four brick arches of Moorish influence.

== Location ==
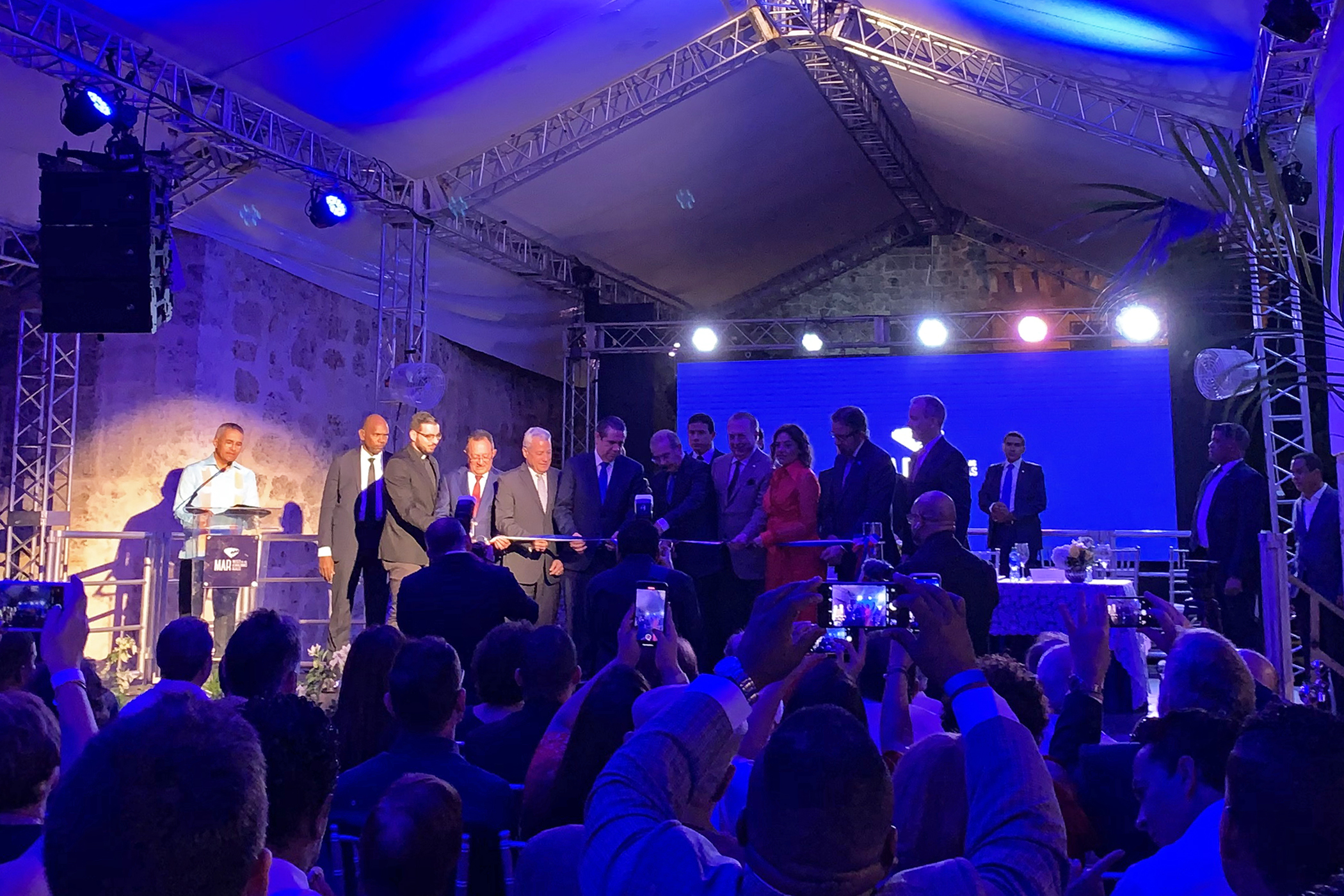
President Danilo Medina cutting the ribbon at the reopening of the Atarazanas Reales Museum, December 12, 2019

The Reales Atarazanas is located north of the Alcázar de Colón in the Colonial City of Santo Domingo. The building in this small neighborhood contained offices and storage spaces where the mercantile activity of the city was carried out, and where the expeditions to the American mainland were stocked with provisions before their departure. The main street is Calle de las Atarazanas (Atarazanas Street) which begins at the riverside Puerta de las Atarazanas (Atarazanas Gate), which is believed to have been used exclusively for the Atarazanas.

It was reconstructed in the 1970s and restored between 2014 and 2018 at a cost of US$2.6 million. Today houses the Museo de las Atarazanas Reales (MAR), which reopened on December 12, 2019 and exhibits artifacts recovered from underwater archaeology and other artifacts from colonial shipwrecks around Hispaniola island and the naval history of the Dominican Republic.
