= Slave rebellion =

Armed uprising by slaves

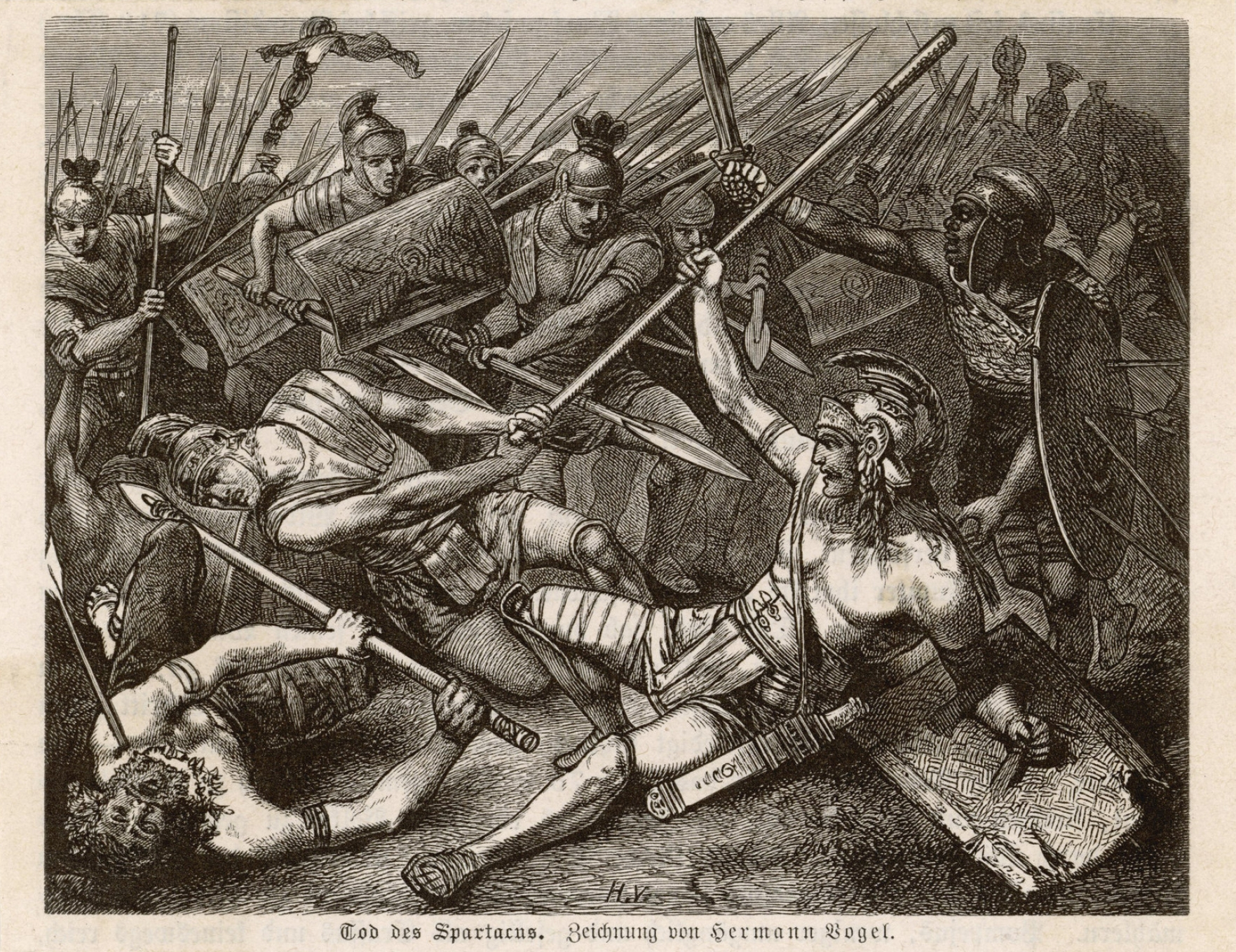
Death of the gladiator Spartacus by Hermann Vogel, 1882

A slave rebellion is an armed uprising by slaves, as a way of fighting for their freedom. Rebellions of slaves have occurred in nearly all societies that practice slavery or have practiced slavery in the past. A desire for freedom and the dream of successful rebellion is often the greatest object of song, art, and culture amongst the enslaved population. These events, however, are often violently opposed and suppressed by slaveholders.

Ancient Sparta had a special type of serf called helots who were often treated harshly, leading them to rebel. According to Herodotus (IX, 28–29), helots were seven times as numerous as Spartans. Every autumn, according to Plutarch (Life of Lycurgus, 28, 3–7), the Spartan ephors would pro forma declare war on the helot population so that any Spartan citizen could kill a helot without fear of blood or guilt in order to keep them in line (crypteia). In the Roman Empire, though the heterogeneous nature of the slave population worked against a strong sense of solidarity, slave revolts did occur and were severely punished. The most famous slave rebellion in Europe was led by Spartacus in Roman Italy, the Third Servile War. This war resulted in the 6,000 surviving rebel slaves being crucified along the main roads leading into Rome. This was the third in a series of unrelated Servile Wars fought by slaves against the Romans.

In Russia, the slaves were usually classified as kholops. A kholop's master had unlimited power over his life. Slavery remained a major institution in Russia until 1723, when Peter the Great converted the household slaves into house serfs. Russian agricultural slaves were formally converted into serfs earlier in 1679. During the 16th and 17th centuries, runaway serfs and kholops known as Cossacks, ("outlaws") formed autonomous communities in the southern steppes. There were numerous rebellions against slavery and serfdom, most often in conjunction with Cossack uprisings, such as the uprisings of Ivan Bolotnikov (1606–1607), Stenka Razin (1667–1671), Kondraty Bulavin (1707–1709), and Yemelyan Pugachev (1773–1775), often involving hundreds of thousands and sometimes millions. Between the end of the Pugachev rebellion and the beginning of the 19th century, there were hundreds of outbreaks across Russia.

One of the most successful slave rebellions in history was the Haitian Revolution, which saw self-emancipated slaves in the French colony of Saint-Domingue overthrow the colonial government and repulse invasion attempts by the French, Spanish and British to establish the independent state of Haiti. In the 9th century, the poet Ali bin Muhammad led imported East African slaves against the Abbasid Caliphate in Iraq during the Zanj Rebellion. Nanny of the Maroons was an 18th-century leader of the Jamaican Maroons who led them to victory in the First Maroon War. The Quilombo dos Palmares of Brazil flourished under Ganga Zumba. In the United States, the 1811 German Coast Uprising in the Territory of Orleans was the largest rebellion in the continental United States; Nat Turner, Denmark Vesey and Madison Washington launched slave rebellions in the U.S. as well.

== Africa ==
In 1808 and 1825, there were slave rebellions in the Cape Colony, newly acquired by the British. Although the slave trade was officially abolished in the British Empire by the Slave Trade Act 1807, and slavery itself a generation later with the Slavery Abolition Act 1833, it took until 1850 to be halted in the territories which were to become South Africa.

=== São Tomé and Príncipe ===
On 9 July 1595, Rei Amador, and his people, the Angolars, allied with other enslaved Africans of its plantations, marched into the interior woods and battled against the Portuguese. It is said that day, Rei Amador and his followers raised a flag in front of the settlers and proclaimed Rei Amador as king of São Tomé and Príncipe, making himself as "Rei Amador, liberator of all the black people".

Between 1595 and 1596, part of the island of São Tomé was ruled by the Angolars, under the command of Rei Amador. On 4 January 1596, he was captured, sent to prison and was later executed by the Portuguese. Still today, they remember him fondly and consider him a national hero of the islands.

In the first decades of the 17th century, there were frequent slave revolts in the Portuguese colony of São Tomé and Príncipe, off the African shore, which damaged the sugar crop cultivation there.

== Asia ==
The Zanj Rebellion against the slavery in the Abbasid Caliphate was the culmination of a series of small revolts. It took place near the city of Basra, in southern Iraq over fifteen years (869−883 AD). It grew to involve over 500,100 slaves, who were imported from across the Muslim empire.

When the Russian general Konstantin Petrovich von Kaufmann and his army approached the city of Khiva during the Khivan campaign of 1873, the Khan Muhammad Rahim Khan II of Khiva fled to hide among the Yomuts, and the slaves in Khiva rebelled, informed about the imminent downfall of the city, resulting in the Khivan slave uprising. When Kaufmann's Russian army entered Khiva on 28 March, he was approached by Khivans who begged him to put down the ongoing slave uprising, during which slaves avenged themselves on their former enslavers. When the Khan returned to his capital after the Russian conquest, the Russian General Kaufmann presented him with a demand to abolish the Khivan slave trade and slavery, which he did.

== Europe ==
In the 3rd century BC, Drimakos (or Drimacus) led a slave revolt on the slave entrepot of Chios, took to the hills and directed a band of runaways in operations against their ex-masters.

The Servile Wars (135 to 71 BC) were a series of slave revolts within the Roman Republic.

- The First and Second Servile War occurred in Sicily.
- The Third Servile War (73 to 71 BC) occurred in mainland Italy. Spartacus, an escaped gladiator supposedly from Thrace, became the most prominent of the rebel leaders; Marcus Licinius Crassus suppressed the insurgents. Many modern rebels (such as the Spartacus League) have since regarded Spartacus as a heroic figure.

According to the Icelandic sagas, Swedish slave revolts occurred at some time between the 5th and 6th centuries, and resulted in the Swedish king Ongentheow being deposed. These large-scale slave revolts were reportedly led by a thrall known as Tunni. Tunni subsequently became king of Svealand after defeating the Swedish king.

A number of slave revolts occurred in the Mediterranean area during the early modern period:

- 1531: 16 slaves who were imprisoned at Fort St. Angelo in Hospitaller Malta revolted and briefly took control of the fort. The revolt was put down and the leaders were killed.
- 1596: a number of slaves in Birgu and Valletta on Malta mutinied, stole the keys to the gates of Valletta and escaped into the Maltese countryside.
- 1748: Hungarian, Georgian and Maltese slaves on board an Ottoman galley named Lupa revolted against Ottoman slavery and sailed the ship to Malta.
- 1749: Muslim slaves in Malta plotted to rebel and take over the island, but plans leaked out beforehand and the would-be rebels were arrested and many were executed.
- 1760: Christian slaves on board the Ottoman ship Corona Ottomana revolted and sailed the ship to Malta.

== North America ==
Numerous slave rebellions and insurrections took place in North America during the 17th, 18th, and 19th centuries. There is documentary evidence of more than 250 uprisings or attempted uprisings involving ten or more slaves. One of the first was at San Miguel de Gualdape, the first European settlement in what would become the United States. Three of the best known in the United States during the 19th century are the revolts by Gabriel Prosser in Virginia in 1800, Denmark Vesey in Charleston, South Carolina in 1822, and Nat Turner's Rebellion in Southampton County, Virginia, in 1831.

Slave resistance in the antebellum South did not gain the attention of academic historians until the 1940s, when historian Herbert Aptheker started publishing the first serious scholarly work on the subject. Aptheker stressed how rebellions were rooted in the exploitative conditions of the Southern slave system. He traversed libraries and archives throughout the South, managing to uncover roughly 250 similar instances.

The 1811 German Coast Uprising, which took place in rural southeast Louisiana, at that time the Territory of Orleans, early in 1811, involved up to 500 insurgent slaves. It was suppressed by local militias and a detachment of the United States Army. In retaliation for the deaths of two white men and the destruction of property, the authorities killed at least 40 black men in a violent confrontation (the numbers cited are inconsistent); at least 29 more were executed (combined figures from two jurisdictions, St. Charles Parish and Orleans Parish). There was a third jurisdiction for a tribunal and what amounted to summary judgments against the accused, St. John the Baptist Parish. Fewer than 20 men are said to have escaped; some of those were later caught and killed, on their way to freedom.

Although only involving about seventy slaves and free blacks, Turner's 1831 rebellion is considered to be a significant event in American history. The rebellion caused the slave-holding South to go into a panic. Fifty-five men, women, and children were killed, and enslaved blacks were freed on multiple plantations in Southampton County, Virginia, as Turner and his fellow rebels attacked the white institution of plantation slavery. Turner and the other rebels were eventually stopped by state militias. Nat Turner was hanged, and the state executed 55 people in all. Nearly 200 other blacks were killed by white mobs during the hysteria that followed, many of them uninvolved in the uprising. White fear led to new legislation passed by Southern states prohibiting the movement, assembly, and education of slaves, and reducing the rights of free people of color. In 1831–32, the Virginia legislature considered a gradual emancipation law to prevent future rebellions. In a close vote, however, the state decided to keep slaves.

The abolitionist John Brown had already fought against pro-slavery forces in Bleeding Kansas for several years when he decided to lead a raid on a Federal arsenal in Harpers Ferry, Virginia. This raid was a joint attack by freed blacks and white men who had corresponded with slaves on plantations in order to create a general uprising among slaves. Brown carried hundreds of copies of the constitution for a new republic of former slaves in the Appalachians. But they were never distributed, and the slave uprisings that were to have helped Brown did not happen. Some believe that he knew the raid was doomed but went ahead anyway, because of the support for abolition it would (and did) generate. The U.S. military, led by Lieutenant Colonel Robert E. Lee, easily overwhelmed Brown's forces. But directly following this, slave disobedience and the number of runaways increased markedly in Virginia.

The historian Steven Hahn proposes that the self-organized involvement of slaves in the Union Army during the American Civil War composed a slave rebellion that dwarfed all others. Similarly, tens of thousands of slaves joined British forces or escaped to British lines during the American Revolution, sometimes using the disruption of war to gain freedom. For instance, when the British evacuated from Charleston and Savannah, they took 10,000 freed slaves with them. They also evacuated slaves from New York, taking more than 3,000 for resettlement to Nova Scotia, where they were recorded as Black Loyalists and given land grants.

=== Timeline of major slave revolts ===
- Santo Domingo Slave Revolt (1521)
- San Miguel de Gualdape Rebellion (1526)
- Bayano Wars (1548)
- Gaspar Yanga's Revolt (c. 1570) near the Mexican city of Veracruz; the group escaped to the highlands and built a free colony
- Gloucester County Conspiracy (1663)
- New York Slave Revolt of 1712
- Samba Rebellion (1731)
- Slave Insurrection on St. John (1733)
- Stono Rebellion (1739)
- New York Conspiracy of 1741 (alleged)
- During the American Revolutionary War, slaves reacted to Dunmore's Proclamation and the Philipsburg Proclamation, fleeing and sometimes taking up arms in the British military against their former masters (for example in the Ethiopian Regiment)
- Pointe Coupée Slave Conspiracy of 1791
- Pointe Coupée Slave Conspiracy of 1795
- Brigand Wars (1790s) — with the St. Lucian battles led by Flore Bois Gaillard
- Gabriel's Rebellion (1800)
- Rebellions in a dozen North Carolina counties (May and June 1802)
- Chatham Manor Rebellion (1805)
- Slaves in three North Carolina counties conspire to poison their owners, in some cases successfully (1805)
- German Coast uprising (1811)
- Aponte Conspiracy (1812)
- George Boxley Rebellion (1815)
- Denmark Vesey's Rebellion (1822)
- Ohio River slave rebellion (1826)
- Nat Turner's Rebellion (1831)
- Baptist War (1831)
- Black Seminole Slave Rebellion (1835–1838)
- Amistad seizure (1839)
- Creole case (1841) — the most successful slave revolt in US history
- 1842 Slave Revolt in the Cherokee Nation
- Charleston Workhouse Slave Rebellion (1849)
- John Brown's raid on Harpers Ferry (1859) — a failed attempt to organize a slave rebellion

== Slave ship revolts ==
There are 485 recorded instances of slaves revolting on board slave ships. A few of these ships endured more than one uprising during their career.

Most accounts of revolts aboard slave ships are given by Europeans. There are few examples of accounts by slaves themselves. William Snelgrave reported that the slaves who revolted on the British ship Henry in 1721 claimed that those who had captured them were "Rogues to buy them" and that they were bent on regaining their liberty. Another example that Richardson gives is that of James Towne who gives the account of slaves stating that Europeans did not have the right to enslave and take them away from their homeland and "wives and children".

Richardson compares several factors that contributed to slave revolts on board ships: conditions on the ships, geographical location, and proximity to the shore. He suggests that revolts were more likely to occur when a ship was still in sight of the shore. The threat of attack from the shore by other Africans was also a concern. If the ship was hit by disease and a large portion of the crew had been killed, the chances of insurrection were higher. Where the slaves were captured also had an effect on the number of insurrections. In many places, such as the Bight of Benin and the Bight of Biafra, the percentage of revolts and the percentage of the slave trade match up. Yet ships taking slaves from Senegambia experienced 22 percent of shipboard revolts while only contributing to four and a half percent of the slave trade. Slaves coming from West Central Africa accounted for 44 percent of the trade while only experiencing 11 percent of total revolts.

Lorenzo J. Greene gives many accounts of slave revolts on ships coming out of New England. These ships belonged to Puritans who controlled much of the slave trade in New England. Most revolts on board ships were unsuccessful. The crews of these ships, while outnumbered, were disciplined, well fed, and armed with muskets, swords, and sometimes cannons, and they were always on guard for resistance. The slaves on the other hand were the opposite, armed only with bits of wood and the chains that bound them.

However, some captives were able to take over the ships that were their prisons and regain their freedom. On October 5, 1764, the New Hampshire ship Adventure captained by John Millar was successfully taken by the enslaved aboard. The slaves on board revolted while the ship was anchored off the coast and all but two of the crew, including Captain Millar, had succumbed to disease. Another successful slave revolt occurred six days after the ship Little George had left the Guinea coast. The ship carried ninety-six slaves, thirty-five of which were male. The slaves attacked in the early hours of the morning, easily overpowering the two men on guard. The slaves were able to load one of the cannons on board and fire it at the crew. After taking control of the ship they sailed it up the Sierra Leone River and escaped. After having defended themselves with muskets for several days below decks the crew lowered a small boat into the river to escape. After nine days of living on raw rice they were rescued.

Mariana P. Candido notes that enslaved Africans worked on the ships that transported other Africans into slavery. These men, 230 in all, were used onboard slave ships for their ability to communicate with the slaves being brought on board and to translate between captain and slaver. Enslaved sailors were able to alleviate some of the fears that newly boarded slaves had, such as fear of being eaten. This was a double-edged sword. The enslaved sailors sometimes joined other slaves in the revolts against the captain they served. In 1812 enslaved sailors joined a revolt on board the Portuguese ship Feliz Eugenia just off the coast of Benguela. The revolt took place below decks. The sailors, along with many of the children who were on board, were able to escape using small boats.

== South America and the Caribbean ==
The Slave Rebellion of December 25, 1521, in Diego Colón's plantation in what is known today as the Dominican Republic is the first known slave rebellion of the region. Despite the suppression of this revolt, many of the slaves successfully escaped, which led to the establishment of the first Maroon communities of the Americas. It would also open the doors for more slave revolts to transpire in the region. In 1532, Sebastián Lemba, of the Lemba tribe, rebelled against the Spanish colonists and for the next 15 years, attacked various other villages on the island liberating other slaves and ransacking from the Spaniards. Other leaders such as Juan Vaquero, Diego del Guzmán, Fernando Montoro, Juan Criollo, and Diego del Ocampo followed in Lemba's footsteps. Dominican slave revolts continued throughout the 18th and 19th century such as the slave insurrections of Hincha and Samaná in the spring of 1795, the Boca de Nigua revolt in 1796, the Gambia revolt of 1802, the black rebellion of 1812, and the 1812 Santiago slave revolt. The 1844 mutiny led by Santiago Basora is considered the final anti-slavery rebellion to occur in the Dominican Republic.

In 1552 Miguel de Buría, a former slave in San Juan, Puerto Rico, reigned as the King of Buría Golden mines in the modern-day state of Lara, Venezuela, after leading the first African rebellion in the country's history. His incumbency began in 1552 and lasted until 1554 after a failed attempt to take Barquisimeto city was killed by Spanish forces.

Between 1538 and 1542, a Guaraní slave from present-day Paraguay named Juliana killed her Spanish master and urged other indigenous women to do the same, ending up executed by order of Álvar Núñez Cabeza de Vaca. Her rebellion is regarded as one of the earliest recorded indigenous uprisings against the Spanish colonization of the Americas.

Quilombo dos Palmares in Brazil, 1605 to 1694, led by Zumbi dos Palmarés.

San Basilio de Palenque in Colombia, 16th century to the present, led by Benkos Biohó.

The St. John's Slave Rebellion of 1733, in St. John, then the Danish West Indies, was one of the earliest and longest lasting slave rebellions in the Americas. It ended with defeat, however, and many rebels, including one of the leaders Breffu, committed suicide rather than being recaptured.

The most successful slave uprising was the Haitian Revolution, which began in 1791 and was eventually led by Toussaint L'Ouverture, culminating in the independent black republic of Haiti.

Panama also has an extensive history of slave rebellions going back to the 16th century. Slaves were brought to the isthmus from many regions in Africa, including the modern day countries of the Congo, Senegal, Guinea, and Mozambique. Immediately before their arrival on shore, or very soon after, many enslaved Africans revolted against their captors or participated in mass maroonage or desertion. The freed Africans founded communities in the forests and mountains, organized guerrilla bands known as Cimarrones. They began a long guerrilla war against the Spanish Conquistadores, sometimes in conjunction with nearby indigenous communities like the Guna and the Guaymí. Despite massacres by the Spanish, the rebels fought until the Spanish crown was forced to concede to treaties that granted the Africans a life without Spanish violence and incursions. The leaders of the guerrilla revolts included Felipillo, Bayano, Juan de Dioso, Domingo Congo, Antón Mandinga, and Luis de Mozambique.

The Suriname slave rebellion was marked by constant guerrilla warfare by Maroons and in 1765–1793 by the Aluku. This rebellion was led by Boni.

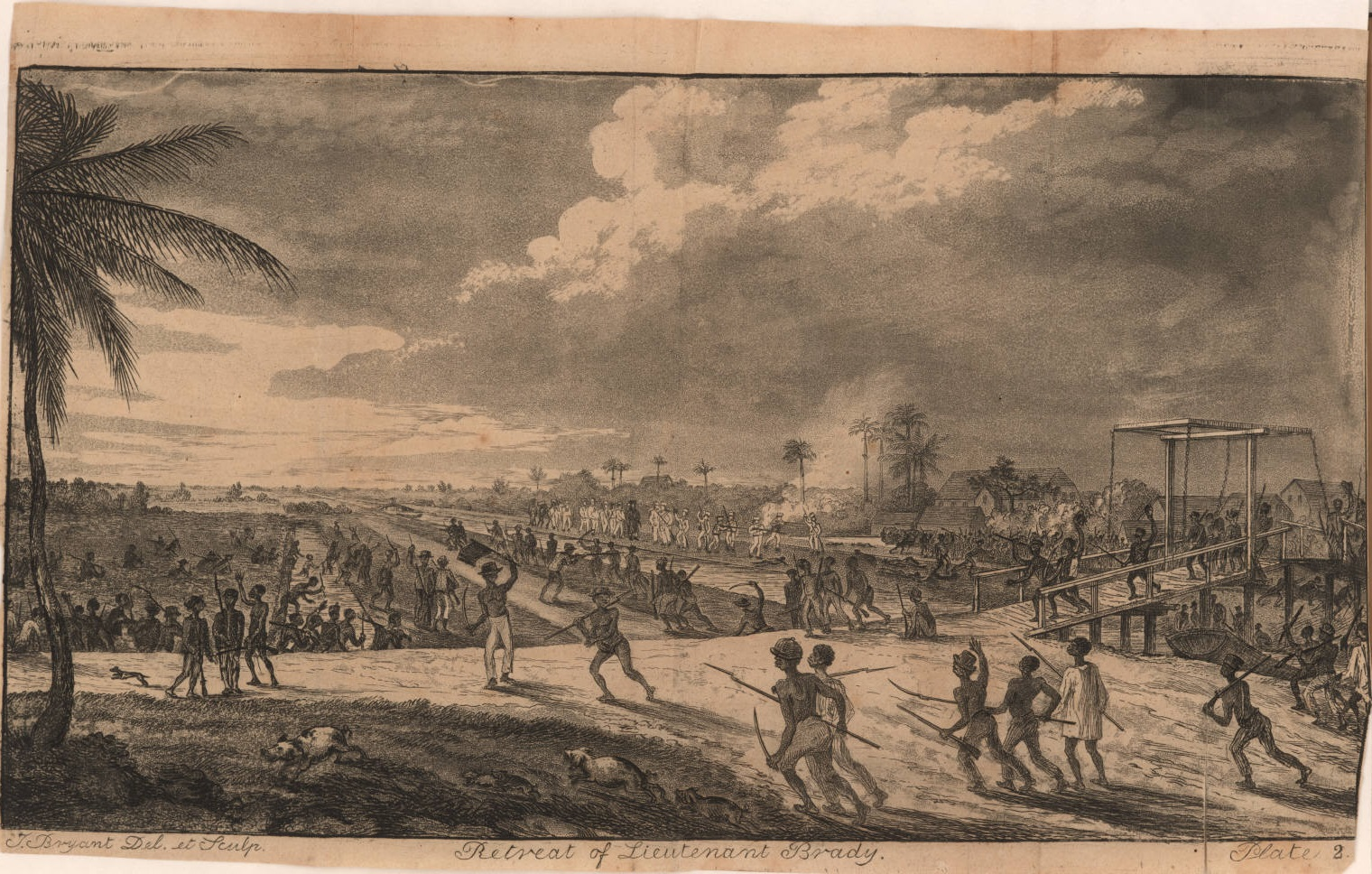
Slaves force the retreat of European soldiers led by Lt Brady during Demerara rebellion of 1823

The Berbice Slave Rebellion in Guyana in 1763 was led by Cuffy.

=== Revolts on the Caribbean Islands ===
In the 1730s, the militias of the Colony of Jamaica fought the Jamaican Maroons for a decade, before agreeing to sign peace treaties in 1739 and 1740, which recognised their freedom in five separate Maroon Towns.

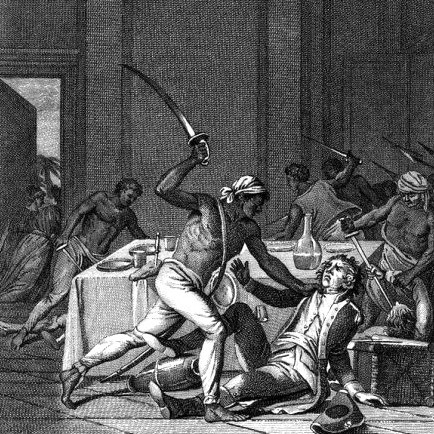
Tacky's War in Jamaica (1760)

Tacky's War (1760) was a slave uprising in Jamaica, which ran from May to July before it was put down by the British colonial government.

Vincent Brown, a professor of History and of African and African-American Studies at Harvard, has made a study of the transatlantic slave trade. In 2013, Brown teamed up with Axis Maps to create an interactive map of Jamaican slave uprisings in the 18th century called "Slave Revolt in Jamaica, 1760–1761, A Cartographic Narrative". Brown's efforts have shown that the slave insurrection in Jamaica in 1760–61 was a carefully planned affair and not a spontaneous, chaotic eruption, as was often argued (due in large part to the lack of written records produced by the insurgents).

Later, in 1795, several slave rebellions broke out across the Caribbean, some of which may have been influenced by the Haitian Revolution:

- In Martinique the slave rebellion broke out during the French Revolution which compared to the Haitian Revolution led by Toussaint L'Ouverture.
- In Jamaica, the descendants of Africans who fought and escaped from slavery and established free communities in the mountainous interior of Jamaica (Maroons), fought to preserve their freedom from British colonialists, in what came to be known as the Second Maroon War. However, this featured just one of the five Maroon towns in Jamaica.
- In Dominica there was the Colihault Uprising.
- In Saint Lucia there was the Bush War in 1795.
- In the Saint Vincent islands the Second Carib War broke out.
- In Grenada there was the Fedon Rebellion.
- Curaçao had a slave revolt in 1795, led by Tula.
- In Venezuela, the insurrection led by José Leonardo Chirino occurred in 1795.
- In Barbados, a slave revolt occurred in 1816, led by Bussa.
- In Guyana there was the Demerara Rebellion of 1795.
- In the British Virgin Islands, minor slave revolts occurred in 1790, 1823 and 1830.
- In Cuba, there were several revolts starting in 1825 with an uprising in Guamacaro and ending with the revolts of 1843 in Matanzas. These revolts have been widely studied by scholars such as Robert L. Paquette, Gloria García, Manuel Barcia, Aisha K. Finch and Michele Reid-Vazquez.
- In the Danish West Indies an 1848 slave revolt led to emancipation of all slaves in the Danish West Indies.
- In Puerto Rico in 1821, Marcos Xiorro planned and conspired to lead a slave revolt against the sugar plantation owners and the Spanish Colonial government. Even though the conspiracy was unsuccessful, Xiorro achieved legendary status among the slaves and is part of Puerto Rico's folklore.
- The St. Joseph Mutiny of 1837 in Trinidad, which was led by mutineers from the British Army's 1st West India Regiment (many of whom had been liberated from illegal slave ships by the Royal Navy).

Cuba had slave revolts in 1795, 1798, 1802, 1805, 1812 (the Aponte revolt), 1825, 1827, 1829, 1833, 1834, 1835, 1838, 1839–43 and 1844 (the La Escalera conspiracy and revolt).

=== Brazil ===
Many slave rebellions occurred in Brazil, most famously the Malê Revolt of 1835 by the predominantly Muslim West African slaves at the time. The term malê was commonly used to refer to Muslims at the time from the Yoruba word imale.

== See also ==
- History of slavery
- Labour revolt
- List of revolutions and rebellions
- Slave ship

== Bibliography ==
- Herbert Aptheker, American Negro Slave Revolts, 6. ed., New York: International Publ., 1993 – classic
- Candido, Mariana P. (September 2010). "Different Slave Journeys: Enslaved African Seamen on Board of Portuguese Ships, c. 1760–1820s". Slavery & Abolition. 31 (3): 395–409. doi:10.1080/0144039X.2010.504530.
- Matt D. Childs, The 1812 Aponte Rebellion in Cuba and the Struggle Against African Slavery, Chapel Hill: University of North Carolina Press, 2006
- Duque, Elvia (2013). Aportes Del Pueblo Afrodescendiente: La Historia Oculta De América Latina. iUniverse. ISBN 978-1475965834.
- David P. Geggus, ed., The Impact of the Haitian Revolution in the Atlantic World, Columbia: University of South Carolina Press, 2001
- Eugene D. Genovese, From Rebellion to Revolution: Afro-American Slave Revolts in the Making of the Modern World, Louisiana State University Press 1980
- Joao Jose Reis, Slave Rebellion in Brazil: The Muslim Uprising of 1835 in Bahia (Johns Hopkins Studies in Atlantic History and Culture), Johns Hopkins Univ Press 1993
- Rodríguez, Junius P. (2006). Encyclopedia of Slave Resistance and Rebellion, Vol. 1. Greenwood Publishing Group. ISBN 0313332711.
- Rodriguez, Junius P., ed. Slavery in the United States: A Social, Political, and Historical Encyclopedia. Santa Barbara, CA: ABC-CLIO, 2007.
- Simón, Pedro (1992). Noticias historiales de Venezuela. Fundación Biblioteca Ayachucho. ISBN 9802762105.
- Urbainczyk, Theresa Slave Revolts in Antiquity (University of California Press, Berkley), 2008
