= 1796 Boca de Nigua slave revolt =

1796 slave insurrection in the Dominican Republic

1796 Boca de Nigua Rebellion
- Part of The Slave Revolts in North America and Age of Revolution
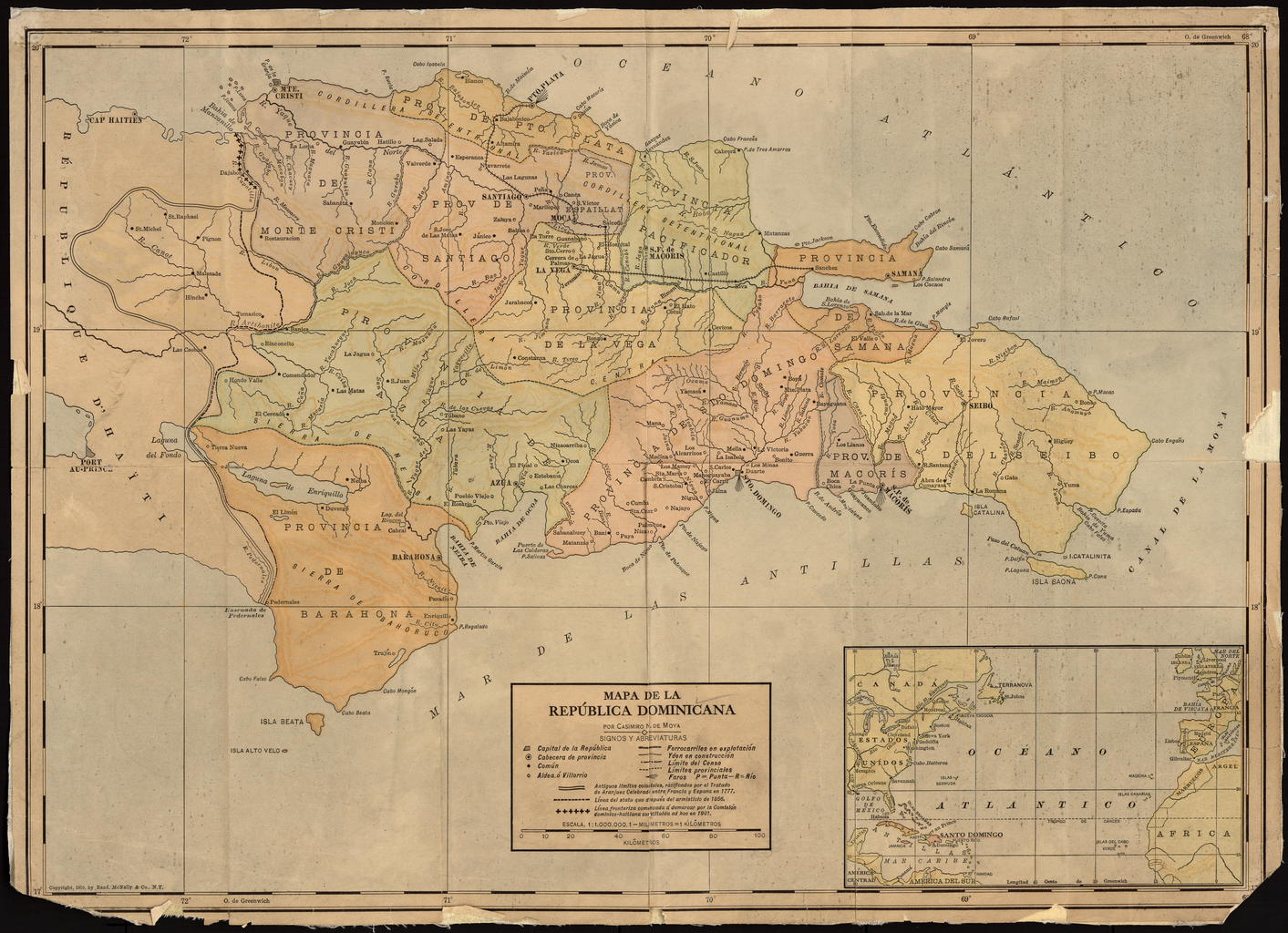
- Map of eastern Hispaniola, (present-day Dominican Republic), by Casimiro Nemesio de Moya.
- Date: October 26, 1796; 228 years ago
- Location: Nigua Sugar Mill, Colony of Santo Domingo
- Goals: Independence of Santo Domingo; Liberation of slaves
- Result: Suppression of the revolt

Parties
Enslaved Africans	Slaveowners, Spanish colonial government

Lead figures
Francisco Sopo; Pedro Viego; Tomás Aguirre; Antonio Carretero; Ana María	Juan Bautista Oyazábal

The 1796 Boca de Nigua Rebellion was a slave rebellion that occurred in what became the Dominican Republic. It was the largest slave revolt in Dominican history. The revolt was brutally suppressed. However, it laid the foundations for the defense of black human rights in Santo Domingo, which remained a social issue well into the mid-19th century.

== History ==
Following previous slave leaders, such as Diego del Ocampo, Sebastián Lemba, and Diego Vaquero, the fight against slavery had been planted in the minds of Santo Domingo's slaves. Motivated by the Haitian Revolution, which took place in neighboring Saint-Domingue, the blacks of Boca de Nigua took the slave owners by storm and started a liberation movement in eastern Hispaniola, which became the Dominican Republic.

Amid fire and drums, the slave revolt broke out on October 30, 1796, at Boca de Nigua Sugar Mill. Managed by Spanish nobleman Juan Bautista de Oyazabal and owned by the Duke of Aranda, the crew of 200 slaves set out to carry out a full-scale rebellion. They proceeded to destroy and burn agricultural plantations and symbols that chained them to the regime: sugarcane fields, houses, and all the master's property.

Oyazabal unsuccessfully tried to repel the rebellion with the help of some whites. Oyazabal was forced to go to the city and appeal to the governor of the island, Joaquín García y Moreno, in order to obtain military aid. With a military force equipped with sophisticated weapons, cannons, shrapnel, and specialized men, they set out against the rebels.

After large battles, the slave owners dispersed the rebels towards the forest and other areas surrounding the sugar mill. Later, with the payment of rewards, an operation was carried out to arrest them. The goal was to capture the entire rebel crew. They executed the two foremen who were in the sugar mill, one drowned inside a liquor pipe and the other with whippings in return for the daily whipping he brandished on the backs of the black workers.

Casualties afflicted both sides. Seven rebels were killed and 69 taken prisoner, which paralyzed the triumph of the emancipation of the blacks. A number of whites were killed and wounded. The rebels were sentenced a month later. Some were beheaded, others received one hundred lashes in the public pillory, and others were sentenced to exile in prisons in Panama, Cuba, Colombia, and Mexico.

== See also ==
- History of the Dominican Republic
- Treaty of Basel
- Era de Francia
- Afro-Dominicans
- Slave rebellion
