= Édouard Glissant =

French writer, poet, philosopher and literary critic

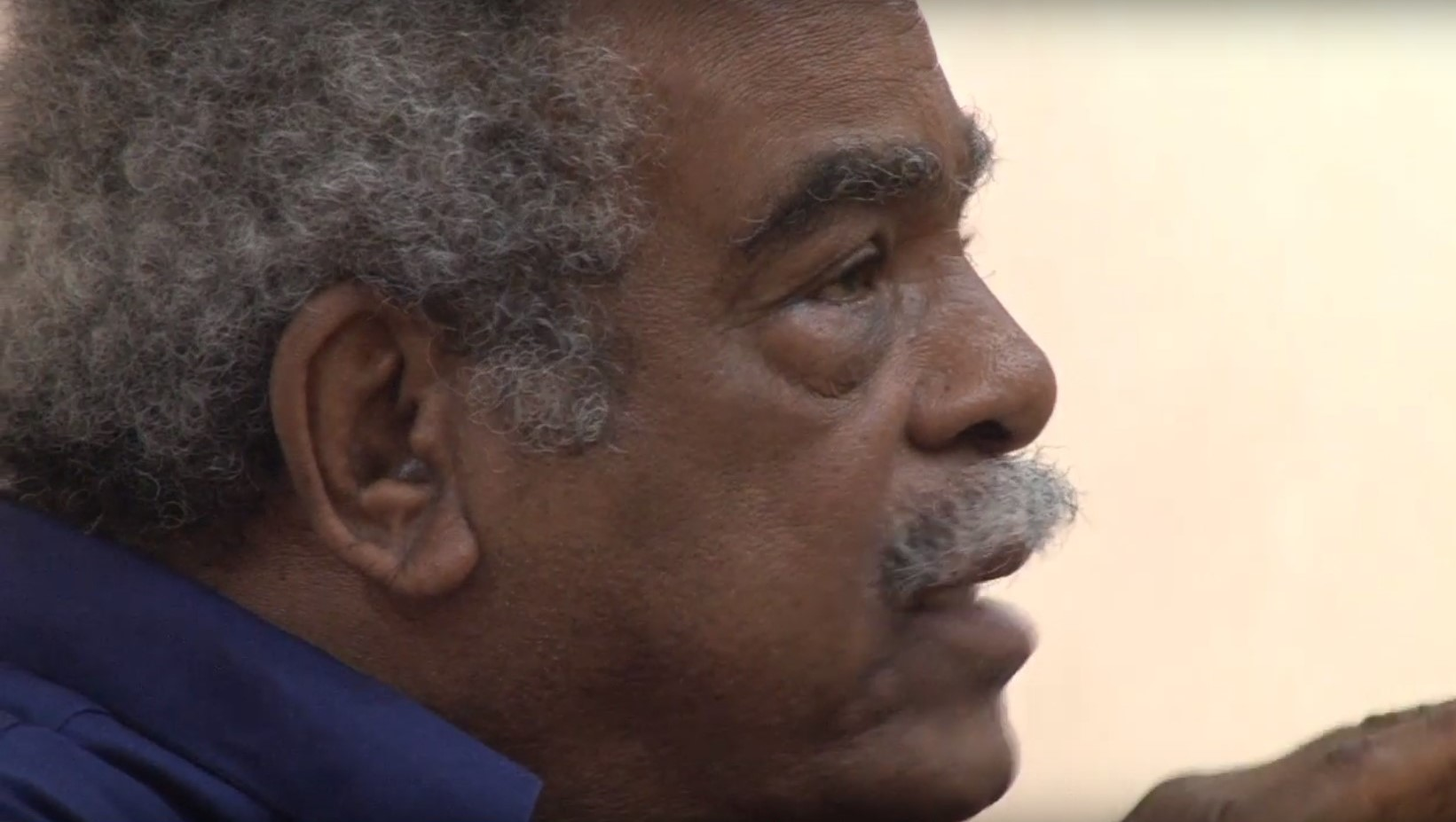
- Born: 21 September 1928; Sainte-Marie, Martinique, France
- Died: 3 February 2011 (aged 82); Paris, France
- Spouses: Yvonne Suvélor; Maryse Hospice; Sylvie Sémavoine
- Children: 5

Education
- Education: Musée de l'Homme; University of Paris (PhD)
- Doctoral advisor: Bernard Teyssèdre
- Other advisor: Jean Wahl

Philosophical work
- Era: Contemporary philosophy
- Region: Africana philosophy
- School: Postcolonialism
- Institutions: Louisiana State University; CUNY
- Notable ideas: Poetics of relation; Theory of the rhizome; The right to opacity

Édouard Glissant (French: [ɡlisɑ̃]; 21 September 1928 – 3 February 2011) was a French writer, poet, philosopher, and literary critic from Martinique. He remains an influential and celebrated figure in Caribbean thought and cultural commentary as well as within multiple Francophone literary canons. His Poetics of Relation has been used by scholars to understand the rapid transformation of a multicultural world.

== Early life and education ==
Édouard Glissant was born in Sainte-Marie, Martinique, and moved to Lamentin, Martinique, for primary school. He and other students were forbidden from speaking Creole.

Glissant's father worked as an agricultural manager as a Géreur d’Habitation, a former slavery plantation converted into a colonial habitation. He learned traditional stories from sugar cane laborers when he accompanied his father during summer breaks from school.

Glissant studied at the Lycée Schœlcher, named after the abolitionist Victor Schœlcher, after being awarded a scholarship in 1938. The poet and politician Aimé Césaire was a teacher at Lycée Schœlcher. There, Césaire met Léon Damas, and they would later join with Léopold Senghor to formulate and promote the concept of negritude.

Glissant left Martinique in 1946 for Paris, where he received his PhD, having studied ethnography at the Musée de l'Homme and history and philosophy at the Sorbonne.

== Writing career ==
In 1958, Glissant published his debut novel La Lézarde. This novel won the Prix Renaudot.

In 1959, Glissant established, with Paul Niger, the separatist Front Antillo-Guyanais pour l'Autonomie party. Charles de Gaulle barred Glissant from leaving France between 1961 and 1965. In 1965, Glissant returned to Martinique. Two years later, he founded the Institut Martiniquais D'études in 1967. Glissant also founded Acoma, a social sciences publication.

In 1981, Glissant wrote "Caribbean Discourse". Glissant was appointed Director and Editor-in-Chief of the UNESCO Courier.

From 1988 to 1993, Glissant was a professor at Louisiana State University in the Department of French and Francophone Studies. From 1995, Glissant was Distinguished Professor of French at the CUNY Graduate Center.

Glissant's 2003 novel Ormerod is a fictional retelling of the life of Flore Bois Gaillard, an 18th-century enslaved St. Lucian woman who joined revel slaves and fought agains the British. In his novel, Glissant imagines that Gaillard was motivated by her sexual assault from her slaveowner, Master Bellec, and that she was publicly executed at the end of the St. Lucian Brigand Wars. In reality, it is unknown what happened to Gaillard after the wars ended.

In January 2006 Glissant was asked by Jacques Chirac to take on the presidency of a new cultural centre devoted to the history of the slave trade. This followed the publication of a letter written to the French Minister of the Interior following riots in Paris. In the letter Glissant and Patrick Chamoiseau criticized a law passed in February 2005 requiring schools to teach the "positive role of the French presence overseas".

=== Writing style ===
Glissant as a writer employs a hybrid literary style.

Glissant's development of the notion of Antillanité seeks to root Caribbean identity firmly within "the Other America" and springs from a critique of identity in previous schools of writing, specifically the work of Aimé Césaire, which looked to Africa for its principal source of identification.

Glissant traced parallels between the history and culture of the Creole Caribbean and those of Latin America and the plantation culture of the American South, most obviously in his study of William Faulkner.

Glissant was the pre-eminent critic of the Négritude school of Caribbean writing, composed of the generation of literary contributors prior to him. He is regarded as a father-figure for the subsequent Créolité group of writers that includes Patrick Chamoiseau and Raphaël Confiant.

=== Theories ===
Glissant was close with Félix Guattari and Gilles Deleuze and was influenced by their theory of the rhizome and Poetics of Relation expands upon the theory of the rhizome.

==== The right to opacity ====
In Poetics of Relation, Glissant explores opacity. This refers to something not being able to be translated or known. Glissant argues that the oppressed should be allowed to be opaque, to not be completely understood, and to simply exist as different.

Glissant calls for understanding and accepting difference without measuring that difference to an "ideal scale" and comparing and making judgements. The Right to Opacity has been applied by scholars in Early Childhood Education and towards the development of Decolonial Ethics.

==== "The Open Boat" ====
In Poetics of Relation, "The Open Boat" introduces Glissant's major theory. The Open Boat is a poem reflecting the slave ship experience.

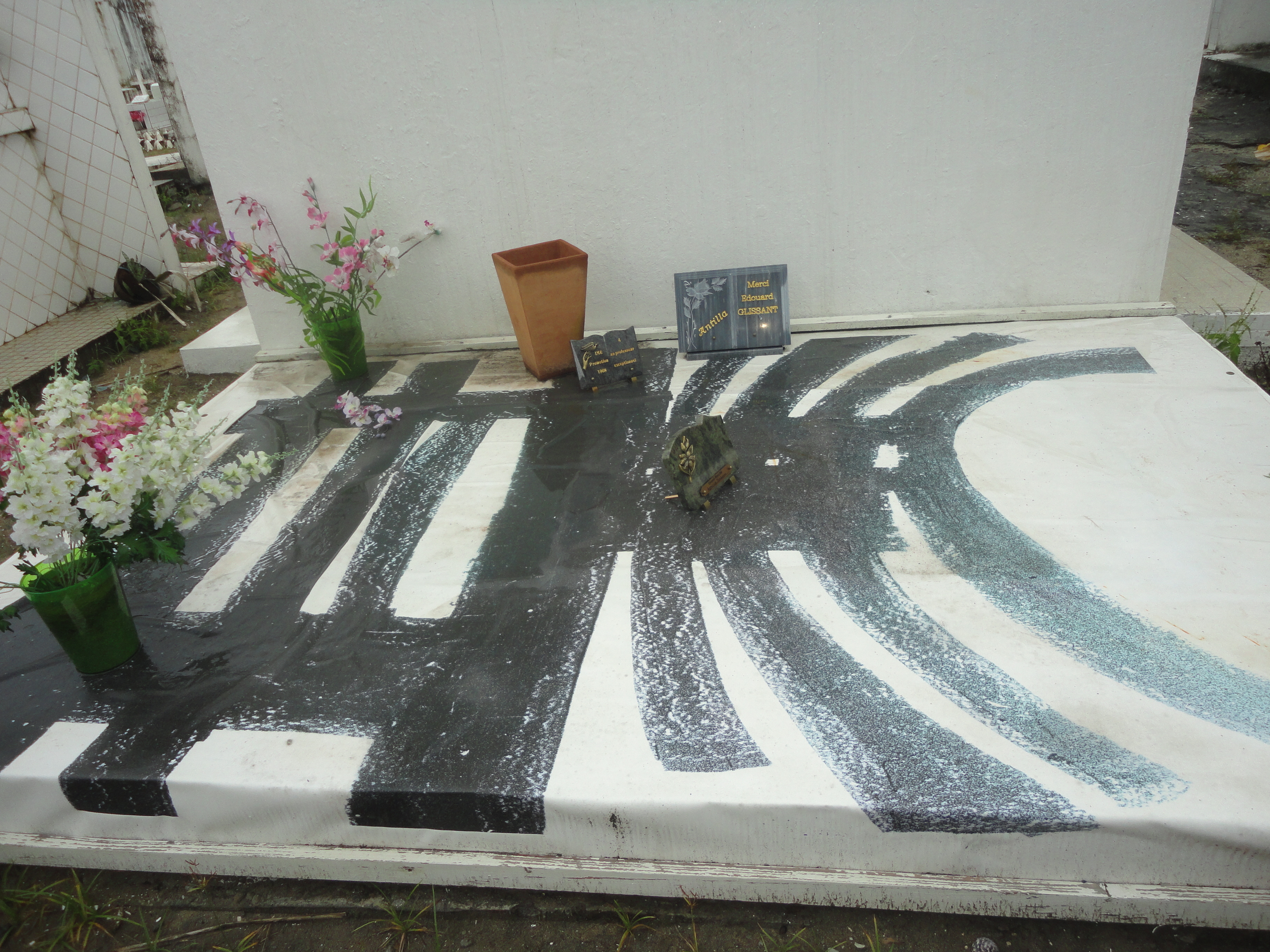
Grave of Édouard Glissant in Diamant, Martinique. Created by the artist Victor Anicet, Glissant's longtime friend.

== Death and legacy ==
Glissant died in Paris, France, on 3 February 2011, at the age of 82. Glissant published more than 20 books during his life.

== Bibliography ==
=== Essays ===
- Soleil de la conscience (Poétique I) (1956; Paris: Éditions Gallimard, 1997). Sun of Consciousness, trans. Nathanaël (New York: Nightboat Books, 2020).
- L'Intention poétique (Poétique II) (1969; Paris: Gallimard, 1997). Poetic Intention, trans. Nathalie Stephens (New York: Nightboat Books, 2010).
- Le Discours antillais (Éditions du Seuil, 1981; Paris: Gallimard, 1997). Caribbean Discourse: Selected Essays, trans. Michael Dash (University Press of Virginia, 1989; 1992).
- Poétique de la relation (Poétique III) (Paris: Gallimard, 1990). Poetics of Relation, trans. Betsy Wing (University of Michigan Press, 1997).
- Discours de Glendon (Éditions du GREF, 1990). Includes bibliography by Alain Baudot.
- Introduction à une poétique du divers (1995; Paris: Gallimard, 1996). Introduction to a Poetics of Diversity, trans. Celia Britton (Liverpool University Press, 2020).
- Faulkner, Mississippi (Paris: Stock, 1996; Gallimard, 1998). Trans. Barbara Lewis and Thomas C. Spear (Farrar Straus Giroux, 1999; University of Chicago Press, 2000).
- Racisme blanc (Paris: Gallimard, 1998).
- Traité du tout-monde (Poétique IV) (Paris: Gallimard, 1997). Treatise on the Whole-World, trans. Celia Britton (Liverpool University Press, 2020).
- La Cohée du Lamentin (Poétique V) (Paris: Gallimard, 2005).
- Ethnicité d'aujourd'hui (Paris: Gallimard, 2005).
- Une nouvelle région du monde (Esthétique I) (Paris: Gallimard, 2006). A New Region of the World: Aesthetics I, trans. Martin Munro (Liverpool University Press, 2023).
- Mémoires des esclavages (Paris: Gallimard, 2007). With an introduction by Dominique de Villepin.
- Quand les murs tombent. L'identité nationale hors-la-loi? (Paris: Galaade Editions, 2007). With Patrick Chamoiseau.
- La Terre magnétique: les errances de Rapa Nui, l'île de Pâques (Paris: Seuil, 2007). With Sylvie Séma.
- Les Entretiens de Baton Rouge (Paris: Gallimard, 2008). The Baton Rouge Interviews, with Alexandre Leupin. Trans. Katie M. Cooper (Liverpool University Press, 2020).

=== Poetry ===
- Un champ d'il̂es (Instance, 1953).
- La Terre inquiète (Éditions du Dragon, 1955).
- Les Indes (Falaize, 1956). The Indies, trans. Dominique O’Neill (Ed. du GREF, 1992).
- Le Sel noir (Seuil, 1960). Black Salt, trans. Betsy Wing (University of Michigan Press, 1999).
- Le Sang rivé (Présence africaine, 1961).
- Poèmes : un champ d'il̂es, La terre inquiète, Les Indes (Seuil, 1965).
- Boises : histoire naturelle d'une aridité (Acoma, 1979).
- Le Sel noir; Le Sang rivé; Boises (Gallimard, 1983).
- Pays rêvé, pays réel (Seuil, 1985).
- Fastes (Ed. du GREF, 1991).
- Poèmes complets (Gallimard, 1994). The Collected Poems of Edouard Glissant, trans. Jeff Humphreys (University of Minnesota Press, 2005).
  - Includes: Le sang rivé; Un champ d'îles; La terre inquiète; Les Indes; Le sel noir; Boises; Pays rêvé, pays réel; Fastes; Les grands chaos.
- Le Monde incréé; Conte de ce que fut la Tragédie d'Askia; Parabole d'un Moulin de Martinique; La Folie Célat (Gallimard, 2000).
  - Poems followed by three texts from 1963, 1975 and 1987.

=== Novels ===
- La Lézarde (Seuil, 1958; Gallimard, 1997). The Ripening, trans. Frances Frenaye (George Braziller, 1959) and later by Michael Dash (Heinemann, 1985).
- Le Quatrième siècle (Seuil, 1964). The Fourth Century, trans. Betsy Wing (University of Michigan Press, 2001).
- Malemort (Seuil, 1975; Gallimard, 1997).
- La Case du commandeur (Seuil, 1981; Gallimard, 1997). The Overseer's Cabin, trans. Betsy Wing (University of Nebraska Press, 2011).
- Mahagony (Seuil, 1987; Gallimard, 1997). Mahagony, trans. Betsy Wing (University of Nebraska Press, 2021).
- Tout-monde (Gallimard, 1993).
- Sartorius: le roman des Batoutos (Gallimard, 1999).
- Ormerod (Gallimard, 2003).

=== Theatre ===
- Monsieur Toussaint (Seuil, 1961; Gallimard, 1998). Trans. Joseph G. Foster and Barbara A. Franklin (Three Continents Press, 1981) and later by Michael Dash (Lynne Rienner Publishers, 2005).

=== Interviews with Glissant ===
- 1998: "Nous sommes tous des créoles", interview in Regards (January).
- 1998: "De la poétique de la relation au tout-monde", interview in Atalaia.
- 1998: "Penser l’abolition", Le Monde (24 April)
- 1998: "L’Europe et les Antilles", interview in Mots Pluriels, No. 8 (October)
- 1998: interview in Le Pelletier, C. (ed.), Encre noire - la langue en liberté, Guadeloupe-Guyane-Martinique: Ibis Rouge.
- 2000: "La «créolisation» culturelle du monde", interview in Label France [BROKEN LINK]
- 2010: "Édouard Glissant: one world in relation", film by Manthia Diawara

== See also ==
- Caribbean poetry
- Caribbean literature
- Postcolonial literature
