= Sebastián Lemba =

Dominican pirate and maroon leader

- Born: c.1504 – 1505; Southeast Africa
- Died: September 25, 1547 or September 25, 1548; San Juan de la Maguana, Captaincy General of Santo Domingo (now San Juan de la Maguana, Dominican Republic)
- Cause of death: Execution
- Other name: Juan Sebastián Lemba Calembo
- Occupation: Maroon leader
- Years active: 1532 - 1547
- Awards: National hero

Sebastián Lemba (fl. 1540s) was an early Dominican slave rebel leader who led a prolonged maroon rebellion in the colony of Santo Domingo (present day Dominican Republic). He is remembered as a significant figure in Dominican history, as that his actions paved the way for the eventual liberation of the Dominicans from their Spanish oppressors.

Born in Africa, a member of the Lemba tribe, hence the name. When Lemba was a young man he was captured and taken to companies in France and Spain around the year 1525, and was eventually transferred to the island of Hispaniola. Furiously tired of the harsh endurance of slavery, Lemba decided to revolt against the Spanish crown in 1532, which succeeded. After their uprising, they escaped to the island's rugged, mountainous interior and began a war against the Spanish authorities with the ultimate goal of freeing Hispaniola from the clutches of slavery.

Lemba and his group were soon joined other enslaved Africans who had also escaped, operated as an army. Lemba was known for his tactical prowess and his ability to outmaneuver Spanish soldiers. The Lemba revolt lasted 15 years until his capture in 1547 or 1548, and is recognized as one of the first cases of Maroon resistance in the Americas. The revolt was defined by guerrilla tactics, including hit-and-run attacks against Spanish plantations and settlements. Lemba and his comrades raided Spanish settlements, freeing other enslaved Africans, stealing food and supplies, and sabotaging the colonial economy. The revolt resulted in significant losses for the Spanish and attracted the attention of neighboring maroon communities, who saw it as a potential model for their own resistance against colonial rule.

Although Lemba did not live to see the eventual liberation of the Dominicans from Spanish colonial rule in 1821, his legacy lived on. He was remembered as a hero who fought for freedom and justice, and the memory of him was an inspiration to others who continued to fight for a better future. Today, Lemba is remembered as a folk hero in the fight against colonialism and slavery in the Caribbean. His rebellion and the role he played in the history of the Dominican Republic, in which continues to be celebrate and remember Lemba's legacy.

== Origins ==
=== Background ===
While the exact date and place of birth is still unknown, some historians agree that he was born in West Africa and may have been born at some point between 1504 and 1505. His mother was of the Lemba tribe, and his father was of the Calembo tribe of the Kongo people, which would explain his surnames. Some researchers claim that Lemba's father may have been of African royalty in his tribe.

At some point around 1525, a young Lemba was captured and brought to the Caribbean island called Hispaniola, during which at the time was governed by Spain as the colony of Santo Domingo, the first colony of the New World.

The island was previously inhabited by the Taínos, an Arawak-speaking indigenous tribe of the Caribbean, for some couple thousands of years. The Tainos called the island Quisqueya and Aytí. They lived mostly in peace, but their peace was often disrupted due to constant harassment from the Caribs, another indigenous tribe. These events transpired so much that by the time of European contact, many of the Taínos were seeking for protection. Their lives change in 1492, when the Italian explorer Christopher Columbus arrived on the island and claimed the island for Spain, to which they renamed it Hispaniola. Relations between the Taíno and the Spanish colonists started off warm, but they quickly soured as the Spanish began to forcibly deprive the natives of their gold, subject them to slavery, and inflicted terror on the population, thereby causing the Tainos to fight back. These resistances from the Taínos continued to intensify, resulting in a series of bloody wars between them and the Spanish colonists.

Eventually by the beginning of the 1500s, the Taino population was nearly decimated, mostly due to diseases. Warfare, abuse and intermixing with the Spaniards also contributed to their decline. But by this time, Taíno slavery had been outlawed, due to the intervention of Dominican friar, Bartolomé de Las Casas, who instead suggested to the Spanish crown to import enslaved Africans for the labor. This action made Santo Domingo the first colony to do so.

The first Africans to arrive on the island were known as Black Ladinos. These Christianized Africans, who were completely assimilated into the Spanish culture, were brought into the island to replace the Taínos. But just as with the Taínos, life for the newly arrived Africans in the colony was just as hellish. From being forced into harsh labor on the plantations, having absolutely no rights or freedom, and having to endure racial animosity was a nightmarish experience. This pushed them enough to escape from the plantations, while others planned to stage an uprising.

On December 25, 1521, Maria Olofa and Gonzalo Mandinga, a romantic couple, led the first major slave revolt in the Americas. This revolt lasted for a year until being brutally crushed by the Admiral in December 1522. Laws were introduced to prevent more rebellions and uprising from transpiring, even enforcing harsh punishments on those who wished to stage another revolt. But unfortunate for the Spaniards, many of the slaves successfully escaped to establish independent Maroon communities. This revolt laid the foundation of rebellions on the island, which in turn would result in more uprisings to transpire not only in the island, but the entire Americas.

=== Life as a slave ===
Lemba, who had been captured by the Spanish, arrived in the colony to work on the plantations. Lemba' s work consisted looking for gold, and move sugar mills to grine the cane and extract the guarapo for sweetning. These machines required at least several slaves. Unfortunately for the slaves, they had absolutely no freedom and were forced to obey their masters will, who often mistreated and abused the slaves. From so much mistreatment and poor working conditions, this was enough for Lemba to begin plotting a rebellion against his colonial masters.

== Rebellion ==
Lemba and a group of slaves rose up against the Spanish colony around the year 1532. They escaped and went to the mountainous interior of the island and for several years fought against the Spanish authorities.

Lemba and his group were soon joined by other rebelling slaves. There were estimated to be around 150 and 400 men fighting in the rebellion. Legendary names like Diego Guzmán, Juan Criollo and Diego del Ocampo were counted among his ranks. Lemba and these men operated like an army. They went throughout villages, ransacking and attacking the Spaniards while liberating other slaves. His army moved at night, devastating the properties of Higüey, San Juan de la Maguana and Azua. In this last town, under the cover of night, they attacked the Cepicepi Mill, owned by Diego Caballero, while the nine Spaniards who were there slept peacefully in some huts.

Captain Tristán de Leguizamón was finally able to enter the maniel - or house or community of the maroon - of Lemba in Baoruco Viejo. But the leader was not in the maniel, however, the Spanish captain took with him the women, the provisions and all the weapons he found in it. When Leguizamón retired to Azua, Lemba entered San Juan and plundered it, taking all the iron from the sugar mills to make weapons. He then returned to the maniel again and continued his adventures.

It was then that Lemba becomes the most wanted man by the Spanish, and also most respected and feared. The hills of San Juan and Bahoruco Viejo were the places of his resistance. The attack on the sugar mills multiplied, as did the burning of the planted sugarcane. The Spaniards, realizing the economy threatened, face the possibility of a marroon takeover of the island. But the expeditions against the black captain fail, one after another.

== Death ==
Ultimately, on September 25, 1547, Lemba was captured. The circumstances, place and precise date of his death are unclear, however, some sources point to a time period somewhere between 1547 and 1548, in San Juan de la Maguana or elsewhere in the South of the country. But it is also said that he died in Santo Domingo, where he was captured and taken after he was killed in one of the city gates between Fort San Pedro and the Puerta del Conde.

== Legacy ==
=== Significance to the Spaniards of Santo Domingo ===
The actions of Sebastián Lemba have a particular historical significance, as he was one of the first African slaves to begin the fight against slavery throughout the Americas. He was one of the first to free, organize, and begin an unequal armed rebellion against the imposition of the Spanish Empire through its governorship in the New World conquered by the Imperial Force on the island of Santo Domingo. His warlike affront, his raids, and burning of plantations and sugar fields, in addition to the liberation of the slaves found wherever he was constituted the manor focus of resistance faced by the settlers on the island during the colonial period. These revolutionary actions of Lemba accumulated into a long period of fear and suspense within the Spanish authorities.

Lemba then became a symbol of black liberation during the Spanish colonial period. When slaves saw Lemba' s troops arriving at the farms and plantations where they served, they trembled with joy at the same time while changing, "We are saved, the Captain arrived." At that moment, Lemba became the precursor of the liberty and destiny of the slaves. Following his death, the Spanish authorities believed that the rebellions would cease. But this proved to be false as the ideals of the embattled Lemba were sustained over time, thus inspiring future slave rebellions as well as new generations of slaves following his libertarian example. Many years after his death, some of the older men from the havens, especially one named Don Tomas Almonte, conversed with both free slaves and new slaves alike. He spoke the live of nature and had even spoke of the African gods that protected and the need to maintain unity in the havens. When speaking of the past rebel leaders, his voice would distress and his eyes moistened when he spoke of Lemba. He said to them:

It has been years since Lemba the leader of the rebels departed from this land blessed by Chango. I want to repeat to you something that Lemba always told our people. "Its important to be here as free as the wind, but its not to just to escape from the white Spaniards. We can't be satisfied with getting here to the havens and stay calm. We have to attack the Spanish down there in the mills, attack their interest, hit them where it hurts them the most, and free the other negros who are being held there as slaves."

Lemba' s sacrifice for the life and liberty of others served as an example and inspiration for the freedom of blacks and native slaves in Santo Domingo.

Lemba is revered as a national hero in the Dominican Republic with a statue in his honor.

=== Impact on future conflicts ===
Lemba, who was also called the Maroon leader, was the most important anti-slavery rebel leader that Santo Domingo had during the colonial period, among which also stood out were Diego de Ocampo, Diego del Guzman, and Juan Vaquero. He led a rebellion in unequal conditions against slavery and forced labor without pay, to which the Spanish settlers had subjected his entire race and Taíno Indians who inhabited the island of Santo Domingo. With his unshakeable fights for freedom of his kind, Lemba was a true precursor of anti-slavery and liberation in Santo Domingo, and the American continent in the era in which he lived. His actions and his example for freedom developed by the future generations, centuries later in the island of Santo Domingo.

A fundamental part of Lemba's legacy is constituted also by the spirit of rebellion against abuse, shame, and oppression of Dominicans by foreign rule. His actions were a spark of inspiration for hundreds of thousands of slaves in Santo Domingo, who like Lemba, rebelled against the mistreatment and abuse of the Spanish colonists over the next 3 centuries. These insurrection included those led by Diego de Ocampo, Diego del Guzman, Juan Vaquero, Juan Criollo, and Fernando Montoro. These also consisted of large scale rebellions such as the Boca de Nigua rebellion in October 1796. These actions paved the way for the eventual liberation of the Dominicans from Spanish oppression, led by José Núñez de Caceres, later accumulating into the national independence led by Juan Pablo Duarte, Francisco del Rosario Sánchez, and Matías Ramón Mella.

=== African heritage in the Dominican Republic ===
The Africans brought as slaves to the island of Santo Domingo during the colonial period left a profound influence on Dominican society. It had enriched the cultural heritage of the Dominican Republic due to the sound of the drums to Dominican vernacular music and introduced African rhythms to Dominican dance. This cultural legacy has been globally recognized by UNESCO as Intangible Heritage of the Africanism in the Americas and the world. Of the 90 elements of these monuments recognized by UNO as Intangible Africanism, two correspond to the Dominican Republic: one is the celebration of the Confraternity of Villa Mella's Holy Spirit of the Congos, and the other is the traditional celebration of the San Pedro's dance theaters of Cocolos.

== Military capacity ==
The listeners Grajeda and Zorita came to say that Lemba was extremely skilled and very knowledgeable in matters of war, while Juan de Castellanos, in verses typical of a slave driver, expressed himself about him in the following terms:

The black Lemba was mainly, that he gathered more than four hundred blacks, leading them manfully; He was black with perverse thoughts, daring, sagacious, strong, brave, and in his rebellion of many years the earth suffered notable damage.

== See also ==
- Atlantic slave trade
- Slavery in colonial Spanish America
- Slave rebellion
- Maroons
- History of the Dominican Republic
- Captaincy General of Santo Domingo
- 1521 Santo Domingo Slave Revolt
- Afro-Dominicans
