= Diego del Ocampo =

Dominican Maroon leader

Diego del Ocampo (fl. 1540s) was a Dominican Maroon leader who fought for many years under another slave leader, Sebastián Lemba, leading one of the earliest slave rebellions in the Americas.

== Maroonage ==
Before the development of the sugar industry in the Dominican Republic, the existence of slaves was minimal on the island. It was Bartolomé de las Casas and the Dominican friars who suggested that black African slaves be brought in to alleviate the fate of the Indians, who could not stand the harsh working conditions in the sugar mills and mills. The encomenderos also requested the Jerónimos fathers to bring in slaves in order to put them to work in the mills. The slaves were forced to perform intense physical labor in the mills. Those who tried to resist were punished severely and unjustifiably, so this situation led them to rebel and run away.

The insurrection of the blacks was called Cimarronada and the villages that they formed in the mountains of Ocoa and Bahoruco were called Palenques or Manieles. The first insurrection in the new world took place on December 25, 1521, when about 40 members of the Wolof tribe burned down the sugar mill of Diego Columbus and María de Toledo called La Nueva Isabela, located on the banks of the Nizao River and in a ranch of Melchor de Castro, killing 12 Spaniards. The insurgents were overtaken before reaching Azua by Melchor de Castro and a group of settlers, who defeated them and caused six deaths and many injuries. Several of those who survived the battle were hanged along the Nizao-Haina road, which was the main sugarcane area at the time and their corpses were left there to intimidate the others and give up any idea of rebellion.

Some time after this, Diego de Ocampo led an insurrection of his own, and would carry out raids and destruction of sugar mills took place in the areas of what is now the Dominican Republic in the early 1500s. He would become a prominent fighter of the anti-slavery movement on the island of Santo Domingo along with Sebastián Lemba, Juan Vaquero, Diego de Guzmán, Fernando Montoro and others. In the 1530s, Lemba rebelled with a group of runaway slaves, fighting for more than 10 years in the mountains of what is now Pico Diego de Ocampo. This slave taught his pursuers the places where the palenques were and the combat tactics used by the rebels, which greatly facilitated their defeat. It must be remembered that slaves used to give themselves the names of their masters or of the place of origin or of the profession they practiced.

Then, in 1542–1546, there was another great insurrection of thousands of black slaves. The slave owners came to fear that the rebels would take over the entire island. To prevent this from happening, Charles I dismissed the licensed priest Alonso de Fuen Mayor from the governorship and appointed an experienced soldier sent from Spain, Alonso López de Serrato, to that post. Upon his arrival, he made a kind of tactical truce to organize anti-guerrilla squads that, once ready for combat, dedicated themselves to attacking the palenques and killing all the human beings they found there.

In the end, when Ocampo saw himself closely pursued by anti-guerrilla squads, he made a pact with the slave owners in exchange for the pardon of his life and money. However, when he rebelled again, he was killed.

== Historiography ==
According to reports from 1546, Diego Guzmán was one of the first to be killed in 1545, and Sebastián Lemba was one of the last two rebel leaders to die in combat. In September 1548, near San Juan de la Maguana, he was killed by a slave who had been given his freedom for that act. The other was Juan Vaquero, killed in 1554. However, despite the significant losses in the following two and a half centuries, there were always runaway slaves and palenques, especially in the Bahoruco and Neiba mountain ranges, but never with the strength of those that occurred in the years 1542.

== See also ==
- 1521 Santo Domingo Slave Revolt
- Sebastián Lemba
- Maroons
- Afro-Dominicans

== Bibliography ==
- Domínguez, Jaime de Jesús: Historia Dominicana, Jaime de Jesús Domínguez, ABC editions, Santo Domingo, 2001-2005
