= Brigand Wars =

The Brigand Wars was a series of conflicts in the 1790s across the Caribbean between enslaved people (and their French allies) and the British empire. The best known and most successful of these was the Haitian Revolution, although many similar uprisings took place on many Caribbean islands.

== Historical context ==
In the second half of the 18th-century, the British and French empires fought for territory in the Caribbean. A few islands remained independent of foreign control, such as Saint Vincent, which was occupied mainly by indigenous Kalinago people and Black Caribs. These pockets remained as third parties in Britain and France's larger conflict, allying themselves with whoever was convenient in a particular moment.

However, in general, the French had better relations with the indigenous people, with St. Vincent having strong cultural ties to Martinique (France's colonial headquarters) and the Kalinago rulers learning French. When Britain claimed control over the Westward islands, France supplied the native people with weapons and soldiers from Martinique.

Tensions were further inflamed during France's 1789 Revolution. Slavery was widespread throughout the Caribbean, both within the French and British empires, but the concept of slavery was approached differently by both. French slaveowners tended to free their mixed-race offspring, including the mothers of these children, whereas this was an uncommon practice in the British empire. As a result, the French Caribbean had a much higher proportion of free people of color.

As early as the mid-18th-century, enslaved Caribbean people began meeting to demand their freedom and equality. Fugitive slaves who escaped their plantations to live in the rural woods were often called "maroons." About half of maroons were women. The French Revolution's promise of equality for all inspired many to demand their emancipation, as well as fostered loyalty from Saint Lucia, one of the French empire's colonies in the Caribbean. Not all Caribbean islands supported the French Revolution; Martinique and Dominica, for instance, reportedly refused to welcome French Revolutionary officials to their island.

== Timeline ==
In 1787, about 1/3 of the landowners on Saint Lucia were free people of color, although the amount of land they owned compared to their white counterparts was significantly less. By 1790, approximately 1,600 Saint Lucians were free people of color, nearly identical to the number of whites on the island.

=== England and France begin war (1793) ===
In March 1793, England and France began war. With the French Revolution as its backdrop, Britain invaded France. By shifting the main conflict to the Caribbean, France was able to distract England from the fighting in mainland Europe. For the British empire, they hoped to invalidate the ideals expressed by the French Revolution and expand their power in the Western hemisphere.

The goals of local people in the Caribbean looked different from their continental Europe counterparts. French and British settlers both did not want to lose their land to one another, and indigenous and Black Caribbean people did not want to continue being enslaved under the British empire.

=== French abolishment of slavery (1794) ===
On February 4, 1794, the French Republic abolished slavery throughout its colonies and gave the newly freed people citizenship. This decision sparked excitement amongst the previously enslaved people of the French Caribbean, to the dismay of the British empire, which still allowed slavery.

However, by the fall of 1794, Saint Lucia was retaken by the British empire, where slavery was still legal. Armies of fugitive slaves, British deserters, and French republicans formed in the rural countryside and called themselves L'Armee Francaise dans les Bois (transl. the French Army in the Woods). To many of the fugitive slaves, the French Republic represented their freedom. The British referred to this group as "brigands," a term meant to be insulting and belittling.

The Brigands had multiple advantages over the foreign British troops: they were familiar with the geography of the area and operated primarily out of rural settings, and the British were susceptible to tropical diseases that they did not have immunity for. They also practiced guerrilla warfare that suited mountainous environments.

The British troops on St. Lucia were quickly overwhelmed, and they sent for the Black Carolina Corps, a group of fugitive slaves and free people of color that fought for the British during the American Revolution, to come from Martinique to help their cause. They combined forces with the Black Rangers, Royalist-aligned slaves from French Martinique.

=== Takeover of Guadeloupe (1794) ===
The British empire took over Martinique in 1794. Victor Hugues, a French colonial administrator and ally of Robespierre, was sent to Guadeloupe to retake France's land in the Caribbean. From Martinique, British troops traveled to Guadeloupe, where they encountered Hugues and his Republican goals for the Caribbean. Hugues' squadron attacked the British troops in Basseterre and forced the British entirely off of Guadeloupe in 1795. Nearly 1,000 Royalists were killed in this conflict. The French stronghold on Guadeloupe proved to be strategically important, as it was a vital source of supplies for the Brigand resistance.

=== St. Lucia: Battle of Rabot (1795) ===
The Battle of Rabot was one of the most significant battles of the Brigand War for its sheer impact and casualties. In 1795, the British occupation in St. Lucia had been facing numerous isolated attacks by the Brigand army. Citoyen Goyrand had been enlisted by Hugues to retake St. Lucia from the British. On April 22, 1795, Goyrand and L'Armee Francaise dans les Bois led an attack on ___ from their encampments on Gros Piton. The Brigand army was led by the escaped slave Flore Bois Gaillard, today a national heroine of St. Lucia. The battle lasted eight hours, and the British lost over a hundred men. Brigands set fire to the plantations, plundered towns and villages, and according to some accounts, killed their former masters. The remaining British escaped to Pigeon Island, but they had been forced off St. Lucia entirely by June 1795.

By 1796, St. Lucia's population consisted of 900 whites and 13,000 Blacks. It has been estimated that the casualties for the Brigand's army was about 5,000 men and 1,000 women.

=== Jamaican uprisings ===
Jamaica, of all the islands in the Caribbean, had the largest concentration of enslaved people in the 1790s. Refugees from the Haitian Revolution began to arrive during the decade, publicizing the nearby slave revolt and drastically increasing the island's population. Slaves began to speak of freedom, worrying British settlers. Five different communities of maroons lived in the mountainous regions of the island, serving as a symbol of liberation for Jamaica's quarter of a million slaves. In 1792, a group of mixed-race people petitioned the government for equal rights, which was to be partially met in 1796. In 1795, in what was called the Second Maroon War, the largest maroon community, Trelawny Town, engaged in guerrilla warfare to destroy British plantations. This, combined with disease, weakened British troops. Fighting lasted until March 1796, when the British regained control of the island.

=== Second Carib War (1795—1797) ===
The Second Carib War took place on St. Vincent from 1795—1797.

=== British retake of St. Lucia (1797) ===
Although the British occupation of St. Lucia had lasted only one year (1794—1795), the British troops fought to take back the island. They used the scorched earth military strategy in the hopes that it would force the Brigand army out of rural areas. Britain also began to rely more heavily on Black troops, the West India Regiments, to improve their numbers. In 1797, L'Armee Francaise dans les Bois surrendered to British forced on the condition that they not be re-enslaved. Britain sent them to Sierra Leone and made them part of the West India Regiments there. Back on St. Lucia, Britain successfully re-established slavery until its abolishment in the 1830s. St. Lucia remained in British control for nearly 200 more years, until its independence in 1979.
