= Nigua Sugar Mill =

- Interactive map of Nigua Sugar Mill

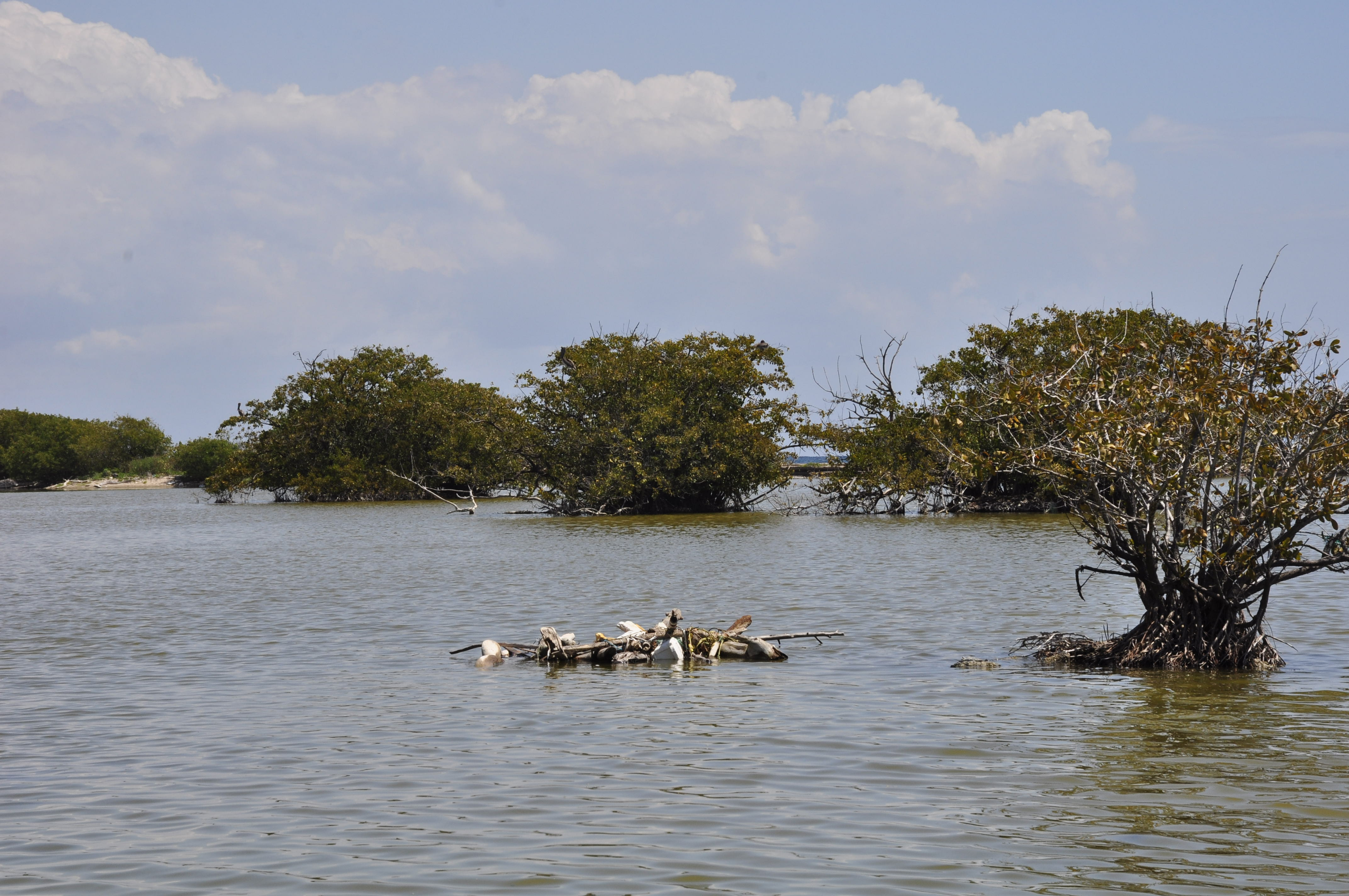
Boca de Nigua Wetland, San Cristóbal, Dominican Republic

The Nigua Sugar Mill, Boca de Nigua, is located 13 km to the west of Santo Domingo, the capital of the Dominican Republic, in Santo Domingo Province. Founded by the Marquis De Aranda, but later owned by Juan Bautista Ollarazaba, the site was once an important production facility in the regional sugar industry. It exhibits a mill and boiling room, as well as some historic Spanish colonial architecture. This site was added to the UNESCO World Heritage Tentative List on November 21, 2001 in the Cultural category.
