= Bush War =

The Bush War may refer to:

- The Bush War (guerre des bois) broke out in the year 1795 in Saint Lucia
- The Rhodesian Bush War, a conflict in Rhodesia (now Zimbabwe) between the white minority government of Ian Smith and the black nationalists of the ZANU and ZAPU movements
- The South African Border War, also known as the Angola Bush War or the Namibian War of Independence, a conflict from 1966 to 1989 in South-West Africa (now Namibia) and Angola
- The Ugandan Bush War, a guerrilla war in Uganda waged by the National Resistance Army against the governments of Milton Obote and Tito Okello between 1981 and 1986
- The War in Afghanistan, a United States–led war in response to the September 11 attacks, during the presidency of George W. Bush
- The Iraq War, another US-led armed conflict under George W. Bush in response to the September 11 attacks
- The Central African Republic Bush War, a war in the Central African Republic, between 2004 and 2007
