= Felipillo of Panama =

Leader of runaway slaves in Colonial Panama

Felipillo (d. 1551), was the leader of runaway slaves in Colonial Panama.

Felipillo was a Spanish-speaking (Black Ladino) slave who managed a boat for the pearl fisheries on the Pearl Islands in the Gulf of Panama. In 1549, he led a revolt in which slaves fled the islands as well as cattle ranches on the mainland, and then fled up into the mountains. From their base, Felipillo and his followers raided Spanish ranches and travelers until 1551 when he and 30 of his followers were surprised and captured by Captain Francisco Carreño. Felipillo was subsequently executed and the remainder of his followers sold back into slavery.
