= 1521 Santo Domingo Slave Revolt =

Slave rebellion on Hispaniola

- Part of The Slave Revolts in North America
- Date: December 25, 1521
- Location: Colony of Santo Domingo
- Goals: Liberation
- Result: Suppression of the revolt

Parties
Enslaved Africans	Slaveowners, Spanish colonial government

Lead figures
Maria Olofa (Wolofa) and Gonzalo Mandinga	Diego Columbus

Outcome
- Effects: Introduction of new laws to control the enslaved population

The 1521 Santo Domingo Slave Revolt in the Spanish colony of Santo Domingo on the island of Hispaniola took place around the time of Christmas festivities in 1521. It is the earliest recorded slave rebellion in the Americas. Just days after the rebellion, the colonial authorities introduced a set of laws to prevent another uprising. These are thought to be the earliest surviving laws created to control enslaved Africans in the New World.

The rebellion started on the Nueva Isabela sugar plantation (located today in the northwestern outskirts of Santo Domingo city) owned by the colony's governor Diego Columbus, son of Christopher Columbus. The text of 1522 slave laws describe that a "certain number" of slaves "agreed to rebel and rebelled with intention and purpose to kill all the Christians they could and to free themselves and take over the land." The historical documents present the uprising as well-planned and coordinated action. Local oral tradition says that the rebellion was led by Maria Olofa (Wolofa) and Gonzalo Mandinga, a romantic couple, both Muslims from the Wolof nation.

On January 6 of 1522 (Day of the Three Kings also known as Ephiphany), just days after the uprising, Columbus as governor, introduced strict laws designed to prevent the "Black and slaves" from uprising again. These are thought to be some of the earliest laws created to control enslaved Africans in the New World. The 1522 laws restricted the physical movements of the enslaved, prohibited the enslaved from bearing arms and accessing weapons, required enslavers to keep strict slave registers, and introduced harsh punishment in the form of physical torture and execution.

There is some disagreement by historians on the precise date of the rebellion. Some historical sources state the rebellion took place on the first or second day of Christmas. Contemporary historians generally mark the anniversary of the rebellion as December 25 or 26th, other sources mistakenly call it the "1522 slave rebellion".

== See also ==
- Slave rebellion
- Maroons
- Atlantic Slave trade
- Sebastián Lemba

== Bibliography ==
- Albert Batista, Celsa. Africans on our island. Santo Domingo: Editora La Trinitaria, 2010. Collection of documents for the history of the social formation of Latin America, 1493-1810, Cédula (05/11/1526), CSIC, Madrid: 1953.
- Jesús Domínguez, Jaime. Dominican History. Santo Domingo: Editora ABC, 2001.
- Deive, Carlos Esteban. "Marronage in the Spanish Colony of Santo Domingo," Mar Océana, Journal of Spanish and Ibero-American Humanism. 2008, No. 24.
- “The slavery of black people in Santo Domingo (1492-1844)”. Museum of Dominican Man. Santo Domingo: editions of the Museum of Dominican Man. 1980.
- The black guerrillas: slaves, fugitives and maroons in Santo Domingo. Santo Domingo: Dominican Cultural Foundation, 1989.
- Fernández de Oviedo, Gonzalo. General and Natural History of the Indies (1478-1557), Volume I. Madrid: Printing Office of the Royal Academy of History, 1992.
- Franco Pichardo, Franklin. Blacks, Mulattoes and the Dominican Nation. Santo Domingo: 9th Edition, Editora Vidal, 1998.
- History of the Dominican People. Santo Domingo. Workshop Editor. Dominican Publishing Society, 1993.
- Guillot, Carlos Federico. Black Rebels and Black Maroons (African American profile in the history of the New World). Buenos Aires: Editora Francisco Colombo, 1961.
- Gómez Bastar, Sergio. Investigation methodology. Mexico: Third Milenio Network, 2012. Hobsbawm, Eric. Bandits. Barcelona, Editora Crítica, 2001.
- Hugh, Thomas. The Slave Trade:A History of the Traffic in Human Beings from 1440 to 1780. Barcelona: Editorial Planeta, 1997.
- Lévi-Strauss, Claude, Race et Histoire Race et Culture. Paris. (Ed UNESCO. Réédition). 2011.
- Niño Roja, Victor Manuel. Research methodology, Design and execution. Bogotá: Editions of the U, 2011.
- Pérez Tudela, Juan. The Armies of the Indies, and the origins of the policy of colonization, 1492-1505. (Madrid: Gonzalo Fernández de Oviedo Institute), 1956.
- Saco, José Antonio. History of the slavery of the African race in the New World and especially in the Hispanic-American countries. Volume I. Havana: Editora Cultural, 1938.
- Schoelcher, Victor. Esclavage et colonisation. Paris: Poof. 1948 (1st edition), 2007.
