= Flore Bois Gaillard =

18th-century St. Lucian freedom fighter

- Born: Saint Lucia
- Occupation: Revolutionary fighter
- Years active: 1795 — 1797
- Known for: Leading the Battle of Rabot

Flore Bois Gaillard was a fugitive enslaved woman who fought for freedom in late 18th-century Saint Lucia. She is best known for leading the Armée Française Dans Les Bois against the British at the Battle of Rabot in 1795.

== Early life ==
Little is known about Gaillard childhood, such as the year and location of her birth. Due to her mixed-race heritage, she was likely born to a Black woman who was impregnated by a white man, but her precise ethnic background is unknown. She first appears on the historical record as a mulatto enslaved woman who lived on Master Bellac's plantation towards the end of the 18th-century. According to some sources, during her time there, Bellac sexually abused her, but it is unclear if this is an invention of Édouard Glissant (who wrote a fictional account of her life), or rooted in history.

== Revolutionary life ==
Gaillard escaped the plantation in 1793 and traveled to rural St. Lucia where she met the Saint Lucian freedom fighters called the Maroons. She joined the Armée Française Dans Les Bois (transl. the French army in the woods), a military group composed of fugitive slaves, free people of color, French republicans who opposed the British, and British deserters. They desired to free Saint Lucia from the British colonizers who had recently taken over the land from the French. Gaillard quickly rose in the ranks and became an important military leader of the Armée Française Dans Les Bois.

=== The Battle of Brigands ===
The Battle of Brigands was fought from 1795—1797 between Gaillard's army of escaped slaves and the British. The inciting battle of the war was the Battle of Rabot on April 22, 1795, when plantations and estates across Saint Lucia were raided and destroyed. Approximately 200 British were killed. The battle was in response to atrocities committed by the British four years prior in 1791. During the Battle of Rabot, Gaillard supposedly killed her former master Bellac and burned down his plantation.

With the help of Victor Hugues, Gaillard and the Armée Française Dans Les Bois' success led to the eventual desertion of the island by British and Royalist slave owners for a couple of years. In 1797, the British took back the island, and the Africans who fought against the British were sent to Sierra Leone, where they fought in the West India Regiment.

== Legacy ==
To this day, it is unknown whether Gaillard survived the war. However, Gaillard remains an important figure in both St. Lucian and Caribbean national identity, and the mountain Piton Flore is named for her.

Gaillard is featured in Édouard Glissant's 2003 novel Ormerod, where she is the central heroine. Glissant imagined that Gaillard suffered sexual abuse by the hands of her former owner Bellac, upon whom she later takes revenge and kills during the Battle of Rabot. In Glissant's novel, Gaillard is publicly executed after the British retake the island in 1797.
