= Deaths in January 2010 =

The following is a list of notable deaths in January 2010.

Entries for each day are listed alphabetically by surname. A typical entry lists information in the following sequence:

- Name, age, country of citizenship at birth, subsequent country of citizenship (if applicable), reason for notability, cause of death (if known), and reference.

== January 2010 ==
=== 1 ===
- Gary Brockette, 67, American actor (The Last Picture Show) and assistant director, cancer.
- Chauncey H. Browning Jr., 75, American politician, West Virginia Attorney General (1969–1985).
- Jean Carroll, 98, American comedian (The Ed Sullivan Show).
- P. Chandrasekaran, 52, Sri Lankan politician, Member of Parliament, after short illness.
- Lhasa de Sela, 37, American singer, breast cancer.
- Michael Dwyer, 58, Irish journalist and film critic, lung cancer.
- Alfredo Mario Espósito Castro, 82, Argentinian Roman Catholic Bishop of Zárate-Campana (1976–1991).
- John Freeman, 93, American animator (The Smurfs) and animation director (My Little Pony and Friends).
- Bingo Gazingo, 85, American performance poet, struck by car.
- Adrien Gilbert, 78, Canadian Olympic weightlifter
- Richard Kindleberger, 67, American newspaper reporter (The Boston Globe), brain tumor.
- John Lyon, 58, British cricketer.
- Jack Middleton, 92, British Olympic swimmer.
- Tetsuo Narikawa, 65, Japanese actor (Spectreman) and karate instructor, lung cancer.
- Marlene Neubauer-Woerner, 91, German sculptor.
- Libuše Patočková, 76, Czech Olympic cross-country skier.
- Stanisław Przybylski, 79, Polish modern pentathlete.
- Mohamed Rahmat, 71, Malaysian politician, Information Minister (1978–1982, 1987–1999).
- Faisal Bin Shamlan, 75, Yemeni politician, presidential candidate (2006), cancer.
- Billy Arjan Singh, 92, Indian author.
- Gregory Slay, 40, American rock drummer (Remy Zero), songwriter (Nip/Tuck theme), cystic fibrosis.
- Freya von Moltke, 98, German World War II resistance fighter.
- John Shelton Wilder, 88, American politician, Lieutenant Governor of Tennessee (1971–2007), stroke.
- Vera Zakharova, 89, first Yakut woman to fly a plane

=== 2 ===
- Johann Frank, 71, Austrian football player (FK Austria Wien).
- David Gerber, 86, American executive producer (Police Story, Police Woman), heart failure.
- William Green, 82, British aviation writer.
- Deborah Howell, 68, American journalist, The Washington Post ombudsman, hit by car.
- René Oreel, 87, Belgian cyclist.
- Augustine Paul, 65, Malaysian Federal Court judge, after chronic illness.
- David R. Ross, 51, Scottish historian, heart attack.
- Rajendra Shah, 96, Indian poet.

=== 3 ===
- Gus Alexander, 75, Scottish footballer (Workington).
- Gustavo Becerra-Schmidt, 84, Chilean composer, lung cancer.
- Margery Beddow, 72, American choreographer and dancer.
- Barry Blair, 56, Canadian comics artist and writer, brain aneurysm.
- Gianni Bonichon, 65, Italian bobsledder, Olympic silver medalist.
- Otto Breg, 60, Austrian Olympic bobsledder.
- Sir Ian Brownlie, 77, British barrister, traffic collision.
- Joyce Collins, 79, American jazz singer and pianist, pulmonary fibrosis.
- Mary Daly, 81, American radical feminist philosopher.
- Francis Gillingham, 93, British neurosurgeon.
- Ali Safi Golpaygani, 96, Iranian Marja', natural causes.
- Billy Harris, 58, American basketball player (Northern Illinois Huskies, San Diego Conquistadors), stroke.
- John Keith Irwin, 80, American sociologist.
- Eunice W. Johnson, 93, American director of Ebony Fashion Fair, widow of John H. Johnson, renal failure.
- Charles Kleibacker, 88, American fashion designer, pneumonia.
- Georges Martin, 94, French cyclist.
- Takis Michalos, 63, Greek Greece men's national water polo team water polo player and coach; cancer.
- Moti Nandi, 79, Indian writer and sports journalist.
- Geoffrey Reeve, 77, British film director.
- Isak Rogde, 62, Norwegian translator.
- Tibet, 78, French comics artist and writer.
- Bobby Wilkins, 87, American baseball player (Philadelphia Athletics).

=== 4 ===
- Olaug Abrahamsen, 81, Norwegian politician.
- Rosalie Abrams, 88, American feminist playwright, actress and activist, Alzheimer's disease.
- Paul Ahyi, 79, Togolese artist, designer of the flag of Togo.
- Lew Allen, 84, American USAF general, NSA Director (1973–1977), USAF Chief of Staff (1978–1982), rheumatoid arthritis.
- Knox Burger, 87, American editor, writer, and literary agent.
- Neil Christian, 66, British singer, cancer.
- Tony Clarke, 68, British musician and record producer (The Moody Blues), emphysema.
- Sandro de América, 64, Argentinian singer, complications from heart and lung transplant surgery.
- Donal Donnelly, 78, English-born Irish actor, cancer
- Hywel Teifi Edwards, 75, Welsh historian and writer, after short illness.
- Johan Ferrier, 99, Surinamese politician, President (1975–1980).
- Tadeusz Góra, 91, Polish pilot.
- Rory Markas, 54, American baseball radio announcer (Los Angeles Angels of Anaheim), heart attack.
- György Mitró, 79, Hungarian Olympic swimmer.
- Ludwig Wilding, 82, German artist.
- Tsutomu Yamaguchi, 93, Japanese survivor of Hiroshima and Nagasaki atomic bombings, stomach cancer.

=== 5 ===
- Abdul Azim al-Deeb, 80, Qatari professor (Qatar University).
- Beverly Aadland, 67, American actress, girlfriend of Errol Flynn, diabetes and heart failure.
- Daniel Kubert, 62, American mathematician.
- Bernard Le Nail, 63, French writer, historian, Breton language and cultural advocate, cerebral hemorrhage.
- Willie Mitchell, 81, American musician and record producer, cardiac arrest.
- Kenneth Noland, 85, American color field painter, kidney cancer.
- Courage Quashigah, 62, Ghanaian politician.
- Philippa Scott, 91, British conservationist.
- George Syrimis, 88, Cypriot finance minister (1988–1993).
- Toni Tecuceanu, 37, Romanian comedy actor, bacterial infection.
- Rolf Thieme, 65, German Olympic hockey player.
- George Willoughby, 95, American Quaker activist.

=== 6 ===
- Philippe Arthuys, 81, French composer and film director.
- David Giles, 83, British television director.
- Michael Goulder, 82, British biblical scholar.
- Michael Harper, 78, British priest of the Church of England and later of the Antiochian Orthodox Church.
- George Leonard, 86, American writer, editor and educator, pioneer of the Human Potential Movement, after long illness.
- Graham Leonard, 88, British Church of England Bishop of London (1981–1991), subsequently a Roman Catholic priest.
- Ivan Medek, 84, Czech music publicist, theorist and critic, collaborator of Václav Talich and Václav Havel.
- Harriet Miller, 90, American politician, mayor of Santa Barbara, California (1995–2001).
- Beniamino Placido, 80, Italian journalist and television critic.
- Hervé Prouzet, 89, French cyclist
- Kittu Suresh, 64, Indian cricketer.

=== 7 ===
- Wendall Anschutz, 71, American television newsman.
- Myrtle Aydelotte, 92, American nurse, professor and hospital administrator.
- Sándor Barcs, 97, Hungarian politician and sport executive, interim President of UEFA (1972–1973).
- Gerald Bordelon, 47, American convicted murderer, execution by lethal injection.
- Alexander Garnet Brown, 79, Canadian politician, member of the Nova Scotia House of Assembly (1969–1978).
- Bruria Kaufman, 91, Israeli physicist.
- Stephen Huneck, 61, American wood carving artist, suicide by gunshot.
- Kamal Mahsud, Pakistani Pashto language folk singer, gas leak.
- Alex Parker, 74, Scottish football player (Falkirk, Everton, Southport, Scotland) and manager, heart attack.
- Donald Edmond Pelotte, 64, American Roman Catholic Bishop of Gallup (1990–2008), first Native American bishop.
- James D Robertson, 78, Scottish painter and lecturer.
- Blanca Sánchez, 63, Mexican actress, kidney failure.
- Philippe Séguin, 66, French politician, heart attack.
- Jim White, 67, American professional wrestler, cancer.
- Hardy Williams, 78, American politician, Pennsylvania State Senator (1983–1998), Alzheimer's disease.

=== 8 ===
- Bob Blackburn, 85, American sports commentator (Seattle SuperSonics), pneumonia.
- Jean Charpentier, 74, Canadian journalist, press secretary for Prime Minister Pierre Trudeau, cancer.
- Art Clokey, 88, American stop motion animator (Gumby, Davey and Goliath), bladder infection.
- Piero De Bernardi, 83, Italian screenwriter.
- Tony Halme, 47, Finnish professional boxer, actor, wrestler and Member of Parliament (2003–2007), suicide by gunshot.
- Raymond Kamber, 79, Swiss Olympic sprint canoer.
- Slavka Maneva, 75, Macedonian writer and poet.
- Charles Massi, 57, Central African politician and rebel leader.
- Monica Maughan, 76, Australian actress, cancer.
- Jim Rimmer, 75, Canadian graphic designer, cancer.
- Gladstone Robinson, 66, Jamaican cricketer.
- Gerrit de Ruiter, 82, Dutch hockey player
- Otmar Suitner, 87, Austrian conductor.
- Hans L. Trefousse, 88, German-born American historian.
- Amir Vahedi, 48, Iranian-born American poker player, complications of diabetes.
- Sumner G. Whittier, 98, American politician, Lieutenant Governor of Massachusetts (1953–1957).

=== 9 ===
- Améleté Abalo, 47, Togolese national football team assistant coach, shot.
- John Ballem, 84, Canadian novelist.
- Amo Bessone, 93, American ice hockey player and coach.
- Juan Bidegaray, 90, Uruguayan Olympic sailor
- Gösta Bredefeldt, 74, Swedish actor.
- Franz-Hermann Brüner, 64, German head of OLAF, after long illness.
- Acúrsio Carrelo, 78, Portuguese footballer.
- Mark Ellidge, 69–70, British press photographer.
- Ken Genser, 59, American politician, mayor of Santa Monica, California, after long illness.
- Per N. Hagen, 73, Norwegian politician.
- Rupert Hamer, 39, British journalist, defence correspondent for the Sunday Mirror, improvised explosive device.
- Fatimah Hashim, 85, Malaysian politician, first female minister in the Malaysian government.
- Laura Chapman Hruska, 74, American writer, co-founder and editor in chief of Soho Press, cancer.
- Jack Kerness, 98, American art director, natural causes.
- Nadav Levitan, 64, Israeli film director and screenwriter, lung disease.
- Ronald Moore, 84, Canadian politician.
- Evgeni Paladiev, 61, Soviet-born Kazakh ice hockey player.
- Diether Posser, 87, German politician.
- Armand Razafindratandra, 84, Malagasy cardinal, archbishop of Antananarivo (1994–2005), fall.
- Vimcy, 84, Indian sports writer.
- Thomas Summers West, 82, Scottish chemist.

=== 10 ===
- Sir Donald Acheson, 83, British physician, Chief Medical Officer of England (1983–1991).
- Sailadhar Baruah, 68, Indian film producer, complications of diabetes.
- Mina Bern, 98, Polish-born American Yiddish theatre actor, heart failure.
- Bert Bushnell, 88, British Olympic gold medal-winning rower (1948).
- Carlos Bonilla Chávez, 86, Ecuadorian classical guitarist.
- Simon Digby, 77, Indian-born British scholar and linguist, pancreatic cancer.
- Danny Fitzgerald, 49–50, Irish hurler and Gaelic football player.
- Jan C. Gabriel, 69, American race track announcer, complications from polycystic kidney disease.
- Donald Goerke, 83, American executive (Campbell's Soup Company), created SpaghettiOs, heart failure.
- Dick Johnson, 84, American big band clarinetist (Artie Shaw Band), after short illness.
- Edward Linde, 67, American businessman, founder of Boston Properties, pneumonia.
- Frances Morrell, 72, British political adviser and educationalist, cancer.
- Ulf Olsson, 58, Swedish murderer, suicide by hanging.
- Bill Patterson, 87, Australian racing driver, natural causes.
- Jayne Walton Rosen, 92, American singer, Lawrence Welk's Champagne Lady (1940–1945), natural causes.
- Moisés Saba, 47, Mexican entrepreneur, helicopter crash.
- Dale Shewalter, 59, American teacher, founder of the Arizona Trail, cancer.
- Mano Solo, 46, French singer, ruptured aneurysm.
- Crispin Sorhaindo, 78, Dominican politician, President (1993–1998), cancer.
- Bojidar Spiriev, 77, Bulgarian-born Hungarian hydrologist and statistician, creator of IAAF scoring tables.
- Patcha Ramachandra Rao, 67, Indian Metallurgist and Administrator.
- Torbjørn Yggeseth, 75, Norwegian ski jumping athlete and official.

=== 11 ===
- Juliet Anderson, 71, American pornographic actress and movie producer.
- Aleksandr Androshkin, 62, Soviet Ukrainian sports shooter.
- Francisco Benkö, 99, German-born Argentine chess master.
- Robben Wright Fleming, 93, American president of the University of Michigan (1968–1978).
- Georgy Garanian, 75, Russian jazz saxophonist and bandleader, cardiac arrest.
- Dorothy Geeben, 101, American mayor of Ocean Breeze Park, Florida (since 2001), oldest active mayor in the U.S.
- Miep Gies, 100, Dutch humanitarian, protector of Anne Frank during World War II, complications from a fall.
- Mick Green, 65, British rock and roll guitarist (Johnny Kidd & The Pirates, Billy J. Kramer and the Dakotas).
- Andis Hadjicostis, 43, Cypriot CEO of Sigma TV, shot.
- Johnny King, 83, English footballer.
- Kurt Liebhart, 76, Austrian Olympic sprint canoer.
- Harry Männil, 89, Estonian-born Venezuelan businessman.
- Bob Noorda, 82, Dutch-born Italian graphic designer.
- Éric Rohmer, 89, French film director.
- Joe Rollino, 104, American strongman, weightlifter, and boxer, struck by van.
- Ed Scott, 92, American baseball scout.
- Dennis Stock, 81, American photographer (Magnum Photos), colon and liver cancer.
- Gordon Van Tol, 49, Canadian Olympic water polo player, heart attack.

=== 12 ===
- Masoud Alimohammadi, 50, Iranian nuclear scientist, bomb blast.
- Miloslav Bělonožník, 91, Czech Olympic ski jumper.
- Daniel Bensaïd, 63, French philosopher and Trotskyist activist.
- Ken Colbung, 78, Australian Aboriginal elder, after short illness.
- Shirley Bell Cole, 89, American voice actor (Little Orphan Annie).
- Miguel Ángel de la Flor, 85, Peruvian army officer and politician.
- Colin Dettmer, 51, South African cricketer.
- Altan Dinçer, 77, Turkish Olympic basketball player.
- Krisda Arunvongse na Ayudhya, 78, Thai architect, Governor of Bangkok (1996–2001), coronary artery disease.
- Fred Krone, 79, American stuntman, cancer.
- Elizabeth Laverick, 85, British engineer.
- Hillis Layne, 91, American Major League Baseball player (1941, 1944–1945).
- Alastair Martin, 94, American tennis player, member of the Hall of Fame, President of the United States Tennis Association (1969–1970).
- Sir Allen McClay, 77, British pharmaceutical company founder, cancer.
- Elizabeth Moody, 70, New Zealand actress and theatre director, pneumonia.
- Ann Prentiss, 70, American actress (Captain Nice, My Stepmother Is an Alien).
- Art Rust Jr., 82, American sports commentator, Parkinson's disease.
- Hasib Sabbagh, 89, Palestinian businessman.
- Vanda Skuratovich, 84, Belarusian Roman Catholic activist.
- Vadú, 32, Cape Verdean singer, traffic collision.
- Yabby You, 63, Jamaican reggae singer and producer, stroke.
- Notable people killed in the 2010 Haiti earthquake:
  - Georges Anglade, 65, Haitian professor and cabinet minister, co-founder of Université du Québec à Montréal.
  - Hédi Annabi, 65, Tunisian diplomat, Head of MINUSTAH.
  - Zilda Arns, 75, Brazilian pediatrician and humanitarian.
  - Luiz Carlos da Costa, 60, Brazilian diplomat, Deputy Head of MINUSTAH.
  - Anne Marie Coriolan, 53, Haitian feminist and activist.
  - Serge Marcil, 65, Canadian politician, Quebec National Assembly of Quebec (1985–1994), MP for Beauharnois—Salaberry (2000–2004).
  - Magalie Marcelin, 47-48, Haitian feminist, lawyer and actress.
  - Flo McGarrell, 35, Italian-born American artist.
  - Myriam Merlet, 53, Haitian political activist.
  - Joseph Serge Miot, 63, Haitian Roman Catholic archbishop of Port-au-Prince.
  - Nikolay Sukhomlin, 64, Russian scientist and professor.
  - Tran Trieu Quan, 57, Vietnamese-Canadian taekwondo grandmaster.
  - Jimmy O, 35, Haitian hip hop musician.
  - Pierre Vernet, 66, Haitian linguist and lexicographer.

=== 13 ===
- Jack Block, 85, American psychologist, complications of a spinal cord injury.
- Edward Brinton, 86, American marine biologist, after long illness.
- Sir Robin Maxwell-Hyslop, 78, British politician, MP for Tiverton (1960–1992).
- Abdullah Mehdar, Yemeni al-Qaeda terrorist, shot.
- Teddy Pendergrass, 59, American soul singer, complications from colorectal cancer.
- Jay Reatard, 29, American garage punk musician, cocaine toxicity.
- Tommy Sloan, 84, Scottish footballer (Hearts, Motherwell).
- Isamu Tanonaka, 77, Japanese voice actor (GeGeGe no Kitaro), heart attack.
- Ed Thigpen, 79, American jazz drummer, after long illness.
- Edgar Vos, 78, Dutch fashion designer, heart attack.

=== 14 ===
- Ante Babaja, 82, Croatian film director and screenwriter.
- Bobby Charles, 71, American songwriter ("See You Later, Alligator", "(I Don't Know Why) But I Do").
- Antonio Fontán, 86, Spanish politician and journalist.
- Micha Gaillard, 52-53, Haitian politician, earthquake.
- John F. Hayes, 90, American attorney and politician, Kansas House of Representatives (1953–1955; 1967–1979).
- Mark Jones, 70, British actor (The Empire Strikes Back, Doctor Who, Buccaneer).
- Guðmundur Lárusson, 84, Icelandic Olympic sprinter.
- Charles Nolte, 86, American actor, playwright and educator, prostate cancer.
- Otto, 20, British dachshund-terrier, world's oldest dog, euthanised following stomach tumour.
- P. K. Page, 93, Canadian poet.
- Chilton Price, 96, American songwriter ("Slow Poke", "You Belong to Me").
- Phoebe Prince, 15, Irish student at South Hadley High School, Massachusetts, bullying victim, suicide by hanging.
- Marika Rivera, 90, French actress, daughter of Diego Rivera.
- James W. Rutherford, 84, American mayor of Flint, Michigan (1975–1983, 2002–2003).
- Katharina Rutschky, 68, German educationalist and author.
- Petra Schürmann, 74, German television presenter, Miss World 1956, after long illness.
- Jessie Tait, 81, British ceramic designer.
- Antonio Vilaplana Molina, 83, Spanish Roman Catholic Bishop of León (1987–2002), renal failure.
- Bernie Voorheis, 87, American basketball player.
- Rowland Wolfe, 95, American Olympic gold medal-winning (1932) gymnast.

=== 15 ===
- Asim Butt, 31, Pakistani artist (Stuckism art movement), suicide by hanging.
- Florence-Marie Cooper, 69, American federal judge, District Court for Central District of California (since 1999), lymphoma.
- Michael Creeth, 85, British biochemist.
- Bahman Jalali, 65, Iranian photographer, pancreatic cancer.
- Detlev Lauscher, 57, German footballer.
- Steve Lovelady, 66, American Pulitzer Prize-winning journalist, throat cancer.
- Mike Osborn, 92, British military officer.
- Marshall Warren Nirenberg, 82, American biochemist and geneticist, Nobel Prize laureate (1968), cancer.
- Peter Thomson, 73, Australian Anglican theologian, mentor to Tony Blair.

=== 16 ===
- Glen Bell, 86, American entrepreneur, founder of Taco Bell.
- Judi Chamberlin, 65, American anti-psychiatry activist, lung disease.
- Guy Day, 79, American advertising executive.
- Sam Dixon, 60, American minister, Deputy General Secretary of UMCOR (since 2007), earthquake.
- Robert Gerard, 89, Belgian footballer
- Musa Inuwa, 62, Nigerian politician.
- George Jellinek, 90, American radio personality (WQXR).
- Felice Quinto, 80, Italian photographer.
- Takumi Shibano, 83, Japanese novelist, pneumonia.
- Carl Smith, 82, American country singer-songwriter ("Hey Joe"), after long illness.
- Bernie Weintraub, 76, American talent agent, co-founder of the Paradigm Talent Agency.
- Jimmy Wyble, 87, American guitarist, heart failure.

=== 17 ===
- Gaines Adams, 26, American football player (Chicago Bears, Tampa Bay Buccaneers), cardiac arrest.
- Maki Asakawa, 67, Japanese singer, heart failure.
- Jyoti Basu, 95, Indian politician, Chief Minister of West Bengal (1977–2000), complications from pneumonia.
- Thomas F. Cowan, 82, American politician, New Jersey State Senator (1984–1994).
- Daisuke Gōri, 57, Japanese voice actor (Dragon Ball, Kinnikuman, Mobile Suit Gundam), suicide by wrist cutting.
- Béla Köpeczi, 88, Hungarian historian and politician, Minister of Education (1982–1988).
- Michalis Papakonstantinou, 91, Greek politician and author, Minister for Foreign Affairs (1992–1993).
- Erich Segal, 72, American professor, author (Love Story), and screenwriter (Yellow Submarine), heart attack.

=== 18 ===
- Ghulam Rabbani Agro, 76, Pakistani writer.
- K. S. Ashwath, 84, Indian actor, multiple organ failure.
- Cyril Burke, 84, Australian rugby union player.
- Herb Grosch, 91, Canadian-born American computer scientist.
- Kate McGarrigle, 63, Canadian folk singer, clear-cell sarcoma.
- Günter Mielke, 67, German Olympic athlete.
- Gladys Morcom, 91, British Olympic swimmer.
- Imari Obadele, 79, American black separatist, stroke.
- Reha Oğuz Türkkan, 90, Turkish writer.
- Kevin O'Shea, 62, Canadian ice hockey player (St. Louis Blues, Buffalo Sabres).
- Robert B. Parker, 77, American detective writer (Spenser series, Jesse Stone novels), heart attack.
- Jörgen Philip-Sörensen, 71, Danish businessman, after long illness.
- Robert D. Rowley, 68, American Episcopal Bishop of Northwestern Pennsylvania (1991–2007).
- Josephus Tethool, 75, Indonesian Roman Catholic Auxiliary Bishop of Amboina (1982–2009).
- Celestino Tugot, 99, Filipino golfer, winner of the Philippine Open (1949, 1955–1958, 1962), lung cancer.

=== 19 ===
- Mahmoud al-Mabhouh, 50, Palestinian leader of the Izz ad-Din al-Qassam Brigades, murdered.
- Frances Buss Buch, 92, American first female television director.
- Christos Chatziskoulidis, 58, Greek footballer (Egaleo F.C.), cancer.
- Ian Christie, 82, British jazz clarinetist.
- Tom Cochran, 85, American football player (Washington Redskins).
- Dan Fitzgerald, 67, American college basketball coach (Gonzaga).
- Vladimir Karpov, 87, Russian writer, Chairman of the USSR Union of Writers (1986–1991).
- Jennifer Lyon, 37, American reality TV personality (Survivor: Palau), breast cancer.
- Ida Mae Martinez, 78, American professional wrestler.
- Bill McLaren, 86, Scottish rugby union commentator.
- Panajot Pano, 70, Albanian footballer.
- Cerge Remonde, 51, Filipino journalist and politician, heart attack.
- Kalthoum Sarrai, 47, Tunisian-born French television presenter (Supernanny), cancer.
- William Vitarelli, 99, American educator and architect.

=== 20 ===
- Enid Campbell, 77, Australian legal scholar.
- Tony Cummins, 103, Irish Roman Catholic priest.
- Patricia Donoho Hughes, 79, American First Lady of Maryland (1979–1987), wife of Harry Hughes, Parkinson's disease.
- John S. Loisel, 89, American fighter ace.
- Bob Minton, 63, American-born Irish banker, critic of Scientology, heart ailment.
- John Francis Moore, 68, Nigerian Roman Catholic Bishop of Bauchi (since 2003).
- Jack Parry, 86, Welsh footballer (Swansea Town, Ipswich Town, Wales).
- John Pawle, 94, English cricketer.
- Derek Prag, 86, British politician, MEP for Hertfordshire (1979–1994).
- Wallace Michael Ross, 89, British organist and choirmaster.
- Abraham Sutzkever, 96, Polish-born Israeli poet.
- Lynn Taitt, 75, Jamaican reggae guitarist, cancer.

=== 21 ===
- Sayeed Ahmed, 79, Bangladeshi playwright.
- Orhan Alp, 90, Turkish engineer and politician.
- Bobby Bragan, 92, American baseball player and manager, heart attack.
- Irwin Dambrot, 81, American basketball player involved in the CCNY Point Shaving Scandal, Parkinson's disease.
- Lawrence Garfinkel, 88, American epidemiologist, cardiovascular disease.
- Knud Gleie, 74, Danish Olympic swimmer.
- Larry Johnson, 62, American film producer, heart attack.
- Chindodi Leela, 72, Indian theatre and film actress, complications from heart attack.
- Robert "Squirrel" Lester, 67, American smooth soul tenor (The Chi-Lites), liver cancer.
- Hal Manders, 92, American baseball player (Detroit Tigers).
- Jacques Martin, 88, French comics artist and writer.
- Camille Maurane, 98, French baritone singer.
- Guillermo Abadía Morales, 97, Colombian folklore researcher, indigenous language expert, natural causes.
- Curt Motton, 69, American baseball player, stomach cancer.
- Paul Quarrington, 56, Canadian novelist, musician and screenwriter, lung cancer.

=== 22 ===
- Apache, 45, American rapper.
- Lenna Arnold, 89, American baseball player (AAGPBL)
- Donnis Churchwell, 73, American football player.
- Sir Percy Cradock, 86, British diplomat, after short illness.
- Sir Dermot de Trafford, 85, British aristocrat and businessman.
- Clayton Gerein, 45, Canadian wheelchair sports athlete, seven-time Paralympian, brain tumor.
- Claus Gerson, 92, American Olympic hockey player.
- Louis R. Harlan, 87, American Pulitzer Prize-winning historian, after long illness.
- Iskandar of Johor, 77, Malaysian Yang di-Pertuan Agong (1984–1989), Sultan of Johor (1981–2010).
- Jennifer Lyn Jackson, 40, American Playboy model, drug overdose.
- Andrew E. Lange, 52, American astrophysicist, Big Bang researcher, suicide by asphyxiation.
- Juan Pedro Laporte, 64, Guatemalan archaeologist.
- Janeshwar Mishra, 76, Indian politician, cardiac arrest.
- James Mitchell, 89, American actor (All My Children), chronic obstructive pulmonary disease.
- Private Terms, 25, American Thoroughbred racehorse, euthanized.
- Gordon Richardson, Baron Richardson of Duntisbourne, 94, British Governor of the Bank of England (1973–1983).
- Godfrey A. Rockefeller, 85, American aviator and conservationist.
- Johnny Seven, 83, American actor (Ironside, The Apartment, Gunfight in Abilene), lung cancer.
- Jean Simmons, 80, British actress (Hamlet, Spartacus, Guys and Dolls), Emmy winner (1983), lung cancer.
- Ruth P. Smith, 102, American pro-choice campaigner.
- Tuanaitau F. Tuia, 89, American Samoan politician and legislator, longest serving member of the American Samoa Fono.
- Betty Wilson, 88, Australian cricketer.
- Tom Wittum, 60, American football player (San Francisco 49ers), cancer.

=== 23 ===
- George C. Baldwin, 92, American physicist.
- Haren S. Gandhi, 68, Indian-born American inventor and engineer.
- Robert Lam, 64, Malaysian news presenter, skin cancer.
- Douglas J. Martin, 82, New Zealand leader in the LDS Church.
- Sam Match, 87, American tennis player.
- Roger Pierre, 86, French actor (Mon oncle d'Amérique), cancer.
- Sir Thomas Prickett, 96, British RAF Air Chief Marshal.
- Kermit Tyler, 96, American pilot, figured in the attack on Pearl Harbor, complications from strokes.
- Oleg Velyky, 32, Ukrainian-born German handball player, melanoma.
- Earl Wild, 94, American classical pianist, heart failure.

=== 24 ===
- Boydson Baird, 91, American basketball player.
- Lawrence Aloysius Burke, 77, Jamaican Roman Catholic Archbishop of Kingston (2004–2008), Nassau (1981–2004), cancer.
- Thomas Cullinan, 63, South African cricketer.
- Donald Dowd, 87, American campaign aide to the Kennedy family.
- Ghazali Shafie, 87, Malaysian politician, Home Minister (1973–1981) and Foreign Minister (1981–1984).
- Irshad Ahmed Haqqani, 81, Pakistani journalist and politician.
- Robert Mosbacher, 82, American politician, Secretary of Commerce (1989–1992), pancreatic cancer.
- Leonid Nechayev, 70, Russian film director, stroke.
- Jim Podoley, 76, American football player (Washington Redskins), melanoma.
- James Henry Quello, 95, American government official, FCC Commissioner (1974–1997), heart and kidney failure.
- FitzRoy Somerset, 5th Baron Raglan, 82, British aristocrat.
- Pernell Roberts, 81, American actor (Bonanza; Trapper John, M.D., Ride Lonesome), pancreatic cancer.
- Peter Wood, 74, Australian politician, member of the Legislative Assembly of Queensland (1966–1974).

=== 25 ===
- Ali Hassan al-Majid, 68, Iraqi military commander and government minister, execution by hanging.
- Sefis Anastasakos, 68, Greek politician, author, lawyer and activist, cancer.
- Lynn Bayonas, 66, Australian television writer and producer, cancer.
- Orlando Cole, 101, American classical cellist and educator.
- Horace Weldon Gilmore, 91, American federal judge.
- Jane Jarvis, 94, American jazz pianist and organist.
- Pádraig MacKernan, 69, Irish diplomat, Secretary General (Foreign Affairs), Ambassador to France and United States.
- Georgiann Makropoulos, 67, American professional wrestling historian and author, heart attack.
- Iivari Malmikoski, 82, Finnish Olympic boxer.
- Charles Mathias, 87, American politician, Senator from Maryland (1969–1987), complications of Parkinson's disease.
- Gordon Park, 66, British convicted murderer, apparent suicide by hanging.
- Algirdas Petrulis, 95, Lithuanian painter.
- Ivan Prenđa, 70, Croatian Roman Catholic Archbishop of Zadar (since 1990).
- Bill Ritchie, 78, Scottish comic book artist.
- Emilio Vieyra, 88, Argentine film director, actor, screenwriter and producer.

=== 26 ===
- Andon Amaraich, 77, Micronesian Chief Justice of the Supreme Court, pneumonia.
- Louis Auchincloss, 92, American novelist, complications of a stroke.
- Juliusz Bardach, 95, Polish historian.
- Boa Sr, 85, Indian Great Andamanese elder, last speaker of the Bo language.
- Geoffrey Burbidge, 84, British-born American astrophysicist, after long illness.
- Anne Froelick, 96, American blacklisted screenwriter.
- Dag Frøland, 64, Norwegian comedian, singer and variety artist.
- Gummadi, 82, Indian actor.
- Paul R. Jones, 81, American art collector, after short illness.
- Eugenijus Karpavičius, 56, Lithuanian illustrator.
- Inda Ledesma, 83, Argentine actress, cardiac arrest.
- Ajmer Singh, 69, Indian athlete and educator.
- Paul Mbiybe Verdzekov, 79, Cameroonian Roman Catholic Archbishop of Bamenda (1970–2006).
- Ken Walters, 76, American baseball player (Philadelphia Phillies).

=== 27 ===
- Harry Alger, 85, Canadian politician.
- Lee Archer, 90, American Air Force pilot (Tuskegee Airman).
- Barry Blitzer, 80, American television writer (Gomer Pyle, U.S.M.C., The Flintstones, The Jetsons), complications from abdominal surgery.
- Betty Lou Keim, 71, American actress, lung cancer.
- Ruben Kruger, 39, South African rugby union player, brain tumor.
- Eduardo Michaelsen, 89, Cuban exile, painter in the naive art style.
- Shirley Collie Nelson, 78, American country singer, ex-wife of Willie Nelson.
- Zelda Rubinstein, 76, American actress (Poltergeist, Picket Fences, Scariest Places on Earth).
- J. D. Salinger, 91, American author (The Catcher in the Rye).
- Howard Zinn, 87, American historian (A People's History of the United States), civil rights and anti-war activist, heart attack.

=== 28 ===
- A. K. M. Mohiuddin Ahmed, Bangladesh Army officer, hanged.
- Mohammad-Reza Ali-Zamani, app. 38, Iranian activist, hanging.
- Frank Baker Jr., 66, American baseball player (Cleveland Indians), heart failure.
- Larbi Belkheir, 72, Algerian major general, Interior Minister (1991).
- Bill Binder, 94, American restaurateur (Phillippe's).
- Eduardo Catalano, 92, Argentine architect.
- Patricia Clarke, 90, British biochemist.
- José Eugênio Corrêa, 95, Brazilian Roman Catholic Bishop of Caratinga (1957–1978).
- Margaret Dale, 87, British dancer and television director.
- Walter Fondren, 73, American football player and conservationist, heart failure.
- George Hanlon, 92, Australian horse trainer, three-time Melbourne Cup winner, natural causes.
- Mick Higgins, 87, Irish Gaelic footballer, All-Ireland Senior Football Championship winner (Cavan; 1947, 1948, 1952).
- Wilfriede Hoffmann, 77, German Olympic athlete.
- Mohammad Bazlul Huda, Bangladeshi army officer and assassin of Sheikh Mujibur Rahman, hanged.
- Alistair Hulett, 57, Scottish-born Australian folk singer, liver failure.
- Robert Joffe, 66, American lawyer, pancreatic cancer.
- Patricia Leonard, 73, British contralto, throat cancer.
- Kazimierz Mijal, 99, Polish politician.
- Bud Millikan, 89, American basketball coach (University of Maryland).
- Sarah Mulvey, 34, British television producer (Channel 4), suspected suicide by opioid overdose.
- Sayed Farooq-ur-Rahman, 63, Bangladeshi army officer and politician, hanging.
- Arash Rahmanipour, app. 20, Iranian activist, execution by hanging.
- Seymour Sarason, 91, American psychologist.
- Keiko Tobe, 52, Japanese manga artist (With the Light), mesothelioma.

=== 29 ===
- Evgeny Agranovich, 91, Russian composer and bard.
- Elsa Bakalar, 90–91, English-born American garden designer.
- Tom Brookshier, 78, American football player (Philadelphia Eagles), coach and sportscaster (CBS Sports, WCAU), cancer.
- Adam Alexander Dawson, 96, British film editor.
- Eric Freiwald, 82, American television writer (The Young and the Restless).
- Georgelle Hirliman, 73, American performance artist, cancer.
- Sir Derek Hodgkinson, 92, British air chief marshal.
- Tom Howard, 59, American musician, heart attack.
- Ralph McInerny, 80, American philosopher (University of Notre Dame) and mystery author (Father Dowling Mysteries).
- Ram Niwas Mirdha, 85, Indian politician (Lok Sabha), minister and speaker (Rajasthan Legislative Assembly), multiple organ dysfunction syndrome.
- Wilf Paish, 77, British athletics coach, after long illness.
- Mikael Reuterswärd, 45, Swedish adventurer, first Swede to reach summit of Mount Everest (body found on this date).
- Karen Schmeer, 39, American documentary film editor (The Fog of War), vehicular hit-and-run.
- Zahid Sheikh, 60, Pakistani Olympic silver medal-winning (1972) field hockey player.
- Cameron Snyder, 93, American sports journalist (The Baltimore Sun), won Dick McCann Memorial Award (1982), lung cancer.
- Eckart Viehweg, 61, German mathematician, after short illness.

=== 30 ===
- Rafet Angın, 94, Turkish teacher.
- Erna Baumbauer, 91, German casting agent.
- Ruth Cohn, 97, German psychotherapist.
- Lucienne Day, 93, British textile designer.
- Ron Giles, 90, English cricketer (Nottinghamshire).
- Sølve Grotmol, 70, Norwegian sports commentator.
- Bruce Mitchell, 90, Australian academic.
- Ursula Mommens, 101, British potter.
- Brahmananda Panda, 61, Indian politician.
- Guy Renwick, 73, British Olympic bobsledder.
- Aaron Ruben, 95, American television producer (Andy Griffith Show, Gomer Pyle U.S.M.C., Sanford and Son), pneumonia.
- Tan Eng Yoon, 82, Singaporean Olympic sprinter.

=== 31 ===
- Gunnar Aksnes, 83, Norwegian chemist and poet.
- Kage Baker, 57, American science fiction and fantasy author, uterine cancer.
- Pauly Fuemana, 40, New Zealand musician (OMC), after short illness.
- Henry Fukuhara, 96, American watercolor painter, natural causes.
- Patricia Gage, 69, British actress and voice actress.
- Jiří Havlis, 77, Czech Olympic gold medal-winning (1952) rower.
- Albert Huie, 89, Jamaican painter.
- Edith Josie, 88, Canadian columnist, natural causes.
- Viktor Kaisiepo, 61, Netherlands New Guinean-born Dutch activist for West Papuan independence.
- Thorleif Karlsen, 100, Norwegian police inspector, politician and radio host, natural causes.
- Sanna Kiero, 79, Finnish Olympic cross-country skier.
- Howard Lotsof, 66, American researcher, discovered anti-addictive effects of ibogaine, liver cancer.
- Tomás Eloy Martínez, 75, Argentine writer and journalist, brain tumor.
- Shizuka Miura, 47, Japanese ball-jointed doll maker and musician, suicide.
- John Norris, 76, British-born Canadian publisher (Coda), heart condition.
- Keith Norton, 69, Canadian politician, former MPP for Kingston and the Islands (1975–1985), cancer.
- Paddie O'Neil, 83, British actress and singer.
- Phil Smith, 63, Australian football player, cancer.
- Pierre Vaneck, 78, French actor (The Science of Sleep), complications of heart surgery.
