= Lovelady =

Lovelady and Love Lady may refer to:

== People ==
- Lovelady Powell (1930 – 2020), American actress and singer
- Edward Lovelady (1898 – after 1925), English professional footballer
- Greg Lovelady (born 1979), American college baseball coach
- John Lovelady, American puppeteer
- Josh Lovelady (born 1978), former American football guard
- Richard Lovelady (born 1995), American baseball player
- Steve Lovelady (1943 – 2010), American journalist
- Victor Lynn Lovelady, American killed in Algeria in the 2013 In Aménas hostage crisis
- Victoria Lovelady, (born 1986), Brazilian professional golfer
- William Lovelady, English guitarist

== Places in the United States ==
- Love Lady, Tennessee
- Lovelady, Texas
- Lovelady Independent School District, Lovelady, Texas
- Loveladies, New Jersey

== Other uses ==
- "Love Lady" (Damage song), 1997
