= Bakalar =

Bakalar is a surname. Notable people with the surname include:

- A. M. Bakalar, Polish writer
- David Bakalar, physicist, semiconductor engineer, businessman, and sculptor
- Elsa Bakalar (1919–2010), English-born American garden designer
- Jeff Bakalar (born 1982), American podcaster

== See also ==
- Bakalar Air Force Base, a former United States Air Force base in Indiana
