= September 25 =

September 25 this year in various calendars
- Friday, 25 September 2026
Akan	Monofie
Armenian	7 Sahmi 1476
Aztec	Tititl 18, 12 Miquiztli
Babylonian	12 Ululu, 2337 SE
Balinese pawukon	Menga, Kajeng, Menala, Keliwon, Maulu, Sukra of Bala, Yama, Dadi, Sri
Bengali	10 Ashshin, BS 1433
Chinese	Yang Water Tiger・Ox Mansion; Fire Horse Year, Month 8, Day 15 (Qiufen, 13 days until Hanlu)
Common Era	25 September 2026 CE
Coptic	15 Thout, AM 1743
Egyptian	12 Mechir, 2775 NE
Ethiopian	15 Maskaram, 2019 Amätä Məhrät
French Republican	Décade I, Tridi de Vendémiaire de l'Année 235 de la République
Gregorian	25 September, AD 2026
Hebrew	14 Tishrei, AM 5787
Hindu	Śatabhiṣaj・Śūla; Solar: 9 Āśvina, 1948 SE; Lunisolar: Caturdaśī, Śukla pakṣa of Bhādrapada, 2083 VE; Rāudra・5127 KY・1,872,843
Icelandic	Föstudagur, 2 Haustmánuður 2026
Islamic	12 Rabi' al-thani, AH 1448 (using tabular method)
ISO week date	2026-W39-5
Japanese	15 Hazuki, Reiwa 8 (Shūbun, 13 days until Kanro)
Julian	12 September, AD 2026 (AM 7534)
Julian day	2461309
Korean	15 Dakdal, 4359 DE
Maya	13.0.13.17.6; 19 Chen, 12 Cimi
Roman	Pridie Idus Septembres, MMDCCLXXIX AUC
Solar Hijri	3 Mehr, SH 1405
Tibetan	14 khrums, me pho rta 2153 or 1772 or 1000

<<	September					>>
Su	Mo	Tu	We	Th	Fr	Sa
		1	2	3	4	5
6	7	8	9	10	11	12
13	14	15	16	17	18	19
20	21	22	23	24	25	26
27	28	29	30
2026

September 25 in recent years
2026 (Friday)
2025 (Thursday)
2024 (Wednesday)
2023 (Monday)
2022 (Sunday)
2021 (Saturday)
2020 (Friday)
2019 (Wednesday)
2018 (Tuesday)
2017 (Monday)

September 25 is the 268th day of the year (269th in leap years) in the Gregorian calendar; 97 days remain until the end of the year.

== Events ==
=== Pre-1600 ===
- 275 – For the last time, the Roman Senate chooses an emperor; Marcus Claudius Tacitus is elected.
- 762 – Led by Muhammad al-Nafs al-Zakiyya, the Hasanid branch of the Alids begins the Alid Revolt against the Abbasid Caliphate.
- 867 – Basil I is crowned Byzantine emperor in the Hagia Sophia after he murdered the previous emperor Michael III in the night before.
- 1066 – In the Battle of Stamford Bridge, Harald Hardrada, the invading King of Norway, is defeated by King Harold II of England.
- 1237 – England and Scotland sign the Treaty of York, establishing the location of their common border.
- 1396 – Ottoman Sultan Bayezid I defeats a Christian army at the Battle of Nicopolis.
- 1513 – Spanish explorer Vasco Núñez de Balboa reaches what would become known as the Pacific Ocean.
- 1555 – The Peace of Augsburg is signed by Emperor Charles V and the princes of the Schmalkaldic League.

=== 1601–1900 ===
- 1643 – The House of Commons of England accepts the Solemn League and Covenant, which promises religious reforms in England and Ireland in exchange for support of Scottish troops against king Charles I in the First English Civil War.
- 1690 – Publick Occurrences Both Forreign and Domestick, the first newspaper to appear in the Americas, is published for the first and only time.
- 1768 – Unification of Nepal
- 1775 – American Revolutionary War: Ethan Allen surrenders to British forces after attempting to capture Montreal in the Battle of Longue-Pointe during the invasion of Quebec.
- 1775 – American Revolutionary War: Benedict Arnold's expedition to Quebec sets off to join the American invasion.
- 1786 – The mine of Huancavelica in the Peruvian Andes collapses, killing more than two hundred people. The event was a major setback for mercury production in the Spanish Empire.
- 1789 – The United States Congress passes twelve constitutional amendments: the ten known as the Bill of Rights, the (unratified) Congressional Apportionment Amendment, and the Congressional Compensation Amendment.
- 1790 – Four Great Anhui Troupes introduce Anhui opera to Beijing in honor of the Qianlong Emperor's eightieth birthday.
- 1804 – The Teton Sioux (a subdivision of the Lakota) demand one of the boats from the Lewis and Clark Expedition as a toll for allowing the expedition to move further upriver.
- 1868 – The Imperial Russian steam frigate Alexander Nevsky is shipwrecked off Jutland while carrying Grand Duke Alexei Alexandrovich of Russia.
- 1890 – The United States Congress establishes Sequoia National Park.

=== 1901–present ===
- 1906 – Leonardo Torres Quevedo demonstrates the Telekino in the Bilbao Abra (Spain), guiding an electric boat from the shore with people on board, which was controlled at a distance over 2 km (1.2 mi), in what is considered to be the origin of modern wireless remote-control operation principles.
- 1911 – An explosion of badly degraded propellant charges on board the French battleship Liberté detonates the forward ammunition magazines and destroys the ship.
- 1912 – Columbia University Graduate School of Journalism is founded in New York City.
- 1915 – World War I: The Second Battle of Champagne begins.
- 1918 – World War I: The end of the Battle of Megiddo, the climax of the British Army's Sinai and Palestine campaign under General Edmund Allenby.
- 1926 – The international Convention to Suppress the Slave Trade and Slavery is first signed.
- 1937 – Second Sino-Japanese War: The Chinese Eighth Route Army gains a minor, but morale-boosting victory in the Battle of Pingxingguan.
- 1944 – World War II: Surviving elements of the British 1st Airborne Division withdraw from Arnhem via Oosterbeek.
- 1955 – The Royal Jordanian Air Force is founded.
- 1956 – TAT-1, the first submarine transatlantic telephone cable system, is inaugurated.
- 1957 – Central High School in Little Rock, Arkansas, is integrated by the use of United States Army troops.
- 1959 – S. W. R. D. Bandaranaike, Prime Minister of Ceylon, is mortally shot by a Buddhist monk, Talduwe Somarama, and dies the next day.
- 1962 – The People's Democratic Republic of Algeria is formally proclaimed. Ferhat Abbas is elected President of the provisional government.
- 1962 – The North Yemen Civil War begins when Abdullah al-Sallal dethrones the newly crowned Imam al-Badr and declares Yemen a republic under his presidency.
- 1963 – Lord Denning releases the UK government's official report on the Profumo affair.
- 1964 – The Mozambican War of Independence against Portugal begins.
- 1969 – The charter establishing the Organisation of Islamic Cooperation is signed.
- 1974 – Dr. Frank Jobe performs first ulnar collateral ligament replacement surgery (better known as Tommy John surgery) on baseball player Tommy John.
- 1977 – About 4,200 people take part in the first running of the Chicago Marathon.
- 1978 – PSA Flight 182, a Boeing 727, collides in mid-air with a Cessna 172 and crashes in San Diego, killing all 135 aboard Flight 182, both occupants of the Cessna, as well as seven people on the ground.
- 1981 – Belize joins the United Nations.
- 1983 – Thirty-eight IRA prisoners, armed with six handguns, hijack a prison meals lorry and smash their way out of the Maze Prison.
- 1985 – Three civilians killed by alleged supporters of the Palestine Liberation Organization in Larnaca yacht killings.
- 1987 – Fijian Governor-General Penaia Ganilau is overthrown in a coup d'état led by Lieutenant colonel Sitiveni Rabuka.
- 1992 – NASA launches the Mars Observer. Eleven months later, the probe would fail while preparing for orbital insertion.
- 1997 – NASA launches Space Shuttle Atlantis on STS-86 to the Mir space station.
- 1998 – PauknAir Flight 4101, a British Aerospace 146, crashes near Melilla Airport in Melilla, Spain, killing 38 people.
- 2003 – The 8.3 M_{w} Hokkaidō earthquake strikes just offshore Hokkaidō, Japan.
- 2018 – Bill Cosby is sentenced to three to ten years in prison for aggravated sexual assault.

== Births ==
=== Pre-1600 ===
- 1358 – Ashikaga Yoshimitsu, Japanese shōgun (died 1408)
- 1403 – Louis III of Anjou (died 1434)
- 1525 – Steven Borough, English explorer and navigator (died 1584)
- 1528 – Otto II, Duke of Brunswick-Harburg (died 1603)
- 1529 – Günther XLI, Count of Schwarzburg-Arnstadt (died 1583)
- 1599 – Francesco Borromini, Swiss-Italian architect, designed the San Carlo alle Quattro Fontane and Sant'Agnese in Agone (died 1667)

=== 1601–1900 ===
- 1636 – Ferdinand Joseph, Prince of Dietrichstein, German prince (died 1698)
- 1644 – Ole Rømer, Danish astronomer and instrument maker (died 1710)
- 1663 – Johann Nikolaus Hanff, German organist and composer (died 1711)
- 1683 – Jean-Philippe Rameau, French composer and theorist (died 1764)
- 1694 – Henry Pelham, English politician, Prime Minister of the United Kingdom (died 1754)
- 1711 – Qianlong Emperor of China (died 1799)
- 1738 – Nicholas Van Dyke, American lawyer and politician, 7th Governor of Delaware (died 1789)
- 1741 – Wenzel Pichl, Czech violinist, composer, and director (died 1805)
- 1744 – Frederick William II of Prussia (died 1797)
- 1758 – Josepha Barbara Auernhammer, Austrian pianist and composer (died 1820)
- 1761 – William Mullins, 2nd Baron Ventry, Anglo-Irish politician and peer (died 1827)
- 1764 – Fletcher Christian, English sailor (died 1793)
- 1766 – Armand-Emmanuel de Vignerot du Plessis, Duc de Richelieu, French general and politician, 2nd Prime Minister of France (died 1822)
- 1771 – Nikolay Raevsky, Russian general and politician (died 1829)
- 1773 – Agostino Bassi, Italian entomologist and author (died 1856)
- 1782 – Charles Maturin, Irish author and playwright (died 1824)
- 1798 – Jean-Baptiste Élie de Beaumont, French geologist and engineer (died 1874)
- 1807 – Alfred Vail, American inventor and early telegraph pioneer (died 1859)
- 1816 – Georg August Rudolph, German lawyer and politician, 3rd Mayor of Marburg (died 1893)
- 1825 – William Pitt Ballinger, American lawyer and politician (died 1888)
- 1825 – Joachim Heer, Swiss lawyer and politician, President of the National Council (died 1879)
- 1839 – Karl Alfred von Zittel, German palaeontologist and geologist (died 1904)
- 1862 – Léon Boëllmann, French organist and composer (died 1897)
- 1862 – Billy Hughes, English-Australian carpenter and politician, 7th Prime Minister of Australia (died 1952)
- 1865 – Henri Lebasque, French artist (died 1937)
- 1866 – Thomas Hunt Morgan, American biologist, geneticist, and embryologist, Nobel Prize laureate (died 1945)
- 1867 – Yevgeny Miller, Russian general (died 1938)
- 1877 – Plutarco Elías Calles, Mexican general and President (died 1945)
- 1879 – Lope K. Santos, Filipino lawyer and politician, 4th Governor of Rizal (died 1963)
- 1881 – Lu Xun, Chinese author and critic (died 1936)
- 1884 – Adolf Bolm, Russian ballet dancer and choreographer (died 1951)
- 1888 – Hanna Ralph, German actress (died 1978)
- 1889 – Charles Kenneth Scott Moncrieff, Scottish author and translator (died 1930)
- 1893 – Harald Cramér, Swedish mathematician and statistician (died 1985)
- 1896 – Sandro Pertini, Italian journalist and politician, 7th President of Italy (died 1990)
- 1897 – William Faulkner, American novelist and short story writer, Nobel Prize laureate (died 1962)
- 1898 – Robert Brackman, Ukrainian-American painter and educator (died 1980)
- 1899 – Udumalai Narayana Kavi, Indian poet and songwriter (died 1981)
- 1900 – Artur Sirk, Estonian soldier, lawyer, and politician (died 1937)

=== 1901–present ===
- 1901 – Robert Bresson, French director and screenwriter (died 1999)
- 1901 – Gordon Coventry, Australian footballer (died 1968)
- 1903 – Mark Rothko, Latvian-American painter and educator (died 1970)
- 1905 – Nahman Avigad, Israeli archaeologist (Discovering Jerusalem) (died 1992)
- 1906 – Volfgangs Dārziņš, Latvian composer, pianist, and music critic (died 1962)
- 1906 – Phyllis Pearsall, English painter, cartographer, and author (died 1996)
- 1906 – Dmitri Shostakovich, Russian pianist and composer (died 1975)
- 1908 – Jacqueline Audry, French director and screenwriter (died 1977)
- 1910 – Ralph Jordan, American football player and coach (died 1980)
- 1911 – Eric Williams, Trinidadian historian and politician, 1st Prime Minister of Trinidad and Tobago (died 1981)
- 1914 – John Manners, English naval officer and cricketer (died 2020)
- 1916 – Jessica Anderson, Australian author and playwright (died 2010)
- 1916 – Deendayal Upadhyaya, Indian economist, sociologist, and journalist (died 1968)
- 1917 – Phil Rizzuto, American baseball player and sportscaster (died 2007)
- 1920 – Sergei Bondarchuk, Ukrainian-Russian actor, director, and screenwriter (died 1994)
- 1920 – Satish Dhawan, Indian engineer (died 2002)
- 1921 – Rob Muldoon, New Zealand sergeant, accountant, and politician, 31st Prime Minister of New Zealand (died 1992)
- 1922 – Hammer DeRoburt, Nauruian educator and politician, 1st President of Nauru (died 1992)
- 1923 – Robert Laxalt, American author and academic (died 2001)
- 1923 – Sam Rivers, American saxophonist, clarinet player, and composer (died 2011)
- 1924 – Norman Ayrton, English actor and director (died 2017)
- 1924 – Red Webb, American baseball player (died 1996)
- 1925 – Silvana Pampanini, Italian model, actress, and director, Miss Italy 1946 (died 2016)
- 1926 – Jack Hyles, American pastor and author (died 2001)
- 1926 – Aldo Ray, American actor (died 1991)
- 1927 – Carl Braun, American basketball player and coach (died 2010)
- 1927 – Colin Davis, English conductor and educator (died 2013)
- 1929 – Ronnie Barker, English actor and screenwriter (died 2005)
- 1929 – Delia Scala, Italian ballerina and actress (died 2004)
- 1929 – Barbara Walters, American journalist, producer, and author (died 2022)
- 1930 – Nino Cerruti, Italian fashion designer, founded Cerruti (died 2022)
- 1930 – Francine du Plessix Gray, French-American journalist and author (died 2019)
- 1930 – Shel Silverstein, American author, poet, illustrator, and songwriter (died 1999)
- 1931 – Manouchehr Atashi, Iranian journalist and poet (died 2005)
- 1931 – Bryan John Birch, English mathematician and scholar
- 1932 – Glenn Gould, Canadian pianist and composer (died 1982)
- 1932 – Terry Medwin, Welsh footballer and manager (died 2024)
- 1932 – Adolfo Suárez, Spanish lawyer and politician, 1st Prime Minister of Spain (died 2014)
- 1933 – Hubie Brown, American basketball player, coach, and sportscaster
- 1933 – Ian Tyson, Canadian folk singer-songwriter and musician (died 2022)
- 1934 – Struther Arnott, Scottish molecular biologist and chemist (cancer research) (died 2013)
- 1936 – Ken Forsse, American toy creator and author, created Teddy Ruxpin (died 2014)
- 1936 – Juliet Prowse, South African-American actress, singer, and dancer (died 1996)
- 1936 – Moussa Traoré, Malian general and politician 2nd President of Mali (died 2020)
- 1937 – Mary Allen Wilkes, American computer scientist and lawyer
- 1938 – Ron Hill, English runner and businessman (died 2021)
- 1938 – Jonathan Motzfeldt, Greenlandic priest and politician, 1st Prime Minister of Greenland (died 2010)
- 1938 – Enn Tarto, Estonian politician (died 2021)
- 1939 – Leon Brittan, English lawyer and politician, Secretary of State for Business, Innovation and Skills (died 2015)
- 1939 – Feroz Khan, Indian actor, director, and producer (died 2009)
- 1939 – David S. Mann, American lawyer and politician, Mayor of Cincinnati
- 1940 – Tim Severin, Indian-English explorer, historian, and author (died 2020)
- 1941 – Vivien Stern, Baroness Stern, English academic and politician
- 1942 – Oscar Bonavena, Argentinian boxer (died 1976)
- 1942 – Robert Miano, American actor and producer
- 1942 – Henri Pescarolo, French race car driver
- 1942 – John Taylor, English pianist and educator (died 2015)
- 1942 – Dee Dee Warwick, American singer (died 2008)
- 1943 – Robert Gates, American lieutenant, academic, and politician, 22nd United States Secretary of Defense
- 1943 – John Locke, American keyboard player (died 2006)
- 1943 – Aram Saroyan, American poet and novelist
- 1943 – Robert Walden, American actor, director, and screenwriter
- 1944 – Michael Douglas, American actor and producer
- 1944 – Doris Matsui, American politician
- 1944 – Grayson Shillingford, Dominican cricketer (died 2009)
- 1945 – Kathleen Brown, American lawyer and politician, 29th California State Treasurer
- 1945 – Carol Vadnais, Canadian ice hockey player and coach (died 2014)
- 1946 – Bishan Singh Bedi, Indian cricketer and coach (died 2023)
- 1946 – Felicity Kendal, English actress
- 1946 – Bryan MacLean, American singer-songwriter, guitarist, and producer (died 1998)
- 1946 – Janusz Majer, Polish mountaineer
- 1946 – Gil Morgan, American golfer
- 1946 – Ali Parvin, Iranian footballer
- 1946 – Jerry Penrod, American bass player
- 1947 – Giannos Kranidiotis, Greek politician and diplomat (died 1999)
- 1947 – Cheryl Tiegs, American model and actress
- 1947 – Cecil Womack, American singer-songwriter and producer (died 2013)
- 1948 – Mimi Kennedy, American actress and screenwriter
- 1948 – Kathi McDonald, American blues and rock singer (background vocals for Long John Baldry and others) (died 2012)
- 1948 – Vasile Șirli, Romanian musical composer and producer
- 1948 – Vladimir Yevtushenkov, Russian businessman
- 1949 – Pedro Almodóvar, Spanish director, producer, and screenwriter
- 1949 – Jeff Borowiak, American tennis player
- 1949 – Steve Mackay, American saxophonist and composer (died 2015)
- 1949 – Anson Williams, American actor, singer, and director
- 1950 – E. C. Coleman, American basketball player
- 1950 – Stanisław Szozda, Polish cyclist and trainer (died 2013)
- 1951 – Yardena Arazi, Israeli singer
- 1951 – Burleigh Drummond, American drummer and songwriter
- 1951 – Graeme Knowles, English bishop
- 1951 – Mark Hamill, American actor, singer, and producer
- 1951 – Bob McAdoo, American basketball player and coach
- 1952 – Colin Friels, Scottish-Australian actor
- 1952 – Jimmy Garvin, American wrestler and manager
- 1952 – Bell Hooks, American author and activist (died 2021)
- 1952 – Cherríe Moraga, American poet, playwright, and activist
- 1952 – Tommy Norden, American actor
- 1952 – Chris Pond, English politician
- 1952 – Christopher Reeve, American actor, producer, and activist (died 2004)
- 1953 – Richard Harvey, English mandolin player, keyboard player, and composer
- 1953 – Ron Rash, American novelist, short story writer, poet
- 1954 – Sylvester Croom, American football player and coach
- 1954 – Joep Lange, Dutch physician and academic (died 2014)
- 1954 – Juande Ramos, Spanish footballer and manager
- 1955 – Ludo Coeck, Belgian footballer (died 1985)
- 1955 – Zucchero Fornaciari, Italian singer-songwriter and guitarist
- 1955 – Amyr Klink, Brazilian sailor and explorer
- 1955 – Luanne Rice, American author and activist
- 1955 – Karl-Heinz Rummenigge, German footballer and manager
- 1955 – Steven Severin, English bass player, songwriter, and producer
- 1956 – W. Daniel Hillis, American computer scientist, engineer, and author, founded the Thinking Machines Corporation
- 1956 – Jamie Hyneman, American special effects designer and television host, founded M5 Industries
- 1956 – Miroslav Volf, Croatian Protestant theologian and public intellectual
- 1957 – Michael Madsen, American actor and producer (died 2025)
- 1957 – Vladimir Popovkin, Russian general (died 2014)
- 1957 – Glenn Hubbard, American baseball player and coach
- 1958 – Randy Kerber, American keyboard player, composer, and conductor
- 1959 – Jeon Soo-il, South Korean director, producer, and screenwriter
- 1960 – Igor Belanov, Ukrainian footballer and manager
- 1961 – Mehmet Aslantuğ, Turkish actor, director, producer, and screenwriter
- 1961 – Heather Locklear, American actress
- 1961 – Steve Scott, British journalist and presenter
- 1961 – Tim Zoehrer, Australian cricketer
- 1962 – Kalthoum Sarrai, Tunisian-French psychologist and journalist (died 2010)
- 1962 – Aida Turturro, American actress
- 1962 – Dariusz Wdowczyk, Polish footballer and coach
- 1963 – Tate Donovan, American actor
- 1963 – Keely Shaye Smith, American journalist and author
- 1964 – Gary Ayles, English race car driver
- 1964 – Barbara Dennerlein, German organist
- 1964 – Maria Doyle Kennedy, Irish actress and singer
- 1964 – Rebecca Gablé, German novelist
- 1964 – Kikuko Inoue, Japanese singer-songwriter and voice actress
- 1964 – Joey Saputo, Canadian businessman
- 1965 – Matt Battaglia, American football player, actor, and producer
- 1965 – Saffron Henderson, Canadian voice actress and singer
- 1965 – Scottie Pippen, American basketball player and sportscaster
- 1965 – Anne Roumanoff, French actress and screenwriter
- 1965 – Dave Rundle, South African cricketer
- 1965 – Rob Schmidt, American director and screenwriter
- 1965 – Rafael Martín Vázquez, Spanish footballer and coach
- 1965 – Nicky Winmar, Australian footballer
- 1966 – Stanislav Bunin, Russian pianist and educator
- 1966 – Jason Flemyng, English actor
- 1966 – Todd Philcox, American football player
- 1967 – Kim Issel, Canadian ice hockey player
- 1967 – Ashwin Sood, English-Canadian drummer and producer
- 1968 – John A. List, American economist and academic
- 1968 – Will Smith, American actor, producer, and rapper
- 1968 – John Worsfold, Australian footballer and coach
- 1969 – Hansie Cronje, South African cricketer (died 2002)
- 1969 – Bill Simmons, American journalist and author
- 1969 – Hal Sparks, American actor, comedian, musician and political commentator
- 1969 – Tony Womack, American baseball player
- 1969 – David Weathers, American baseball player
- 1969 – Catherine Zeta-Jones, Welsh actress
- 1970 – Curtis Buckley, American football player and psychiatrist
- 1970 – Aja Kong, Japanese professional wrestler
- 1970 – Paul Pope, American cartoonist, writer and artist
- 1970 – Dean Ween, American musician
- 1971 – Nikos Boudouris, Greek basketball player and manager
- 1971 – John Lynch, American football player and sportscaster
- 1971 – Seb Sanders, English jockey
- 1972 – Douglas September, Canadian singer-songwriter, guitarist, and producer
- 1973 – Tijani Babangida, Nigerian footballer
- 1973 – Jenny Chapman, English politician
- 1973 – Bridgette Wilson, American actress, singer, model, and beauty queen
- 1974 – Bill Bowler, Canadian ice hockey player and coach
- 1974 – Olivier Dacourt, French footballer
- 1974 – John Granville, American scholar and diplomat (died 2008)
- 1974 – Paul Hurst, English footballer and manager
- 1974 – Daniel Kessler, English-American singer and guitarist
- 1974 – Frank Leder, German fashion designer
- 1974 – Robbie Mears, Australian rugby league player and coach
- 1974 – Eric Moss, American football player (died 2019)
- 1974 – Joel Prpic, Canadian ice hockey player
- 1974 – Javier Rosas, Mexican triathlete
- 1974 – Kemel Thompson, Jamaican hurdler
- 1975 – Daniela Ceccarelli, Italian skier
- 1975 – Declan Donnelly, English entertainer
- 1975 – Matt Hasselbeck, American football player
- 1975 – Dat Nguyen, American football player and coach
- 1976 – Santigold, American singer-songwriter and producer
- 1976 – Chauncey Billups, American basketball player
- 1976 – Charlotte Ayanna, Puerto Rican-American actress
- 1977 – Clea DuVall, American actress
- 1977 – Robbie Jones, American actor
- 1977 – Mike Krahulik, American illustrator
- 1977 – Toni Lydman, Finnish ice hockey player
- 1977 – Joel David Moore, American actor
- 1977 – Wil Nieves, Puerto Rican-American baseball player
- 1978 – Joe Cotton, Canadian-New Zealand singer
- 1978 – Roudolphe Douala, Cameroonian footballer
- 1978 – Ricardo Gardner, Jamaican footballer
- 1978 – Jodie Kidd, English model and actress
- 1978 – Ryan Leslie, American singer-songwriter and producer
- 1978 – Joel Piñeiro, Puerto Rican baseball player
- 1979 – Kyle Bennett, American BMX rider (died 2012)
- 1979 – Rashad Evans, American mixed martial artist and wrestler
- 1979 – Jason Koumas, Welsh footballer
- 1980 – Chris Owen, American actor
- 1980 – T.I., American rapper, songwriter, producer, and actor
- 1981 – Rocco Baldelli, American baseball player and manager
- 1981 – Jason Bergmann, American baseball player
- 1981 – Lee Norris, American actor
- 1982 – Hyun Bin, South Korean actor
- 1983 – Donald Glover (also known as Childish Gambino), American actor, rapper, producer, and screenwriter
- 1984 – Cherine Anderson, Jamaican singer-songwriter and actress
- 1984 – Matt Carle, American ice hockey player
- 1984 – Ivory Latta, American basketball player
- 1984 – Matías Silvestre, Argentinian footballer
- 1984 – Zach Woods, American actor and comedian
- 1986 – Heidi El Tabakh, Egyptian-Canadian tennis player
- 1986 – Jamie O'Hara, English footballer
- 1986 – Choi Yoon-young, South Korean actress
- 1987 – Monica Niculescu, Romanian tennis player
- 1989 – Jordan Gavaris, Canadian actor
- 1989 – Cuco Martina, Curaçaoan footballer
- 1989 – Aldon Smith, American football player
- 1990 – Mao Asada, Japanese figure skater
- 1991 – Calle Järnkrok, Swedish ice hockey player
- 1992 – Zoël Amberg, Swiss race car driver
- 1992 – Massimo Luongo, Australian footballer
- 1992 – Keauna McLaughlin, American figure skater
- 1992 – Rosalía, Spanish singer-songwriter
- 1992 – Ruslan Zhiganshin, Russian ice dancer
- 1992 – Teddy Swims, American singer and songwriter
- 1993 – Brandin Cooks, American football player
- 1993 – Toby Greene, Australian footballer
- 1995 – Todd Hazelwood, Australian race car driver
- 1997 – Antonia Gentry, American actress
- 2000 – Lilas Ikuta, Japanese singer and songwriter
- 2001 – Cade Cunningham, American basketball player
- 2003 – Bella Ramsey, English actor
- 2009 – Leah Jeffries, American actress

== Deaths ==
=== Pre-1600 ===
- 1066 – Harald Hardrada, Norwegian king (born 1015)
- 1066 – Maria Haraldsdotter, Norwegian princess
- 1066 – Tostig Godwinson, English son of Godwin, Earl of Wessex (born c. 1029)
- 1086 – William VIII, Duke of Aquitaine (born 1025)
- 1087 – Simon I de Montfort, French nobleman (born c. 1025)
- 1333 – Prince Morikuni, Japanese shōgun (born 1301)
- 1367 – Jakushitsu Genkō, Japanese poet (born 1290)
- 1396 – Jean de Carrouges, French knight (born 1330)
- 1396 – Jean de Vienne, French general and admiral (born 1341)
- 1496 – Piero Capponi, Italian soldier and politician (born 1447)
- 1506 – Philip I of Castile (born 1478)
- 1534 – Pope Clement VII (born 1478)
- 1536 – Johannes Secundus, Dutch author and poet (born 1511)
- 1550 – Georg von Blumenthal, German bishop (born 1490)
- 1588 – Tilemann Heshusius, German Gnesio-Lutheran theologian (born 1527)

=== 1601–1900 ===
- 1602 – Caspar Peucer, German physician, scholar, and reformer (born 1525)
- 1615 – Arbella Stuart, English noblewoman and woman of letters (born 1575)
- 1617 – Emperor Go-Yōzei of Japan (born 1572)
- 1617 – Francisco Suárez, Spanish priest, philosopher, and theologian (born 1548)
- 1621 – Mary Sidney, English writer (born 1561)
- 1626 – Lancelot Andrewes, English bishop and scholar (born 1555)
- 1630 – Ambrogio Spinola, 1st Marquis of the Balbases, Italian general and politician, Governor of the Duchy of Milan (born 1569)
- 1665 – Archduchess Maria Anna of Austria (born 1610)
- 1703 – Archibald Campbell, 1st Duke of Argyll, Scottish general (born 1658)
- 1774 – John Bradstreet, Canadian-English general (born 1714)
- 1777 – Johann Heinrich Lambert, Swiss mathematician, physicist, and astronomer (born 1728)
- 1791 – William Bradford, American soldier and publisher (born 1719)
- 1792 – Adam Gottlob Moltke, Danish politician and diplomat (born 1710)
- 1794 – Paul Rabaut, French pastor (born 1718)
- 1828 – Charlotta Seuerling, Swedish singer, harpsichord player, and composer (born 1783)
- 1849 – Johann Strauss I, Austrian composer (born 1804)
- 1867 – Oliver Loving, American rancher, co-developed the Goodnight–Loving Trail (born 1812)
- 1893 – Louise von François, German author (born 1817)
- 1900 – Félix-Gabriel Marchand, Canadian journalist and politician, 11th Premier of Québec (born 1832)
- 1900 – John M. Palmer, American general and politician, 15th Governor of Illinois (born 1817)

=== 1901–present ===
- 1901 – Arthur Fremantle, English general and politician, Governor of Malta (born 1835)
- 1905 – Jacques Marie Eugène Godefroy Cavaignac, French educator and politician (born 1853)
- 1917 – Thomas Ashe, Irish revolutionary, rebel commander, died on hunger strike (born 1885)
- 1918 – Mikhail Alekseyev, Russian general (born 1857)
- 1926 – Herbert Booth, English songwriter and bandleader (born 1862)
- 1928 – Richard F. Outcault, American cartoonist, created The Yellow Kid and Buster Brown (born 1863)
- 1929 – Miller Huggins, American baseball player and manager (born 1879)
- 1933 – Ring Lardner, American journalist and author (born 1885)
- 1938 – Lev Zadov, Ukrainian intelligence agent (born 1893)
- 1939 – Ali Saip Ursavaş, Turkish soldier and politician (born 1885)
- 1941 – Foxhall P. Keene, American polo player, golfer, and race car driver (born 1867)
- 1943 – Alexander Hall, Scottish-Canadian soccer player (born 1880)
- 1946 – Hans Eppinger, Austrian physician (born 1879)
- 1955 – Martha Norelius Swedish-born American swimmer (born 1909)
- 1958 – John B. Watson, American psychologist and academic (born 1878)
- 1960 – Emily Post, American author and educator (born 1873)
- 1961 – Frank Fay, American actor and singer (born 1897)
- 1968 – Hans F. K. Günther, German eugenicist and academic (born 1891)
- 1968 – Cornell Woolrich, American author and screenwriter (born 1903)
- 1970 – Erich Maria Remarque, German-Swiss author and translator (born 1898)
- 1971 – Hugo Black, American captain, jurist, and politician, Associate Supreme Court Justice (born 1886)
- 1972 – Alejandra Pizarnik, Argentine poet (born 1936)
- 1980 – John Bonham, English drummer and songwriter (born 1948)
- 1980 – Lewis Milestone, Russian-American director, producer, and screenwriter (born 1895)
- 1980 – Marie Under, Estonian author and poet (born 1883)
- 1983 – Leopold III of Belgium (born 1901)
- 1984 – Walter Pidgeon, Canadian-American actor (born 1897)
- 1986 – Darshan Singh Canadian, Indian-Canadian trade union leader and activist (born 1917)
- 1986 – Donald MacDonald, Canadian union leader and politician (born 1909)
- 1986 – Nikolay Semyonov, Russian physicist and chemist, Nobel Prize laureate (born 1896)
- 1986 – Hans Vogt, Norwegian linguist and academic (born 1909)
- 1987 – Mary Astor, American actress (born 1906)
- 1987 – Emlyn Williams, Welsh actor and playwright (born 1905)
- 1988 – Billy Carter, American farmer and businessman (born 1937)
- 1988 – Arthur Võõbus, Estonian-American orientalist and scholar (born 1909)
- 1990 – Prafulla Chandra Sen, Indian accountant and politician, 3rd Chief Minister of West Bengal (born 1897)
- 1991 – Klaus Barbie, German SS captain, known as the "Butcher of Lyon" (born 1913)
- 1991 – Viviane Romance, French actress and producer (born 1912)
- 1992 – Ivan Vdović, Serbian musician (born 1961)
- 1995 – Dave Bowen, Welsh footballer and manager (born 1928)
- 1995 – Annie Elizabeth Delany, American dentist and author (born 1891)
- 1997 – Hélène Baillargeon, Canadian singer and actress (born 1916)
- 1997 – Jean Françaix, French pianist, composer, and conductor (born 1912)
- 1999 – Marion Zimmer Bradley, American author (born 1930)
- 2003 – Aqila al-Hashimi, Iraqi translator and politician (born 1953)
- 2003 – Herb Gardner, American director, producer, and screenwriter (born 1934)
- 2003 – Franco Modigliani, Italian-American economist and academic, Nobel Prize laureate (born 1918)
- 2003 – George Plimpton, American writer and literary editor (born 1927)
- 2005 – Don Adams, American actor, director, and screenwriter (born 1923)
- 2005 – Madeline-Ann Aksich, Canadian businesswoman and philanthropist (born 1956)
- 2005 – George Archer, American golfer (born 1939)
- 2005 – Urie Bronfenbrenner, Russian-American psychologist and ecologist (born 1917)
- 2005 – Ghulam Mustafa Khan, Pakistani linguist and critic (born 1912)
- 2005 – M. Scott Peck, American psychiatrist and author (born 1936)
- 2005 – Friedrich Peter, Austrian lawyer and politician (born 1921)
- 2006 – Jeff Cooper, American target shooter and author (born 1920)
- 2006 – John M. Ford, American author and poet (born 1957)
- 2007 – Haidar Abdel-Shafi, Palestinian physician and politician (born 1919)
- 2007 – André Emmerich, German-American art dealer (born 1924)
- 2008 – Derog Gioura, Nauruan politician, 23rd President of Nauru (born 1932)
- 2009 – Alicia de Larrocha, Spanish pianist (born 1923)
- 2009 – Pierre Falardeau, Canadian actor, director, and screenwriter (born 1946)
- 2011 – Wangari Maathai, Kenyan environmentalist and activist, Nobel Prize laureate (born 1940)
- 2012 – Billy Barnes, American composer and songwriter (born 1927)
- 2012 – John Bond, English footballer and manager (born 1932)
- 2012 – Eric Ives, English historian and academic (born 1931)
- 2012 – Alonso Lujambio, Mexican academic and politician (born 1962)
- 2012 – Andy Williams, American singer (born 1927)
- 2013 – Ron Fenton, English footballer, coach, and manager (born 1940)
- 2013 – Choi In-ho, South Korean author and screenwriter (born 1945)
- 2013 – José Montoya, American poet and academic (born 1932)
- 2013 – Billy Mure, American guitarist and composer (born 1915)
- 2013 – Pablo Verani, Italian-Argentinian lawyer and politician (born 1938)
- 2013 – Bennet Wong, Canadian psychiatrist and academic, co-founded Haven Institute (Gabriola Island, Canada) (born 1930)
- 2014 – Ulrick Chérubin, Haitian-Canadian educator and politician (born 1943)
- 2014 – Sulejman Tihić, Bosnian lawyer, judge, and politician (born 1951)
- 2014 – Dorothy Tyler-Odam, English high jumper (born 1920)
- 2015 – Claudio Baggini, Italian Roman Catholic prelate (born 1936)
- 2015 – John Galvin, American general (born 1929)
- 2015 – Tom Kelley, American baseball player and manager (born 1944)
- 2015 – Moti Kirschenbaum, Israeli journalist (born 1939)
- 2016 – José Fernández, Cuban-American baseball player (born 1992)
- 2016 – Arnold Palmer, American golfer (born 1929)
- 2016 – Nahid Hattar, Jordanian writer and political activist (born 1960)
- 2017 – Jan Tříska, Czech actor (born 1936)
- 2023 – David McCallum, Scottish actor (born 1933)

== Holidays and observances ==
- Armed Forces Day or Revolution Day (Mozambique)
- Bangladeshi Immigration Day (United States)
- Christian feast day:
  - Abadir and Iraja and Companions (Coptic Church)
  - Aunarius (Aunacharius)
  - Anathalon (Archdiocese of Milan)
  - Cadoc
  - Ceolfrith
  - Cleopas
  - Euphrosyne of Alexandria
  - Finbarr
  - Fermin of Amiens
  - Lancelot Andrewes (Church of England)
  - Sergius of Radonezh (repose)
  - September 25 (Eastern Orthodox liturgics)
