= Vandas =

Vandas is a surname. Notable people with the surname include:

- Michael Vandas (born 1991), Slovak ice hockey player
- Tomáš Vandas (born 1969), Czech politician

== See also ==
- Vanda (disambiguation)
