= Robertson Ridge =

Robertson Ridge (77°24′S 162°12′E) is a ridge circumscribing the northwest part of Clark Glacier in Victoria Land. It was named by the Advisory Committee on Antarctic Names (US-ACAN) for James D. Robertson, United States Antarctic Research Program (USARP) geophysicist at Byrd Station, 1970–71 season; he participated in the geophysical survey of the Ross Ice Shelf in the 1973-74 and 1974–75 seasons.
