= Vanda (disambiguation) =

Vanda is a genus of the orchid family.

Vanda may also refer to the following:

== Given name ==
- Princess Vanda (originally Wanda), a girl from Polish legend
- Vanda Baranović (born 1970), Croatian basketball player
- Vanda Briedienė (1932–2013), Lithuanian economist, politician, member of the Seimas
- Vanda Felbab-Brown, American expert on internal and international organized crime
- Vanda Godsell (1922–1990), English actress
- Vanda Gomes (born 1988), Brazilian sprinter
- Vanda Gréville (1908–1997), British film actress
- Vanda Hădărean (born 1976), Romanian gymnast
- Vanda Hybnerová (born 1968), Czech stage and film actress
- Vanda Juhász (born 1989), Hungarian javelin thrower
- Vanda Juknaitė (born 1949), Lithuanian writer and playwright
- Vanda Kiszli (born 1993), Hungarian canoeist
- Vanda Kravčionok (born 1969), Lithuanian politician
- Vanda Lukács (born 1992), Hungarian tennis player
- Vanda Maslovska (born 1980), Ukrainian female weightlifter
- Vanda Pignato (born 1963), Brazilian-born Salvadoran lawyer, First Lady of El Salvador
- Vanda Scaravelli (1908–1999), yogi and yoga teacher
- Vanda Semerádová, Czech canoeist
- Vanda Sigurgeirsdóttir (born 1965), Icelandic former multi-sport athlete
- Vanda Skuratovich (1925–2010), Belarusian religious activist
- Vanda Symon (born 1969), New Zealand writer
- Vanda Vályi (born 1999), Hungarian water polo player
- Vanda Vitali, Canadian museum curator
- Vanda Wesenhagen (born 1958), Dutch cricketer

== Surname ==
- Harry Vanda, Australian singer and songwriter
- Matt Vanda (born 1978), American former professional boxer
- Nhim Vanda, Cambodian politician

== Places ==
- Lake Vanda, a small lake in Antarctica
- Vanda, Savar Kundla, a village in Gujarat State, India
- Vanda Station, former Antarctic research base
- Vantaa, a municipality in Finland, known as Vanda in Swedish

== Other uses ==
- Vanda (opera), an opera by Antonín Dvořák
- A brand name for tasimelteon, a drug for a circadian rhythm disorder affecting blind people who are unable to perceive light
