= Dettmar =

Dettmar is a surname and occasional given name. Notable people with this surname include:

- Del Dettmar (born 1947), English musician
- Kevin Dettmar (born 1958), American cultural critic
- Ubirajara Dettmar (1938–2012), Brazilian photographer
- Dettmar Cramer (1925–2015), German football manager

== See also ==
- Dettmer
