= Talud-tablero =

Pre-Columbian Mesoamerican architectural style

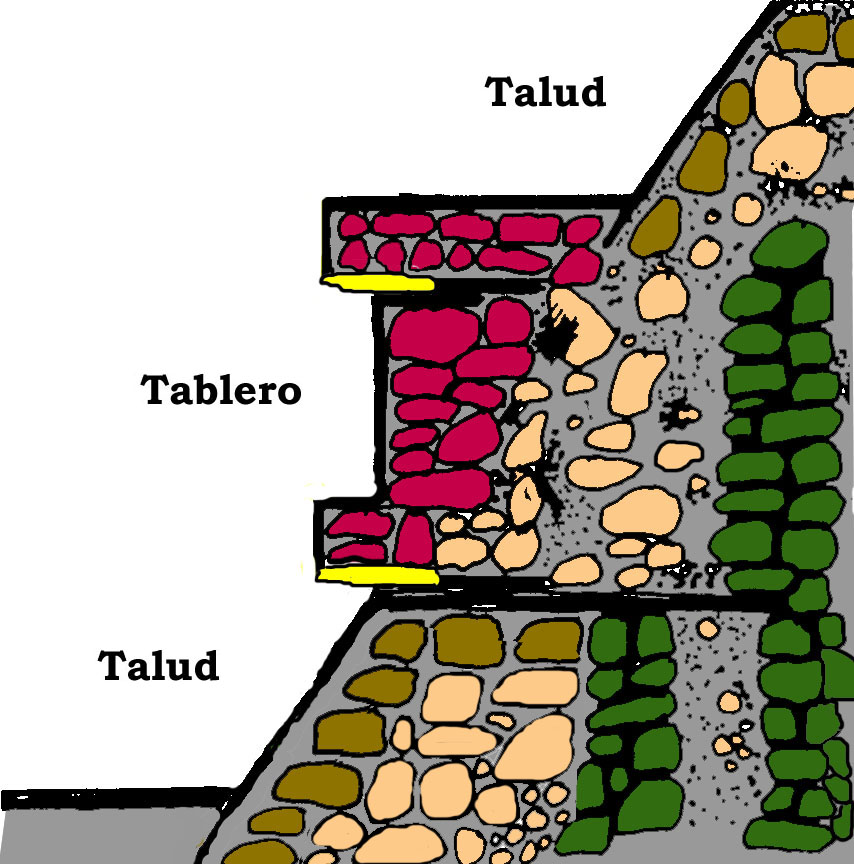
Schematic representation of the talud-tablero style used in many Mesoamerican pyramids and a prominent stylistic feature of Teotihuacano architecture

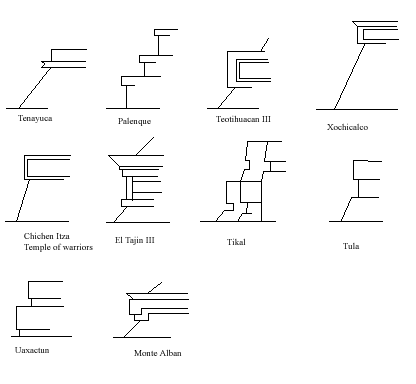
An overview of differing Talud-tablero styles used by different Mesoamerican cultures

Talud-tablero is an architectural style most commonly used in platforms, temples, and pyramids in Pre-Columbian Mesoamerica, becoming popular in the Early Classic Period of Teotihuacan. Talud-tablero consists of an inward-sloping surface or panel called the talud, with a panel or structure perpendicular to the ground sitting upon the slope called the tablero. This may also be referred to as the slope-and-panel style.

== Cultural significance ==
Talud-tablero was often employed in pyramid construction, found in Pre-Columbian Mesoamerica. It is found in many cities and cultures but is strongly associated with the Teotihuacan culture of central Mexico, where it is a dominant architectural style. Talud-tablero's appearance in many cities during and after Teotihuacan's apogee is thought to be indicative of the city's powerful influence in Mesoamerica as a trade, art, and cultural center, with the architectural style serving to either emulate Teotihuacan or affiliate the cities together. Teotihuacan's influence was especially evident in newer settlements that developed during the Early Classic Period, which adopted the talud-tablero architectural style and may have utilized guidance from the city to become trading centers themselves. After the fall of Teotihuacan, other cities may have adopted the talud-tablero style not for its direct affiliation with Teotihuacan, but because of the power it symbolized due to the many successful cultures that had adopted it.

Many different variants on the talud-tablero style arose throughout Mesoamerica, developing and manifesting themselves differently among the various cultures. In some cases, such as the Maya city of Tikal, the introduction of talud-tablero architecture during the Early Classic corresponds with direct contact with Teotihuacan and possible domination or conquest. However, the form of contact at other cities is less well documented and presumably included trade and cultural contacts. A competing theory by Juan Pedro Laporte postulates that Tikal may have developed talud-tablero independently from Teotihuacan based on their extensive use of apron molding in their architecture that may have been a precursor to the slope-and-panel.

== Sites featuring Talud-tablero ==
The earliest examples of talud-tablero constructions date not from the Teotihuacan Early Classic Period, however, but are found in Pre-Classic constructions in the Tlaxcala-Puebla region, with the oldest known dating to c. 200 BC in the Mexican city of Tlalancaleca. It is unknown if Teotihuacan developed their version of the style based on that of Tlalancaleca or if they did so independently. Teotihuacan strongly influenced many other cities which allowed for the architectural style of talud-tablero to be adapted into these cities all over Mesoamerica. Cities and their structures using talud-tablero include:

- Cholula-Epiclassic Period- Evidence of talud-tablero was found in previous pyramids beneath the final layer of the Great Pyramid. Talud-tablero is also mimicked in the creation of the terraces at Cholula.
- Kaminaljuyu site in Guatemala-Classic Period- Talud-tablero style tombs were used for the elite of the city.
- Matacapan-Classic Period- The center pyramid of the city was created using the talud-tablero style after the city was directly influenced by Teotihuacan.
- Monte Albán-Classic Period- Many structures in Monte Alban have a similar style to Teotihuacan's talud-tablero, but with a modified panel.
- Nakum- Nakum used thetalud-tablero style on the interior side of four pyramids that surrounded Patio 1 in the city.
- Teotihuacan- Most structures in Teotihuacan were created by using the talud-tablero style. The most notable structures using talud-tablero include the Temple of the Sun, Temple of the Moon, and Temple of Quetzalcoatl. In fact, the Temple of the Moon's courtyard flows from a smaller talud-tablero that abuts the pyramid.
- Tikal-Classic Period- Tikal has a structure using talud-tablero that dates to around A.D. 200 and the next large structure seeming to be directly influenced by Teotihuacan with talud-tablero on two sides of a pyramid.
- Xochicalco- The greatest structure of Xochicalco is the Temple of the Feathered Serpent that was created using talud-tablero.
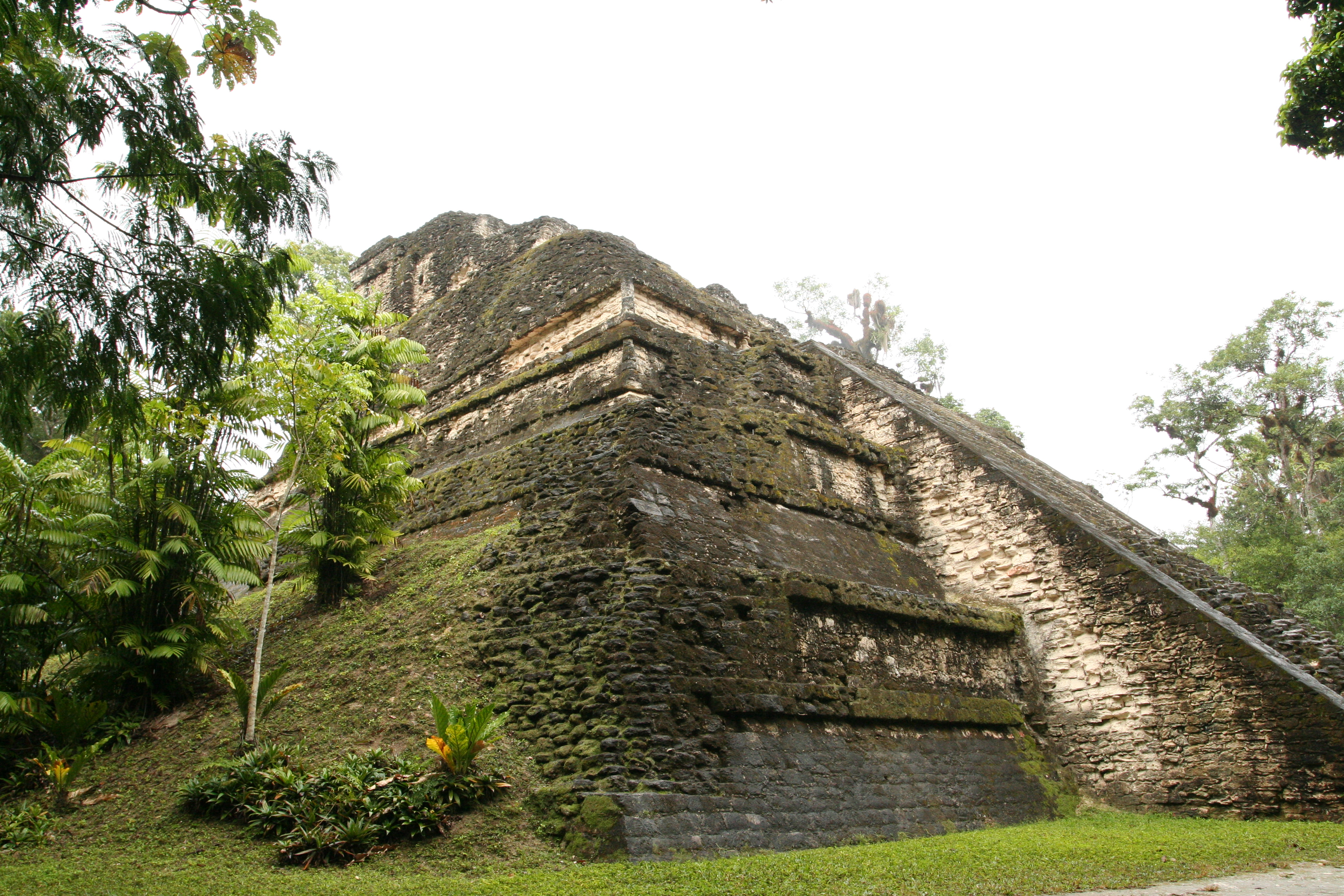
Talud-tablero in Tikal Structure 5C-49

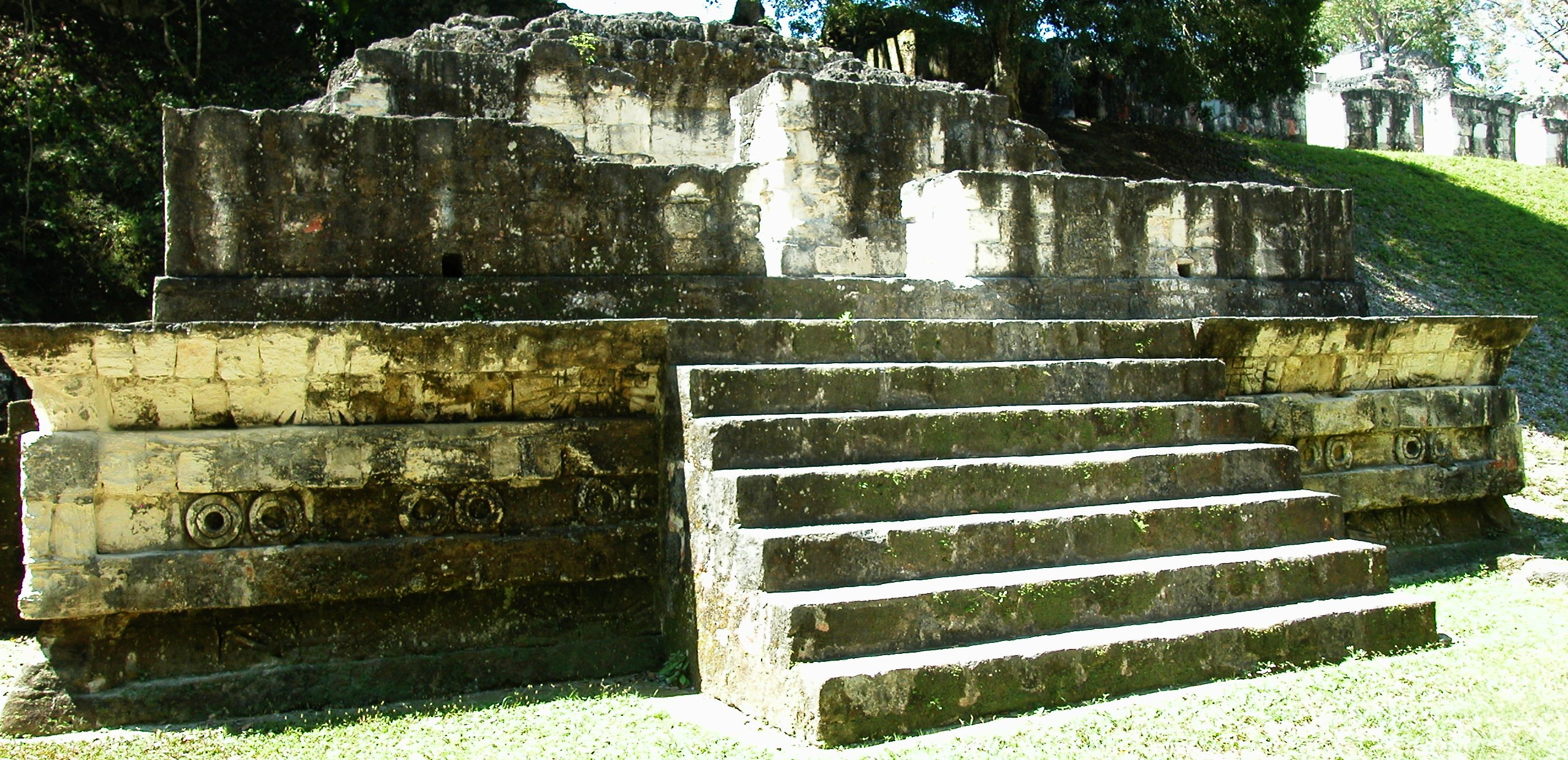
Example of Talud Tablero Architecture in Tikal

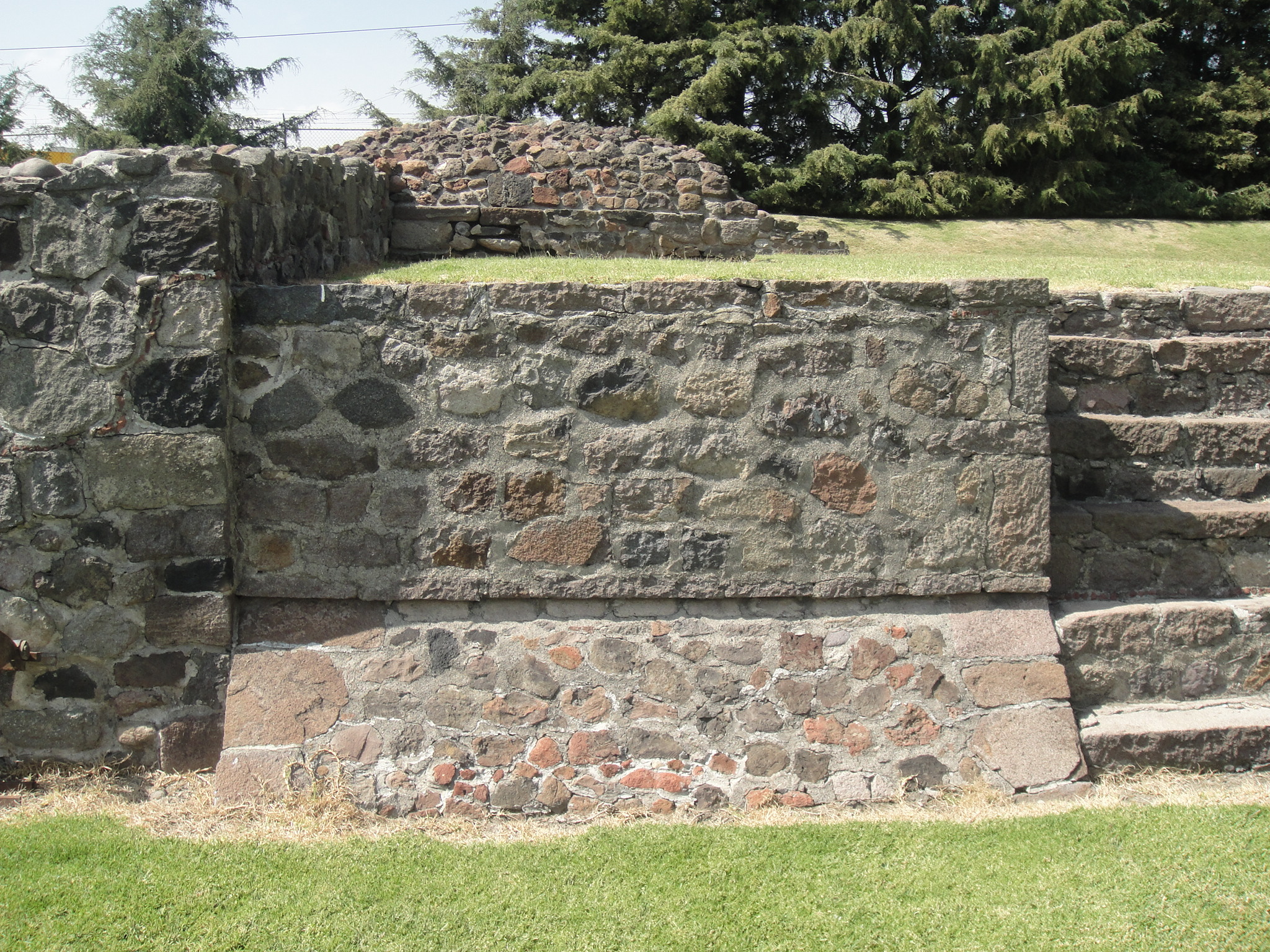
Talud-tablero in Structure 17 at Calixtlahuaca

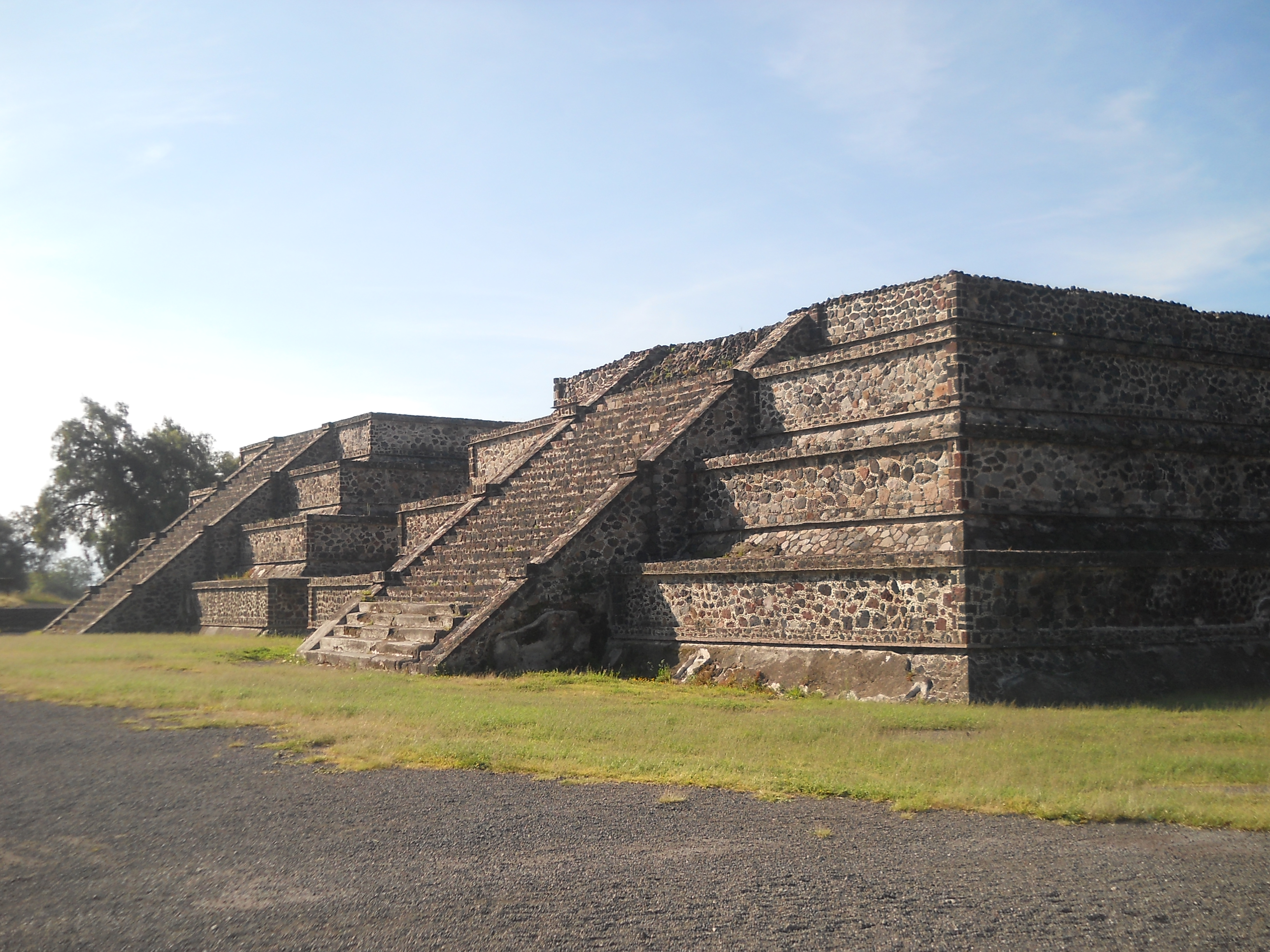
Talud-tablero present on platform along Avenue of the Dead, Teotihuacan

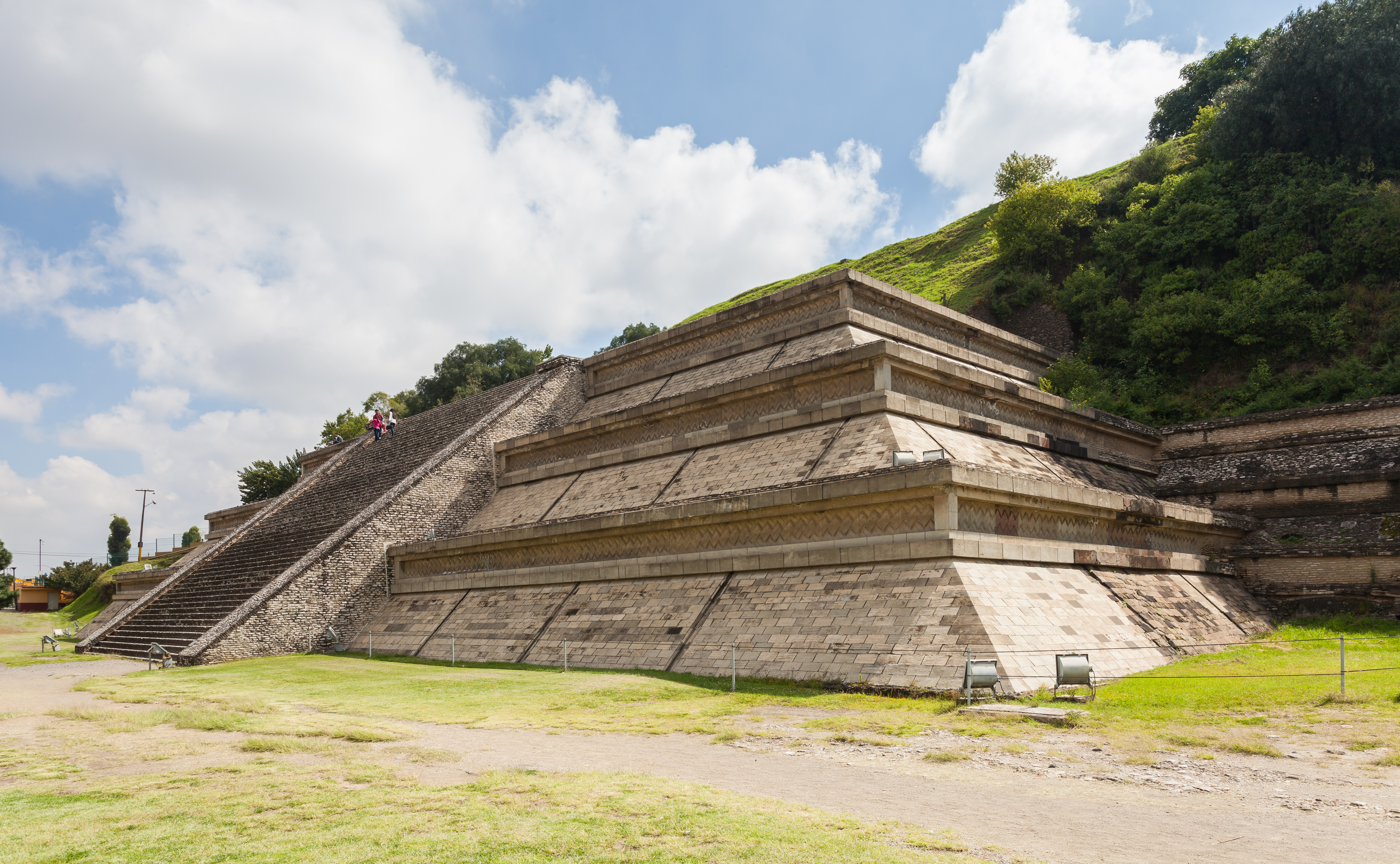
Great Pyramid of Cholula, Puebla, Mexico

Other sites where talud-tablero architecture can be found include but are not limited to:

Use of talud-tablero architecture of sites by period of construction.
Early Classic	Middle Classic	Late Classic	Post Classic
Cholula	Tonina	Mitla	Tulum
Becan	Dzibilchaltun	Mexiquito	Tancah
Teotihuacan	Chinkultic	Teotenango	Tlatelolco
Edzna	Cacaxtla	Tula	Tenochititlan
Tepeapulco	Xochicalco	Chichen Itza	
Solano	El Ixtepete		
Tikal	Copán		
Monte Albán			
Calixtlahuaca			
Yohulichan			
Ake			
Kaminaljuyu			
Oxkintok			
Matacapan			
Tazumal			
Tingambato			
El Tajín			
Palenque			

== See also ==
- Mesoamerican architecture
