= Dettmer =

Dettmer is a surname. Notable people with the surname include:

- Bob Dettmer (born 1951), American politician
- Brian Dettmer (born 1974), American contemporary artist
- Colin Dettmer
- Douglas Dettmer (born 1964), Church of England archdeacon
- John Dettmer (born 1970), American baseball player

== See also ==
- Dettmar
