= Bernie Voorheis =

American basketball player

Personal information
- Born: May 23, 1922 Spencerport, New York, U.S.
- Died: January 14, 2010 (aged 87) Spencerport, New York, U.S.
- Listed height: 5 ft 10 in (1.78 m)
- Listed weight: 150 lb (68 kg)

Career information
- High school: Churchville-Chili (Churchville, New York)
- College: Cornell (1939–1942)

Career history
- 1946: Rochester Royals

Career highlights
- NBL champion (1946)

Bernard C. Voorheis (May 23, 1922 – January 14, 2010) played professional basketball for the Rochester Royals, appearing in eight games in 1946, a year in which the team won the National Basketball League (NBL) championship.

He grew up in the outlying Rochester suburb of Spencerport, New York, learning to play basketball in his father's barn. In 1938, he graduated from Churchville-Chili High School.

In 1946, he was playing semi-pro basketball for the Atlas Wreckers. Basketball Hall of Famer Les Harrison, the Royals coach at the time, saw Voorheis play and, noting his speed and ball-handling skills, signed him to a contract.

After his brief professional playing career, Voorheis went to work for Eastman Kodak for 35 years; he retired in 1983.
