= Vera Zakharova =

Soviet Yakut pilot (1920–2010)

Vera Kirillovna Zakharova
- Вера Кирилловна Захарова
- Born: 12 July 1920; Delgey, RSFSR
- Died: 1 January 2010 (aged 89); Yakutsk, Russian Federation
- Military career
- Allegiance: Soviet Union
- Branch: Soviet Air Force
- Service years: 1943–1945
- Unit: 141st Separate Medical Aviation Regiment
- Conflicts: World War II
- Awards: Order of the Patriotic War

Vera Kirillovna Zakharova (Russian: Вера Кирилловна Захарова; 12 July 1920 – 1 January 2010) was a Po-2 air ambulance pilot in the Soviet Air Force during World War II, a student of aviation pioneer Valery Kuzmin, and the first Yakut woman pilot.

== Early life ==
Zakharova was born on 12 July 1920 in the village of Delgey, Yakutsk Oblast, located within the present-day Olyokminsky district of Sakha; she had seven siblings. Her father Kirill, a Yakut, was a schoolteacher, and her mother Yevdokiya, a Russian was a doctor. Because her mother was not fluent in the Yakut language, Vera often helped her by being a translator. Soon after she was born her family moved to the village of Churapcha, where her father was from. There she completed primary school before moving to Yakutsk in 1934. In autumn the next year her brother Innokenty joined the local glider flight school, leading to Vera joining in 1937 and becoming the first Yakut girl admitted to the aeroclub. There she learned to fly the Po-2 trainer under the instruction of Valery Kuzmin, the first Yakut pilot. Soon she earned the status of parachute instructor after completing her 19th parachute jump. In 1940 she moved to Moscow to attend the Moscow Aviation School, but due to enrollment delay she initially attended the Moscow Institute of Physical Culture. However, she attended only one semester before leaving due to financial difficulties, which forced her to return to Yakutsk.

== World War II ==
Vera and her friends heard the news of the German invasion of the Soviet Union over the radio while playing a game of volleyball. Her brothers were subsequently conscripted into the Red Army. Seeing her brothers drafted, Vera wished to join the war effort, so she attended nursing courses and was almost deployed, but she was turned away in Irkutsk. Not giving up, she continued to request to be sent to the front. Allegedly their father, who was ill with tuberculosis, expressed concerns about her brother's inability to speak Russian being a problem on the front. That, along with allegations that he expressed sympathies for the tsarist government, led to his subsequent arrest and execution under Article 58 as an "enemy of the people". Vera was informed of her father's death in 1943. However, she remained loyal to the Soviet Union and continued to request to be sent to the warfront. Initially she and other parachute instructors from the aeroclub were tasked with training paratroopers for the front. Eventually in February 1944 she along with two of her Russian friends from the Yakutsk aeroclub, Yelena Dvoryankina and Anna Remennikova, who were also parachute instructors, approached a recruiter requesting to be sent to the front and were accepted. Later the recruiter admitted to being half-asleep at the time, and normally would not have accepted them.

After a brief stay with a training regiment, Vera and her friend Yelena were assigned to the 141st Separate Air Ambulance Regiment, which ferried injured soldiers in the Po-2, as well as delivering information and mail across the front. Upon arriving at regiment headquarters the women were initially treated with hostility by commanding officers, with the regimental commander jokingly asking if they dreamt of becoming colonels, to which Yelena replied affirmatively to the taunt, causing dead silence before their male counterparts burst out laughing at the idea. Not giving in to peer pressure, Zakharova remained in the regiment, and by August 1944 she totaled over 100 sorties, in the course of which she rescued over 200 wounded soldiers as well as delivering crucial medical supplies, ammunition, mail, and food to the front lines, sometimes flying three or four sorties in a day.

On 6 or 7 August 1944 while flying in over Poland she and two other aircraft flying with her were shot down by anti-aircraft guns. The regimental commander, Nikolai Petrov, who was piloting one of the planes shot down, managed to make an emergency landing in a deserted area, and was rescued by Red Army infantry. However, Zakharova and the other pilot, Ivan Chesnokov, were not as lucky; Chesnokov landed in an area occupied by SS troops, who tortured him before killing him. Meanwhile, Zakharova landed in an area occupied by the Wehrmacht. After landing she checked on both of the wounded soldiers she was transporting to ensure that they were ok, but almost immediately the German soldiers began to approach her and her plane, hurling verbal abuse at her as they came. Several then proceeded to grab Vera, tearing off her belt with her pistol and her helmet, releasing her black hair over her face to the shock of onlooking troops, who yelled out "Frau", surprised that the pilot they found was a woman. Upon hearing machine-gun fire the Germans surrounding her dispersed and ran towards the noise. Temporarily away from the German soldiers, she only then realized that she had an open fracture in her leg; weakened by the injury and fearing return of the Germans, she grabbed documents from her plane and crawled away from the landing site before starting to dig a hole to hide in by a tree. One of the wounded soldiers she was transporting met up with her there, and together they tried to crawl over to Soviet-controlled territory, hiding in a rye field along the way. However, their location was revealed once the Germans used dogs to search for them. After the dog pounced on her its handler arrived and grabbed at her; initially she feared her was going to grab her throat and strangle her, but instead he reached for her parachutist badge and yanked it off her uniform. A group of German soldiers proceeded to take her and the other injured soldier prisoner, dragging them to a shed on stretchers. A doctor treated their injuries before they were loaded onto a freight train to be sent to POW camp. Upon arrival the Germans told the prisoners and camp staff about Vera, declaring “This is a shot down Soviet pilot! The end of the Russians has come: there is no one to fight in the Red Army, and the Bolsheviks are putting Mongol women on their planes!", even going so far as to claim she was an officer with the rank of major, even though she was a newly enlisted private. At the prison camp she was frequently asked by other inmates where she was from, and resigned to answering simply "Russia" since few had heard of Yakutia or knew where it was. Held in the camp for five months and fifteen days, she worked at a sewing machine in the garment workshop. After being freed from the camp she was interrogated by SMERSH and they told her that she should be demobilized for medical reasons, but she insisted on remaining in the military and then spent two and a half months seeking out her regiment; by the time she returned, it had been renamed as the 12th Aviation Regiment and based in Poland to assist the Polish Air Force. She continued to fly missions on the Po-2, totally 180 sorties by the end of the war, after which she carved "Zakharova from Yakutsk" on the walls of the Reichstag, having reached Berlin.

== Postwar ==
After the war she married Anatoly Shmatkov, a pilot from her regiment, and they initially settled in Bryansk. Due to Anatoly's job as a prosecutor they had to move frequently, often taking nothing but the sewing machine and their children. After her husband died of a heart attack in 1965 she returned to Yakutsk; she then worked at the local branch of the Institute of Cosmophysics and Aeronomy of the Soviet Academy of Sciences, and from 1976 to 1983 she served on the Soviet peace committee. She died in Yakutsk in 2010.
