= Rolf Thieme =

German hockey player

Personal information
- Nationality: German
- Born: 9 March 1944 Leipzig, Germany
- Died: 5 January 2010 (aged 65) Leipzig, Germany

Sport
- Sport: Field hockey

Rolf Thieme (9 March 1944 – 5 January 2010) was a German field hockey player. He competed in the men's tournament at the 1968 Summer Olympics.
