= Thomas Cullinan (South African cricketer) =

South African cricketer (1946–2010)

Thomas David Cullinan
Personal information
- Full name: Thomas David Cullinan
- Born: 14 June 1946
- Died: 24 January 2010 (aged 63)
- Source: Cricinfo, 26 April 2020

Thomas Cullinan (14 June 1946 – 24 January 2010) was a South African cricketer who played in four first-class matches for North Eastern Transvaal in the 1968/69 season.
