= Kittu Suresh =

Indian cricketer (1945–2010)

Personal information
- Full name: Kittu Gundappa Suresh
- Born: 27 February 1945
- Died: 6 January 2010 (aged 64)
- Source: ESPNcricinfo, 26 April 2020

Kittu Suresh (27 February 1945 – 6 January 2010) was an Indian cricketer who played in twenty-three first-class matches for Mysore between 1966 and 1972.
