= Jack Kerness =

Art director (1911–2010)

Jack Kerness (January 30, 1911 – January 9, 2010) was an art director for five Hollywood studios over his 70-year career working with such directors as Alfred Hitchcock and others.

He spent 37 years at Columbia Pictures and is noted for creating what is considered one of the best movie posters of all time. The poster is of Rita Hayworth starring in the title role of "Gilda." Noted photographer Robert Coburn took the full-length color Kodachrome while Jack Kerness acted as the art director, creating a sultry image of Hayworth in a Jean Louis gown.

== Death ==
Kerness died on January 9, 2010, in Canoga Park, California, at age 98 after a short stay at the Motion Picture Hospital. The cause of death was listed as natural causes.
