= A. M. Bakalar =

Polish author

A. M. Bakalar (born 3 March 1975, born Joanna Zgadzaj) is a Polish author, writing in English. Her novels are Madame Mephisto (2012) and Children of Our Age (2017).

== Early life ==
Bakalar was born in Wroclaw, Poland. She studied at the University of Wroclaw, Poland, from which she graduated with a BA and MA in English Literature. In 2004 she emigrated to the UK. Between 2007 and 2011 she was a PhD student of postcolonial studies and comparative literature at Birkbeck College, University of London and University of Southampton. Bakalar wrote the draft of her first novel during her PhD studies.

== Career ==
Bakalar's opinion pieces, stories and book reviews have appeared in The Guardian, The New York Times, the Los Angeles Review of Books, Boundless Magazine, Words Without Borders, Wasafiri, BBC Radio 4, and elsewhere. She was the guest editor of Litro Poland Issue.

Her first book, the novel Madame Mephisto, was published in April 2012. The novel was well received by the critics. In The Times Literary Supplement, Max Liu wrote that "Bakalar...captures how isolating London can be for newcomers", while Lucy Popescu, writing in the Huffington Post, called it "a darkly-comic account of a Polish immigrant’s experiences in London". The book was a reader nomination for the 2012 Guardian First Book Award.

Her second novel, Children of Our Age, published in October 2017, is an exploration of modern-day human trafficking by Poles living in the UK. The novel received a starred review in Publishers Weekly which called it "enthralling" and praised its "skillful storytelling". Mary Rodgers, writing for the Los Angeles Review of Books, called it an "unflinching yet ultimately compassionate second novel" and "an ambitious work of great scope and power". In the Times Literary Supplement, Ania Ready described it as a "novel about the power of language to estrange and, occasionally, connect".

Bakalar lives in London, UK.

== Books ==
- Madame Mephisto (2012), ISBN 978-0957132603
- Children of Our Age (2017), ISBN 978-0993377334
