= Bernie Weintraub =

- Born: Bernie Weintraub; September 2, 1933; Bronx, New York, United States
- Died: January 16, 2010 (aged 76); Los Angeles, California, United States
- Occupation(s): Literary agent, Talent agent
- Spouse: Ellie Weintraub

Bernie Martin Weintraub (September 2, 1933 – January 16, 2010) was an American talent agent and founding partner of the Paradigm Talent Agency in 1993.

== Early life ==
Weintraub was born in the Bronx, New York. He served in the United States military during the Korean War.

== Career ==
Weintraub co-founded Robinson Weintraub (Robinson, Weintraub, Gross and Associates), a "boutique" literary agency. In 1993, Robinson Weintraub merged with several other literary and talent agencies to form the Paradigm Talent Agency, with Weintraub becoming one of Paradigm's founding partners.

Over the course of his career, Weintraub acted as an agent for clients who worked on major television series throughout the industry. His client list included Murphy Brown, I Love Lucy, The Cosby Show, The Jackie Gleason Show, M*A*S*H, All in the Family, Sanford & Son, Maude, Diff'rent Strokes and Roseanne.

Upon retirement, Weintraub sold his share of the business to Paradigm chairman Sam Gores. He served on the board of directors of Cedar-Sinai Hospital in Los Angeles.

Bernie Weintraub died on January 16, 2010, in Los Angeles at the age of 76. He was survived by his wife, Ellie, and children, Danny and Lizzie. Bernie and Ellie Weintraub had been married for 52 years.
