= Churchville-Chili Central School District =

School district in New York, United States

Location
- 139 Fairbanks Road; Churchville, New York 14428-9797 Rochester, New York United States

District information
- Type: Public
- Motto: Where learning leads to a lifetime of opportunities...
- Grades: K-12
- Established: 1950
- Superintendent: Carmine Peluso
- Budget: $91,602,093

Students and staff
- Students: 3668
- Teachers: 366
- Staff: 823
- District mascot: Saints
- Colors: Orange and Black

Other information
- Notes: Schooltree
- Website: CCCSD Home

The Churchville-Chili Central School District (CCCSD) is a public school district in Monroe County, New York, near Rochester. The district enrolls approximately 3,889 students in grades K-12 from the towns of Chili, Ogden, Riga, Sweden, and Churchville. District employees number 823 under an operating budget of $91,602,093 for the 2021-2022 school year.

Average class size is 19 to 24 students, and the student-teacher ratio is 11:1 for the elementary schools and 12:1 for the middle and high schools.

== Schools and facilities ==
The CCCSD offers three elementary schools (K-4), one middle school (5-8), and a high school (10-12) with a ninth-grade subdivision. The six schools are on three campuses. Additionally, the CCCSD operates a transportation facility. This facility transports over 4,200 students through the year to over 65 surrounding schools.

Facility	Location
Chestnut Ridge Elementary School	3560 Chili Avenue, Rochester NY, 14624
Churchville Elementary School	36 West Buffalo Street, Churchville NY, 14428
Fairbanks Road Elementary School	145 Fairbanks Road, Churchville NY, 14428
Churchville-Chili Middle School	139 Fairbanks Road, Churchville NY, 14428
Churchville-Chili Senior High School	5786 Buffalo Road, Churchville NY, 14428
Ninth Grade Academy	137 Fairbanks Road, Churchville NY, 14428
Transportation Facility	3461 Westside Drive, Churchville NY, 14428

== Board of education ==
The CCCSD Board of Education consists of 9 members who serve on rotating three-year terms. Annual elections are held in May to select board members and vote on the budget.

== Student performance ==
For the 2018-2019 school year, the CCCSD enrolled a total of 3,816 K-12 public school students. Student performance is measured according to New York State's standardized examinations including English Language Arts (ELA) in grades 3-8, Science in grades 4 and 8, and the Regents Exam for English, Math, Science, and Social Studies in high school. These performance exams classify each student's performance as follows: Level 1 - Not Proficient, Level 2 - Partially Proficient, Level 3 - Proficient, Level 4 - Advanced Proficient. Students considered as proficient have tested at level 3 (proficient) and level 4 (advanced proficient). The results below include the percent of students who achieved a 3 and 4 performance level for the 2018/19 school year.

Proficiency Exam - 2018/19 School Year	Proficiency Score
Grade 3 ELA	50%
Grade 4 ELA	40%
Grade 5 ELA	39%
Grade 6 ELA	50%
Grade 7 ELA	46%
Grade 8 ELA	45%
Grade 3 Math	56%
Grade 4 Math	62%
Grade 5 Math	56%
Grade 6 Math	56%
Grade 7 Math	60%
Grade 8 Math	50%
Grade 4 Science	92%
Grade 8 Science	76%
Annual Regents Examination in ELA	89%
Annual Regents Examination Algebra I	80%
Annual Regents Examination Geometry	80%
Annual Regents Examination Algebra II	85%
Annual Regents Examination Living Environment	87%
Annual Regents Examination Physical Setting/Earth Science	70%
Annual Regents Examination Physical Setting/Chemistry	88%
Annual Regents Examination Physical Setting/Physics	84%
Annual Regents Transitional Exam in Global History & Geography	44%
Annual Regents Examination U.S. History & Government	89%

== Notable alumni ==
- Renée Fleming, professional vocalist
- Tim Redding (1996), professional baseball player
