= Valery Kuzmin =

- Born: Valery Ilyich Kuzmin; November 7, 1918; Innyakh, Olyokminsky District, Yakut ASSR, RSFSR
- Died: June 1, 1983 (aged 64); Yakutsk, Soviet Union
- Awards: Hero of Socialist Labour

Valery Ilyich Kuzmin (Russian: Валерий Ильич Кузьмин; 7 November 1918 – 1 June 1983) was an aviation pioneer in Yakutia who became the director of the Yakutsk division of Aeroflot, the Soviet state airline, a recipient of the titles Honoured Pilot of the USSR as well as Hero of Socialist Labor. He was also the first ethnic Yakut pilot.
