= Sefis Anastasakos =

Greek politician, author, lawyer, and activist

Sefis Anastasakos (Greek: Σέφης Αναστασάκος; 1942–25 January 2010) was a Greek politician, author, lawyer and activist.

== Activities ==
As the president of the Borrowers’ Association, Anastasakos helped in consumer protection.

== Death ==
On 25 January 2010 he died of cancer.
