= Edgar Vos =

Dutch fashion designer

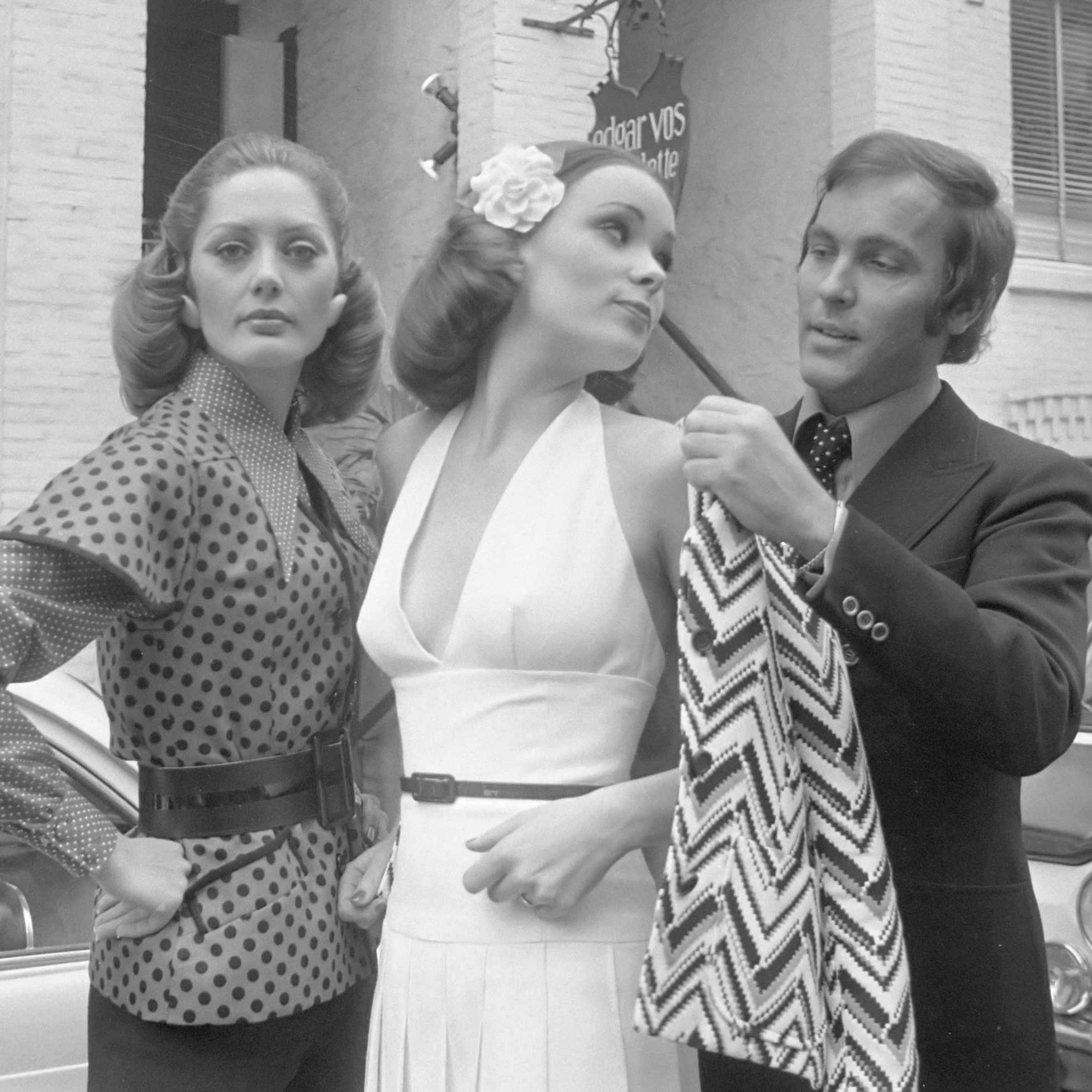
- Edgar Vos (1972)
- Born: 5 July 1931; Makassar, Celebes, Dutch East Indies
- Died: 13 January 2010 (aged 78); Fort Lauderdale, Florida, USA
- Education: Gerrit Rietveld Academie
- Occupation: Fashion designer
- Label: Edgar Vos Boutique

Edgar Vos (5 July 1931 – 13 January 2010) was a Dutch fashion designer.

== Early life ==
Vos was born in Makassar in the Dutch East Indies (now Indonesia) in 1931. He studied fashion at the Gerrit Rietveld Academie in Amsterdam.

He started a chain of fifteen boutique clothing stores known as Edgar Vos Boutiques.

Vos died of a heart attack while holidaying in Fort Lauderdale, Florida, a day after being admitted to a hospital suffering from what is suspected to have been pneumonia. He was 78.

He is survived by his partner, Geert Eijsbouts.
