= Robert Gerard (footballer) =

Belgian footballer

Personal information
- Date of birth: 23 December 1920
- Place of birth: Lier, Belgium
- Date of death: 16 January 2010 (aged 89)

International career
Years	Team	Apps	(Gls)
1944–1945	Belgium	2	(0)

Robert Gerard (23 December 1920 – 16 January 2010) was a Belgian footballer. He played in two matches for the Belgium national football team from 1944 to 1945.
