= Edward Lovelady =

English footballer

Personal information
- Date of birth: 24 June 1898
- Place of birth: Liverpool, England
- Height: 5 ft 9 in (1.75 m)
- Position: Outside right

Senior career*
Years	Team	Apps	(Gls)
- Bangor City
1924–1925	Wrexham	10	(0)
1925	Bangor City		
- Marine
- Bangor City
- Winsford United
- * Club domestic league appearances and goals

Edward R. Lovelady (24 June 1898 – after 1925) was an English professional footballer who played as an inside right. He made appearances in the English Football League for Wrexham. He also played for Bangor City, Marine and Winsford United.
