= Ubirajara Dettmar =

Brazilian photojournalist

- Dettmar in March 2010
- Born: March 6, 1938; Rio de Janeiro, Brazil
- Died: October 2, 2012 (aged 74); Rio de Janeiro, Brazil
- Occupation: Photographer
- Known for: Photography documenting significant events in Brazil and serving as the official photographer for President Fernando Collor de Mello

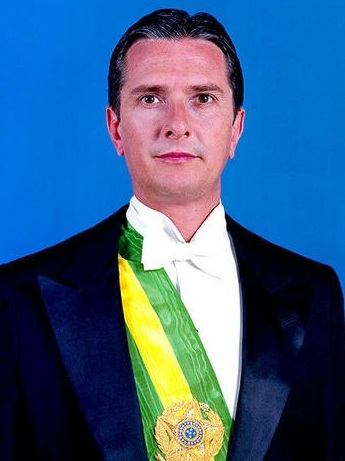
Official portrait of Fernando Collor de Mello, 1992

Ubirajara Dettmar was a Brazilian photographer. He documented a wide range of events, including weddings, funerals, revolutions, and armed conflicts, both within Brazil and internationally. Dettmar was the official photographer for President Fernando Collor de Mello.

Throughout his career, Dettmar contributed to major media outlets in the country, including O Cruzeiro, Manchete, Veja, Diário de Notícias, Correio da Manhã, Última Hora, Folha de S.Paulo, and O Globo. He was also the photographer for the Supreme Federal Court (STF), the Superior Court of Justice (STJ), and the Superior Electoral Court (TSE), capturing the official portraits of numerous ministers.

Dettmar wrote several books about photography.

== Personal life ==
Dettmar lived in various cities throughout his life, including Brasília, São Paulo, and the United States, where he met his wife Sandra, who also became a photographer.

=== Death ===
Dettmar died at the age of 74 in Rio de Janeiro, due to health issues related to a liver disease called hemochromatosis. The President of the Supreme Federal Court (STF), Minister Ayres Britto, expressed his condolences for the death of Ubirajara Dettmar.
