= Claus Gerson =

American field hockey player (1917–2010)

Personal information
- Full name: Claus Oscar Gerson
- Nationality: American
- Born: November 12, 1917 Hamburg, Germany
- Died: January 22, 2010 (aged 92) Great Neck, New York, U.S.

Sport
- Sport: Field hockey

Claus Oscar Gerson (November 12, 1917 – January 22, 2010) was an American field hockey player. He competed in the men's tournament at the 1948 Summer Olympics.
