= Peter Thomson (priest) =

Priest

Peter Ashley Thomson AM (19 March 1936 – 15 January 2010) was an Australian Anglican priest, best known for influencing Tony Blair, the future British prime minister, while they were both at St John's College, Oxford. He also influenced Geoff Gallop, who later became Premier of Western Australia. His thought was deeply influenced by the Scottish philosopher John Macmurray.

Thomson studied for the priesthood at Ridley College, an evangelical theological college in Melbourne, but became more radical in his Christianity and passionate about politics as a way for Christians to achieve their social objectives.

After several jobs, Thomson attended Oxford to study for two years, where a group of undergraduates gathered around him and were influenced by his approach to politics. This group included both Blair and Gallop. Blair has stated that Thomson awakened his concern for a Christian approach to left-wing politics.
