= Carlos Bonilla Chávez =

Ecuadorian guitarist (1923–2010)

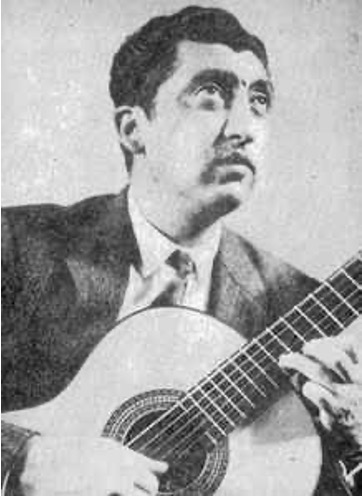
- Bonilla in 1954

Background information
- Born: Carlos Galo Raúl Bonilla Chávez; 21 March 1923; Quito, Ecuador
- Died: 10 January 2010 (aged 86)
- Genres: Classical
- Occupations: Musician; music educator
- Instrument: Guitar
- Years active: 1930s–1985

Carlos Galo Raúl Bonilla Chávez, better known as Carlos Bonilla (21 March 1923 – 10 January 2010) was a pioneer of Ecuadorian classical guitar and an important figure in 20th-century Ecuadorian music.

== Biography ==
Bonilla was born in Quito and studied at the Conservatorio Nacional de Música de Quito, where in 1952 he became professor of guitar and composition.

In 1962, Bonilla founded the first guitar department at the National Conservatory of Music in Quito, Ecuador. Sought after to perform many of his own compositions which featured solo guitar and orchestra, Bonilla frequently performed with the National Symphony Orchestra of Ecuador and the Colombian Philharmonic Orchestra. Ever since the Ecuadorian National Symphony Orchestra was established in 1956, Bonilla served as principal contrabass until his retirement in 1985. He also performed a contrabass solo, Concert of Cañonery, accompanied on the piano by his brother Hector Bonilla.

== Compositions ==
- Mil años de música for orchestra
- Raíces, for guitare & orchestra
- Rumiñahui for orchestra
- Chasqui
- Suite andina
- Eco andino
- Acuarela indígena
- Atahualpa (yumbo)
- Tambores shyris
- Ponchito al hombro
- Indiecito otavaleño
- Elegía y danza, for guitar (Paris, Éditions Max Eschig)
- Preludio y Yumbo, for guitar (Paris, Éditions Max Eschig)
- Beatriz (pasillo)
- Subyugante (pasillo)
- Cantares del alma (pasillo)
- Sueña mi bien (pasillo)
- Idílica, (pasillo)
- Pasillo No. 2
- Nocturno (pasillo)
- Solo tú (pasillo).

== Bibliography ==
- Alexander, Francisco. Música y músicos. Ensayos en miniatura. Quito: Edited by Casa de la Cultura Ecuatoriana, 1970.
- Montúfar, Alfonso. 'Carlos Bonilla Chávez'. In: Letras del Ecuador, No. 128. Quito, 1963
- Stevenson, Robert. 2001. "Quito". The New Grove Dictionary of Music and Musicians, second edition, edited by Stanley Sadie & John Tyrrel. London: Macmillan Publishers; New York: Grove's Dictionaries of Music.
