= Vanda, Savar Kundla =

Village in Gujarat state, India

Vanda is a village in the Savar Kundla Taluka (Tehsil) of Amreli District, in the Indian state of Gujarat. There is a temple named Jay amrima temple. Vanda village Pin Code : 364525

It is connected by road and falls on the Savar Kundla–Jesar Highway.

It is about 270 km south-west of the state capital Gandhinagar, and about 45 km south-east of Amreli city of Amreli District.

There are total 82 Villages in Savar Kundla Taluka, including Kunkavav (Pin Code : 364515), famous for the Hathila-Ni-Vav and Varahi Mata Mandir.
