= Josephus Tethool =

Josephus Tethool (1 April 1934 – 18 January 2010) was the Roman Catholic titular bishop of Apisa Maius and the auxiliary bishop of the Roman Catholic Diocese of Amboina, Indonesia.

Ordained to the priesthood on 20 December 1961, Tethool was named bishop on 2 April 1982 and was ordained on 26 September 1982. Bishop Tethool retired on 1 April 2009.
