= Rosalie Abrams =

American dramatist

- Born: Rosalie M. Gresser; October 13, 1921; Pittsburgh, Pennsylvania, United States
- Died: January 4, 2010 (aged 88); Anaheim, California, United States
- Occupations: Playwright; Actor; Activist
- Known for: Founder of the Orange County Feminist Repertory Theater; Founder of Orange County's National Organization for Women

Rosalie Abrams (October 13, 1921 – January 4, 2010) was an American feminist playwright, actress and activist. She founded the Orange County Feminist Repertory Theater and the first chapter of the National Organization for Women in Orange County, California.

== Early personal life and education ==
Rosalie Gresser Abrams was born in Pittsburgh, Pennsylvania in 1921. Her parents were Naomi and Albert Gresser. Eventually she married Maurice Abrams, and with their two children, they moved to Los Angeles, California in 1954. By 1960 they had moved to Anaheim. She obtained her bachelors (1971) and masters (1975), theater arts, from California State University, Fullerton. In the 1970s she took up tap dancing, and performed into her 80s.

== Career and activism ==
=== Feminist activism in Orange County ===
In September 1969, Abrams founded the first chapter of the National Organization for Women (NOW) in Orange County, California, which was also the first major feminist organization in the county. In 1970 she served as vice president and the following year, she was president. The organization would find its base membership with members of the Unitarian faith, where Abrams was an active member. Abrams stated that many of the women who attended did so in secret, not wanting their husbands to know, and that the term "women's liberation" was considered a "dirty word" at the time.

That year, 1971, she found the Orange County Feminist Repertory Theater, one of the first feminist theaters in the U.S.. The theater served as a unique venue for subjects that weren't being covered by other theaters in the area, specifically related to politics and women's rights. That same year, Abrams wrote "Myth America: How Far Have You Really Come?" which allowed Abrams to express her political and social views, and help raise funds for the NOW chapter with the play's performance. The play's first performance was held in Sacramento at the first California NOW conference.

Abrams and her husband funded the rental payments for the first pro-choice feminist women's health clinic in Orange County, in 1973. The couple, along with other members of NOW and regional churches, were active in fighting against violence towards pro-choice women's clinics. Abrams described their role as defending clinics "from being burned and destroyed, by staying overnight, sleeping in our cars, and securing the doors with our bodies." Abrams, along with five other women, picketed the Orange County Medical Center, demanding women's rights for abortions, after 47 women were denied abortions at the hospital due to a moratorium being placed on the procedure. The moratorium was started after protests by physicians, claiming that they were overworked due to having to perform over 20 abortions a week. The protest was organized by Abrams and the newly founded Orange County NOW chapter. During the protest she carried a sign reading: "If Men Bore Children, Abortion Laws Wouldn't Exist." Three years later the United States Supreme Court legalized abortion with Roe v. Wade.

In 1976, Abrams wrote and performed an original piece about Martha Beall Mitchell, which she performed during the bicentennial during the fifth annual California NOW conference.

=== Educator and other political concerns ===
Abrams used not only her performances as educational tools, but also has taught courses on feminist issues at various regional schools and colleges. She went on to become the "feminist consultant" for the psychology department at Fullerton College in 1975. She also did fundraising, lecturing, and facilitated discussion forums about the Civil Rights Movement, Sino-American relations, the Vietnam War, the Iraq War, the Israeli–Palestinian conflict, Central American politics and American labor rights.

== Later life and legacy ==
In 1996, Abrams was awarded the Veteran Feminists of America Medal of Honor by NOW. As of 1997, Abrams had started a new program for the theater, focusing on local issues in the county and United States, believing that "...there are things that our country has been instrumental in doing that perpetuate the oppression of women all over the world." Abrams was later diagnosed with Alzheimer's disease, and served as a greeter at the local Unitarian church.

Rosalie Abrams died on January 4, 2010, from complications related to Alzheimer's disease.

== Political opinions and beliefs ==
Abrams believed that despite strong efforts to unite women and fight sexism, those efforts "are now being slowly eroded." She supported the passing of the Equal Rights Amendment, which she believed would help women reach not only general equality with men, but equality in the workplace. Abrams also believes that abortion rights are still in need of fighting, stating that, despite the success of Roe v. Wade, "things don't happen in straight lines. The more successful you are, the worse the backlash becomes."
