= Colin Dettmer =

South African cricketer (1958–2010)

Personal information
- Full name: Colin Peter Dettmer
- Born: 26 September 1958; Cape Town, South Africa
- Died: 12 January 2010 (aged 51)
- Source: Cricinfo, 26 April 2020

Colin Dettmer (26 September 1958 – 12 January 2010) was a South African cricketer who played in twenty-one first-class and twelve List A matches between 1991 and 1995. He committed suicide at the age of 51.
