= James D. Robertson =

James D Robertson MBE, D.Litt., RSA, RSW, RGI, PAI
- Born: James Downie Robertson; 2 November 1931; Cowdenbeath, Scotland
- Died: 7 January 2010 (aged 78); Renfrewshire, Scotland
- Education: Glasgow School of Art
- Known for: Painting

James Downie Robertson, MBE (2 November 1931 – 7 January 2010) was a Scottish painter and senior lecturer at the Glasgow School of Art. He played an influential role in the Scottish visual arts scene for nearly five decades.

Robertson was born in Cowdenbeath in 1931, one of twin boys. His family moved to Glasgow at the start of the Second World War and he attended Hillhead High School. He then studied at the Glasgow School of Art (GSA) under the redoubtable David Donaldson and Joan Eardley. Graduating in 1953, Robertson spent some time in Spain but later accepted a teaching post at Keith Grammar School from 1957 to 1958.

He entered the Glasgow School of Art in 1949 on a non-diploma course. In 1955, he was awarded a post-diploma and spent the summer of that year at Hospitalfield. After leaving the Glasgow School of Art he spent 18 months as a non-certified teacher at Keith Grammar school. In 1959 he joined the staff of the Glasgow School of Art initially on a part-time basis, ultimately becoming a Senior Lecturer and temporary Head of Drawing and Painting before his retirement in 1996.

From 1996 to 1998, he held the post of resident painter at the Glasgow School of Art. His work is held many public and private collections including Prince Philip and The Queen Mother.

== Death ==
He died on 7 January 2010 after a short illness

In October 2010 a memorial exhibition was held at the Glasgow Art Club

== Awards ==
- 1962 Elected member of the Royal Scottish Society of Painters in Watercolour (RSW)
- 1971 Cargill Award (RGI)
- 1975 May Marshall Brown Award (RSW)
- 1980 Elected member of the Royal Glasgow Institute of the Fine Arts
- 1981 Sir William Gillies Award (RSW)
- 1982 Cargill Award (RGI)
- 1985 Shell Expo Award
- 1987 Graham Munro Award (RSW)
- 1987 Millersville University award Millersville University of Pennsylvania, USA
- 1989 Elected full member of the Royal Scottish Academy (RSA)
- 1989 Scottish Amicable Award (RSA)
- 1993 Scottish Post Office Award (RSW)
- 1999 RSW Council Award (RSW)
- 2001 Dunfermline Building Society Prize (RSA)
- 2002 Hon D.Litt., University of Glasgow
- 2010 Member of the Order of the British Empire Order of the British Empire
