= Juan Pedro Laporte =

Guatemalan archaeologist

Juan Pedro Laporte Molina (7 August 1945 – 22 January 2010) was a prominent Guatemalan archaeologist best known for his work on the ancient Maya civilization. He studied in the United States at the University of Arizona, in which he enrolled at the age of nineteen. After just one year he transferred to the Escuela Nacional de Antropología e Historia ("National School of Anthropology and History") in Mexico. He continued his studies at the Universidad Autónoma de México from 1972 to 1976, from which he graduated with a doctorate in archaeology. He worked as a research assistant at the Museo Nacional de Antropología in Mexico City from 1967 through to 1976. Laporte worked at various archaeological sites while he was in Mexico, including Tlatilco, Chichen Itza and Dainzú. He first began working as an archaeologist in Guatemala in the 1970s, and was the head of the School of History of the Universidad de San Carlos de Guatemala (USAC) for more than thirty years. He first entered USAC in 1977, soon after returning from Mexico. In 1974 he carried out investigations at the Maya archaeological site of Uaxactun in the northern Petén Department of Guatemala. Between 1974 and 1976 he carried out archaeological investigations in Antigua Guatemala, which has since been designated as a UNESCO World Heritage Site, and around Lake Izabal.

Juan Pedro Laporte died in January 2010 from a lung tumour. An obituary in Guatemala's Siglo Veintiuno newspaper described him as "the father of Guatemalan archaeology". He was one of the founding editors of the Simposio de Investigaciones Arqueológicas en Guatemala ("Symposium of Archaeological Investigations in Guatemala"), which has been published annually since 1987. His books include La organización territorial y política en el mundo Maya Clásico : el caso del sureste y centro-oeste de Petén, Guatemala and Bibliografía de la arqueología guatemalteca.
