= Steve Lovelady =

American journalist (1943–2010)

- Born: Steven Lovelady; July 2, 1943; Morganfield, Kentucky, U.S.
- Died: January 15, 2010 (aged 66); Key West, Florida, U.S.
- Education: University of Missouri
- Occupation: Journalist
- Spouse(s): Linda R. Higgins; Ann
- Children: 2

Steven Lovelady (July 2, 1943 – January 15, 2010) was an American journalist.

== Early life ==
Born in Morganfield, Kentucky, Lovelady was raised in Worland, Wyoming, where he delivered newspapers. He earned his journalism degree from the University of Missouri.

== Career ==
Early in his career, he first worked as a reporter for The Wall Street Journal then ended as an editor of front-page articles, before being hired in 1972 by Gene Roberts to work for The Philadelphia Inquirer, where he spent 23 years as the associate editor then working his way up to managing editor. He joined Time Inc. in 1996 as "editor at large", a title and role created specifically for him by Norman Pearlstine. Lovelady left Time Inc. in 2004 and began working at Campaign Desk, a Columbia Journalism Review Web site.

== Awards ==
- Two Pulitzer prizes for his investigative work for The Inquirer

== Family ==
Lovelady was married to his wife Ann, a former editor of The New York Times. In his first marriage he was married to Linda R. Higgins, and together they had two daughters, Sara and Stephanie, and three grandchildren.

== Death ==
Lovelady died of throat cancer on January 15, 2010, in Key West, Florida, at the age of 66.
