= Vanda Skuratovich =

Belarusian Roman Catholic activist (1925–2010)

- Ванда Скуратовіч
- Born: 1925
- Died: 12 January 2010 (aged 84–85); Minsk, Belarus
- Occupation: Roman Catholic activist
- Awards: Righteous Among the Nations

Vanda Skuratovich (Belarusian: Ванда Скуратовіч, 1925, Raubichy – 12 January 2010, Minsk), also translated as Wanda Skuratowicz was a Belarusian Roman Catholic activist.

== Life ==
Skuratovich was born Vanda Aniszkiewicz in 1925, and grew up on a farm near Dunilavichy. In November 1942, during the Second World War, the Skuratovich family rescued a local Jewish family, the Slawin's during the Nazi occupation of Belarus. To ensure their anonymity, they used Polish names: Sonia and Jeremiah and their children Leo and Basia. The Jewish family, including two children, were hidden under the floor of the home for 18 months without detection. Skuratovich kept in contact with the family when they relocated to Canada and was given a photograph of their descendants (all 64 of them) who she is credited for saving.

After the war, Skuratovich was a staunch activist, organizing religious ceremonies, largely forbidden by Soviet authorities at that time, at her home. She actively participated in the campaign by Belarusian Roman Catholics demanding return of the Kalvaryja Church in Minsk, which was returned to the Catholic Church in 1980.

On 7 April 1994 she was awarded the Righteous Gentile designation from Jerusalem’s Yad Vashem Holocaust Memorial at the Israeli Embassy in Minsk. In 2022, the Garden of the Righteous in Duino at the United World College of the Adriatic was opened in her honour.

Vanda Skuratovich died in Minsk on 12 January 2010, aged 84. A funeral service was held at Church of Holy Trinity, Minsk
