= Elsa Bakalar =

- Born: 08 October 1918; England
- Died: January 30, 2010 (aged 90–91); Northampton, Massachusetts
- Occupation: Garden designer
- Known for: A Garden of One's Own

Elsa Bakalar (born 08 October 1918 – 29 January 2010) was an English-born American garden designer, best known for her 1994 book A Garden of One's Own.

Bakalar's work has been featured in Horticulture Magazine, The Boston Globe, and Newsday, and she has worked with the Harvard University Arnold Arboretum and the New England Wild Flower Society. She was born in England and came to the United States after World War Two. She was employed by the British Information Services ("BIS") and wrote occasional articles for Gourmet Magazine. Starting in the 1950s, she worked for many years as a teacher in New York City at the Ethical Culture Fieldston School, first as a grade school teacher at Midtown (in Manhattan), then at the high school in Riverdale. She retired from teaching in 1977 and moved to Heath, Massachusetts with her husband Michael to devote herself full-time to gardening.

== Published works ==
- Elsa Bakalar, Portrait of a Gardener [video] (OCLC 29672896, Images, 1993)
- A Garden of One's Own (ISBN 0-688-12145-4; Morrow, 1994)
