= Kalthoum Sarrai =

French television presenter

- كلثوم السراي
- Kalthoum Sarrai as the French Super Nanny prior to her death.
- Born: 25 September 1962; Tunis, Tunisia
- Died: 19 January 2010 (aged 47); Paris, France
- Resting place: Le Bardo, Tunisia

Kalthoum Sarrai (Arabic: كلثوم السراي) (25 September 1962 – 19 January 2010), best known as Cathy Sarrai, was a Tunisian-born French television presenter, anchorwoman and television personality. She was known to many French and Belgian television viewers for her role in the French version of Super Nanny, which began airing on M6 on 1 February 2005.

Sarrai was born in Tunis, Tunisia, on 25 September 1962, as one of seven children. She moved to France in 1979, where she studied child psychology before pursuing a successful career as a television presenter. Sarrai also authored three books, including an autobiography.

She began appearing on the French version of Super Nanny in 2005. The show, in which she taught parents basic child care and parenting techniques, attracted 3.7 million viewers in Belgium and France, making her a familiar personality on M6.

Kalthoum Sarrai died in Paris on Tuesday 19 January 2010, of cancer at the age of 47. She was buried in Le Bardo, Tunisia.
