= Casualties of the 2010 Haiti earthquake =

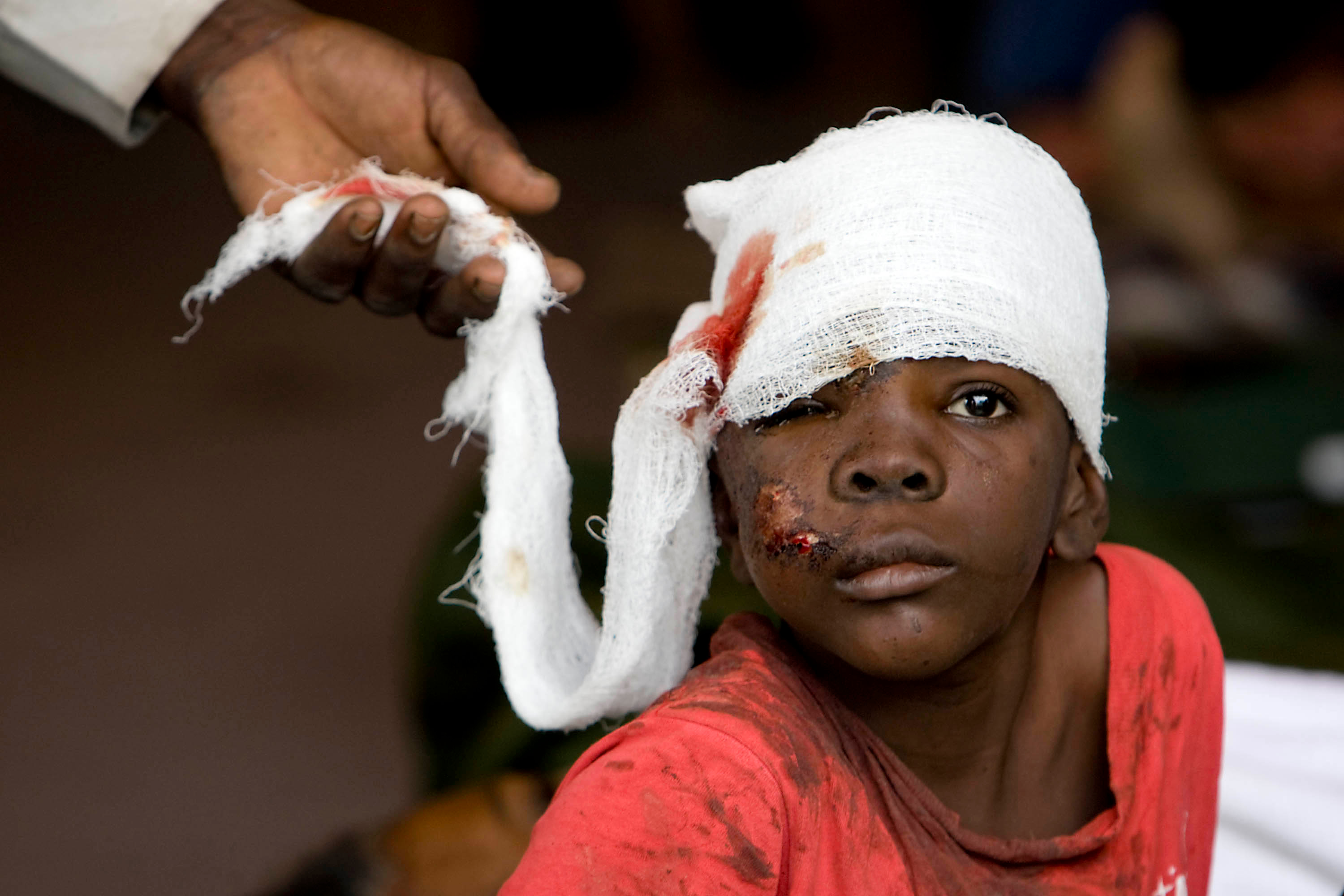
A Haitian boy receives treatment at an MINUSTAH's logistics base

On January 12, 2010, a massive earthquake struck the country of Haiti, leaving behind a trail of destruction that shocked the entire world. The earthquake had a magnitude of 7.0, making it one of the most powerful and deadliest earthquakes ever recorded in that region.

The disaster hit close to Port-au-Prince, the capital city of Haiti, where millions of people lived. Within seconds, buildings collapsed, homes were destroyed, and entire neighborhoods were wiped out. Hospitals, schools, and government buildings all crumbled to the ground, leaving survivors with nowhere to turn for help. The loss of life was devastating. Hundreds of thousands of people were killed, and many more were left injured, trapped under rubble, or homeless. Families were torn apart, and the streets were filled with people desperately searching for their loved ones. The 2010 Haiti earthquake was not just a natural disaster, it was a humanitarian crisis that exposed how vulnerable Haiti was due to poverty and poor building structures. The world came together to respond, but the scale of the damage made recovery incredibly difficult and slow.

On 21 February, Preval raised that estimate to 300,000. In February, prime minister Jean-Max Bellerive estimated that 300,000 had been injured. Speaking in Miami in June 2010, Bellerive also estimated the number of deaths had been 300,000. On the first anniversary of the quake, Bellerive raised the death toll to 316,000. He said that was, in part, because of the recovery of additional bodies. A University of Michigan study in 2010 estimated about 160,000 deaths.

== Background ==
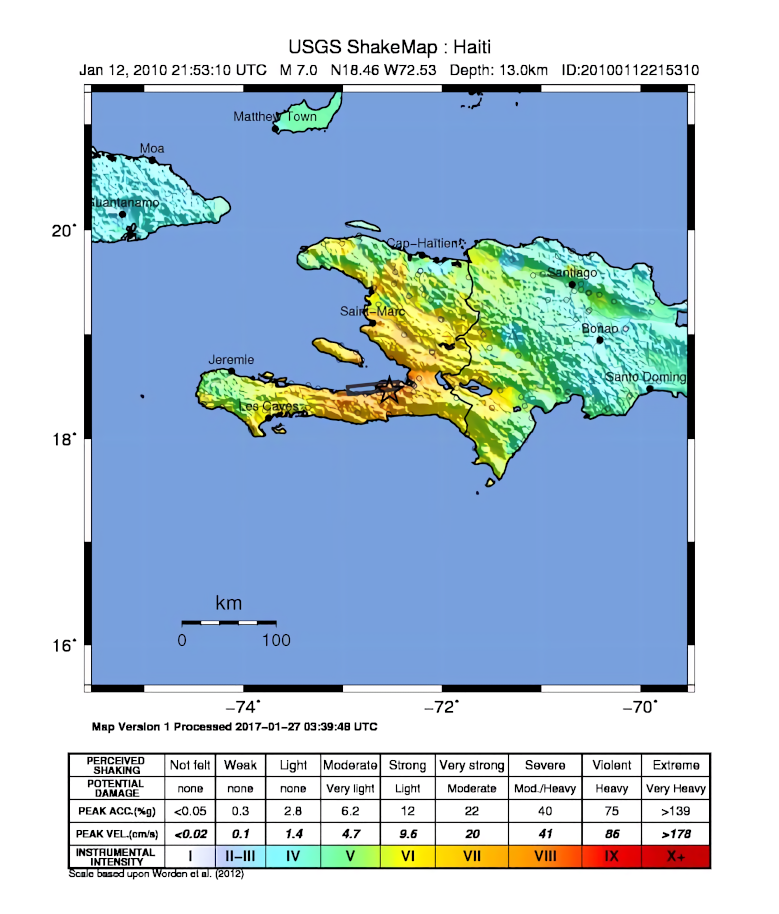
USGS intensity map

The earthquake occurred on 12 January 2010 approximately 25 kilometres (16 mi) WSW from the country's capital Port-au-Prince at 16:53 UTC-5 on the Enriquillo-Plantain Garden fault system. The earthquake was measured a magnitude of 7.0 M_{w} earthquake and was followed by a series of aftershocks, fourteen of them between magnitudes 5.0 and 5.9. The main area affected by the quake was Port-au-Prince and the surrounding region, although it was also felt in several surrounding countries and regions including Cuba, Jamaica, Puerto Rico, and the neighbouring country of Dominican Republic. No casualties were reported outside of Haiti.

Much of Port-au-Prince's infrastructure was significantly damaged or destroyed in the earthquake, including the Presidential Palace, the National Assembly building, the Port-au-Prince Cathedral, hospitals, schools and the main prison. All hospitals were destroyed or so badly damaged that they were abandoned. In addition, the facilities of foreign governments and non-government organizations were badly damaged in the quake, including the headquarters of the United Nations Stabilisation Mission in Haiti (MINUSTAH), which was destroyed.

== Calculating casualties ==
Calculating the exact number of casualties in the earthquake is an "impossible" task due to the mass number of victims and a lack of a centralized system for tabulating casualties. In the weeks following the earthquake there were a number of estimate figures, ranging from the low tens of thousands to the hundreds of thousands. On 12 January, Haitian prime minister Jean-Max Bellerive stated that the death toll could be "well over 100,000". On 15 January, the Red Cross stated that 40,000–50,000 may have died, while Haitian interior minister Paul Antoine Bien-Aimé estimated that the dead were between 100,000 and 200,000. On 17 January, Bien-Aimé stated that there were "around 50,000 dead bodies" and "there will be between 100,000 and 200,000 dead in total, although we will never know the exact number." Prime Minister Bellerive then announced that over 70,000 bodies have been buried in mass graves. Several days after the quake Haitian authorities estimated the number of injured at 250,000. According to Belgian disaster emergency medicine expert Claude de Ville de Goyet "round numbers are a sure sign that nobody knows." Haitian president René Préval reported on 27 January that "nearly 170,000" bodies had been counted.

On 10 February the Haitian government reported the death toll to have reached 230,000. However, an investigation by Radio Netherlands has questioned the official death toll, reporting an estimate of 92,000 deaths as being a more realistic figure. Other officials did not even attempt to provide a casualty estimate. Edmond Mulet, who was appointed head of the United Nations after the quake, stated that "I don’t think we will ever know what the death toll is from this earthquake." And the director of the Haitian Red Cross, Guiteau Jean-Pierre, noted that his organization didn't "have time to count" bodies, as they were too busy trying to treat survivors.

The complications of coming up with an accurate casualty count were revealed in an interview by The New York Times reporters with the employees at the mortuary in the largest hospital in Port-au-Prince. In the interview, Alix Lassegue, the head physician at the morgue, provided a rough estimate of the number of bodies that had been passed through the mortuary by tabulating the square yardage of the area where bodies had been placed and the space that each body occupied times the number of times bodies were removed from the grounds. Lassegue's estimate was an even 10,000. Other employees estimated the number of bodies that had passed through the morgue as 75,000, 50,000 and 25,000. Compounding the problem of calculating casualties was that people were burying the dead in informal graves and many bodies had been thrown into dumps outside the city. In addition, thousands of people were leaving areas affected by the earthquake, without any centralized method of tabulating who had left. The most reliable academic estimate of the number of earthquake casualties in Haiti (over 95% were in the immediate Port-au-Prince area) "within six weeks of the earthquake" appears to be the 160,000 estimate in a 2010 University of Michigan study.

An alternative method that may be used to tabulate casualties is by using the satellite imagery of Port-au-Prince located on Google Maps so that destroyed buildings can be catalogued and an estimate of casualties can be calculated using data on the inhabitants. But this method is complicated by the fact that such data may be inaccurate and infectious diseases, such as dysentery, malaria and dengue fever, could take their toll on survivors.

A statistical study by a specialist group at the Children's Hospital Los Angeles and the University of Southern California estimated that the number of children injured was 110,000, or roughly half the total number of injuries.

There were reports of more precise numbers of casualties for certain areas of the country. On 18 January, Agency for Technical Cooperation and Development (ACTED) reported that 145 had died and 380 were wounded in Jacmel, the country's fourth largest city located in the south of Haiti. Some other local communal leaders were attempting to count the number of dead in their community. The New York Times reported that in the Edmond Paul region in southern Port-au-Prince, lawyer and community leader Isaac Jean Widner was organizing a list of the dead. Widner estimated that of the 3,000 people that had lived in his neighborhood before the quake, 1,000 had died, but he added that "between the exodus and those still trapped it was impossible to confirm."

== Response and treatment of casualties ==
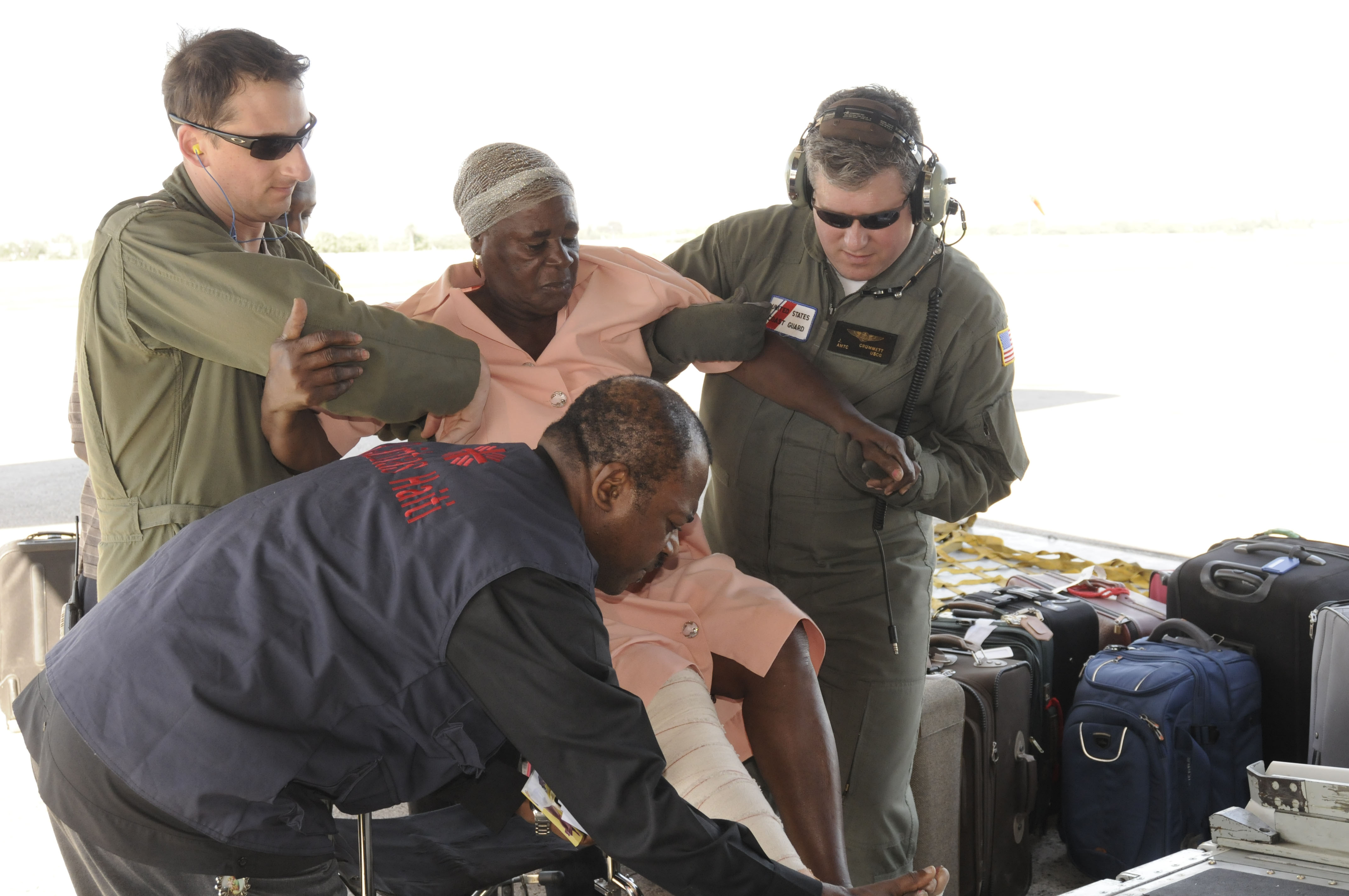
US Coast Guard personnel carry an injured woman onto the loading ramp of an HC-130 Hercules aircraft, 14 January 2010, before departing for the Dominican Republic.

The earthquake struck in the most populated area of the country and the International Red Cross estimated that as many as 3 million people have been affected by the quake, including injuries and deaths. One factor that contributed to the number casualties in the aftermath of the earthquake was a lack of medical supplies, damage to hospitals, and a shortage of medical and rescue personnel. In addition, Haitian and foreign medical staff, police, and military personnel themselves became victims of the earthquake. An example of this was Port-au-Prince's Grace Children's Hospital, where it was reported on 19 January that of 120 employees, only six had been accounted for and some had been confirmed killed.

Soon after the quake struck appeals for international aid were issued by Haitian government officials, including Raymond Joseph, Haiti's ambassador to the United States. Neighboring Dominican Republic was one of the first countries to give aid to Haiti. And the non-governmental organization Giving Children Hope distributed much-needed medicines and supplies. International organization also began large-scale fund raising campaigns for aid to Haiti, including campaigns by the International Red Cross and relief charities in Britain.

On 25 January Handicap International published a statement that an estimated 1,000 amputations had taken place due to injuries. In response to the quake the organization dispatched 30 rehabilitation and health staff to Haiti and announced that they would eventually increase staff numbers to 100 and provide hundreds of prostheses.

In addition, the government of the United States issued orders for deployment to the United States Army's 1st Battalion, 73rd Infantry from Fort Bragg, North Carolina, which is scheduled to deploy along with the aircraft carrier USS Carl Vinson. The U.S. Navy also announced on 13 January 2010 that the hospital ship Comfort and amphibious helicopter carrier Bataan will be deployed to assist in the humanitarian relief efforts. The American government also announced that it would provide $100 million for the aid effort in Haiti. Partners in Health, the largest health care provider in rural Haiti, also provided aid from Port-au-Prince. Despite the domestic and international relief efforts, many Haitians in the initial days after the earthquake did not have access to health care.

Those injured in the quake, including both Haitians and foreign, have been treated in hospitals abroad. Many patients were transferred to hospitals in neighboring Dominican Republic, including to hospitals in the capital Santo Domingo and in the border towns of Neiba and Jimaní. The total number of casualties treated in the Dominican Republic reached into the hundreds and on 20 January the Dominican Republican government announced that 600 patients would be repatriated to Haiti. Some casualties were brought to the United States, including nearly 500 patients who were transported to Florida and treated in hospitals across the state, including University of Miami's Jackson Memorial Hospital.

Burial of the dead was one of the most serious concerns in the aftermath of the earthquake as the main cemetery in Port-au-Prince announced that its plots were full and it was not accepting any more bodies. The Haitian law that bodies must be prepared by a funeral parlor before burial was suspended within the first day of the earthquake. The government then turned to burying the dead in mass graves, including a number of plots in the fields around Titanyen, located north of the capital. Members of the International Committee of the Red Cross encouraged Haitian authorities to take measures so that the bodies could later be identified, including filling out standard forms on bodies; photographing clothing, jewelry, and special marks on the body; and noting where the body was found and where it was buried.

Religious leader, including both Roman Catholic and Vodou priests, also objected to the mass burials. Max Beauvoir, the head of Haiti's main Voodoo priests' organization called the mass burials "degrading", "indecent" and "inhuman", due to the fact that in Voodoo the regular maintenance of the tomb and visitation of gravesites by descendants is highly important. There were also confirmed reports of uncollected bodies being burned in the streets.

== Individuals ==
The vast majority of those injured and killed in the earthquake were Haitian. Haitian casualties came from all sectors of society, from common citizens to prominent leaders and entertainers. Victims include public figures such as Port-au-Prince Archbishop Joseph Serge Miot and the vicar general, Msgr. Charles Benoit, who were killed in the destruction of the Port-au-Prince Cathedral. A number of individuals with connections to the government were killed: Hubert Deronceray, a former Minister of Education and Minister of Social Services and a three-time candidate for president, and opposition leader Micha Gaillard. An early report also listed Justice Minister Paul Denis as one of the victims but Denis was in fact able to escape the ministry's collapsing building in time.

Among the academics killed were topographer Gina Porcena and creolist Pierre Vernet. Prominent Women's movement activists were killed, including Magalie Marcelin, who founded the organization Kay Fanm to help shelter victims of rape and violence; Myriam Merlet, who was currently working for Haiti's Ministry for Gender and the Rights of Women; Anne-Marie Coriolan, who founded the organization Solidarite Fanm Ayisyen (Solidarity with Haitian Women); and Myrna Narcisse, Director General of the Ministry of Women's Condition. The Haitian music industry experienced extensive losses in the quake. The dead included Joubert Charles, the most prominent promoter of music in Port-au-Prince; rapper Jimmy O. and rapper Evenson "Shacan Lord" Francis of the group Gasoline Clan. The music groups Djakout Mizik, Kreyol La, Nu Look, Krezy Mizik, Mika Ben, Mizik Mizik, and Carimi all reported missing members.

A Haitian press association also reported that more than a dozen journalists had been killed. Among these were Wanel Fils, a reporter with Radio Galaxie; Henry Claude Pierre, a Jacmel-based correspondent for Radio Magic 9; and Belot Senatus, a cameraman for Radio Tele Guinen. Jean Robert François, a reporter with Radio Magic 9, was seriously wounded.

The Caribbean Football Union reported that at least 30 people with ties to Fédération Haïtienne de Football were killed, including players, coaches, referees, and administrative and medical representatives. Among those killed were Alix Avin, head coach of the senior men's team; Gerard Cineus former Haiti national football team coach; Antoine Craan, one of the first black professional soccer players in Canada and a longtime Quebec soccer official. and Jean Yves Labaze, who coached Haiti to the FIFA U-17 World Cup in 2007 and coached the national women's team. Some 20 others with ties to Haitian football were feared buried in the ruins. The families of numerous famous Haitians were casualties in the quake, including the family of WBC welterweight champion Andre Berto, who withdrew from a 30 January boxing match after learning of the death of relatives.

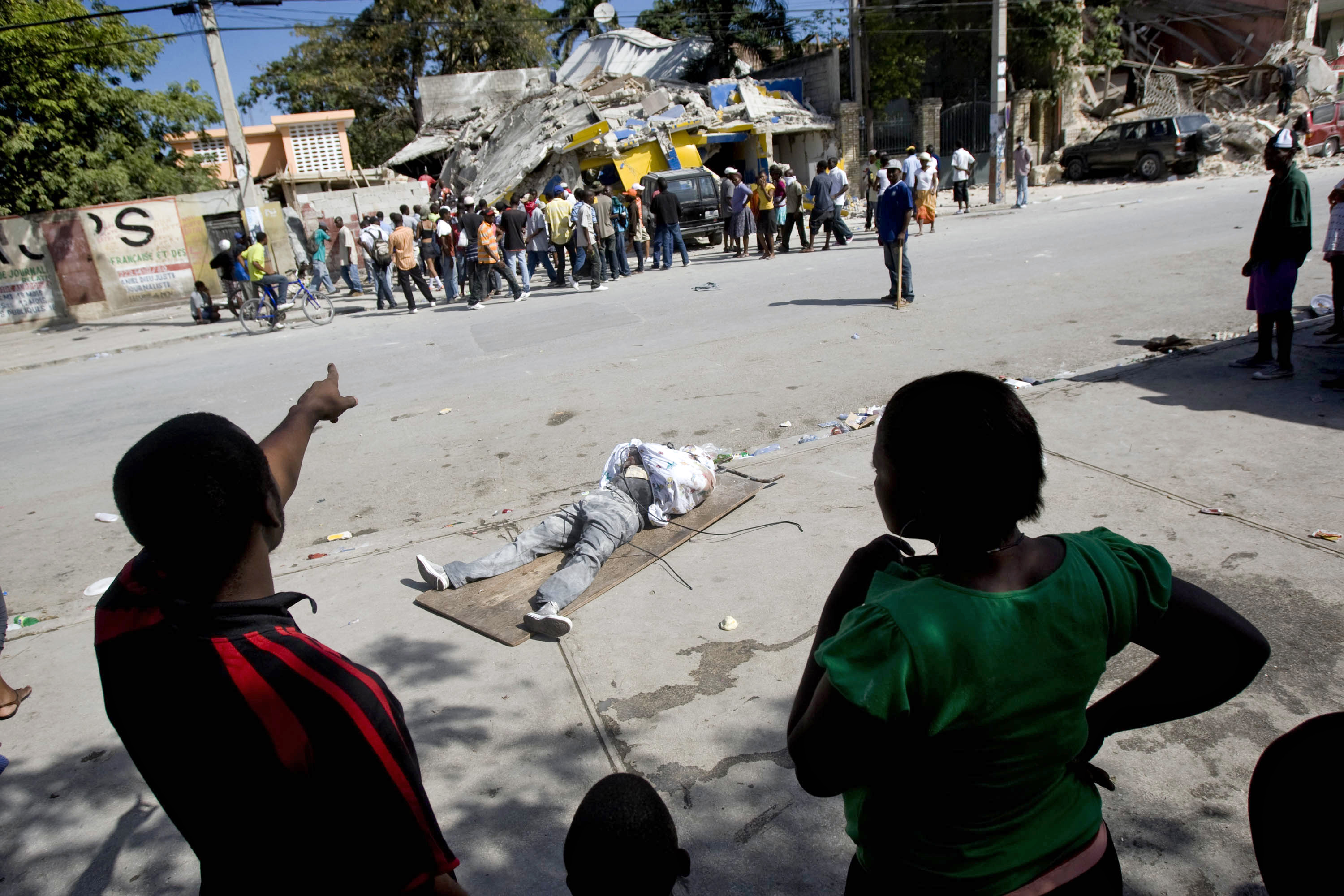
Haitians look at a body pulled out from the rubble of a school that collapsed after the earthquake that rocked Port-au-Prince on 12 January.

Various Catholic religious institutes reported the deaths and injury of dozens of clergy members and the destruction and damage of churches, religious schools and offices. Among the more seriously affected was the Salesian religious institute, which stated that as many as 500 students and staff were killed in the collapse of the buildings and schools operated by the institute in Haiti. Those killed included Brother Hubert Sanon, the first Haitian Salesian, and 250 schoolchildren and some 200 young women studying in the schools. Protestant groups also reported casualties, the US-based Southern Baptist International Mission Board, which announced the death of Bienne Lamerique, pastor of the Siloam Baptist Church in Port-au-Prince.

Foreign-based companies doing business in Haiti also suffered casualties. Trilogy International Partners, which provides mobile phone service in Haiti through its subsidiary Comcel Haiti and is one of the largest foreign investors in the country, announced that 5 of its 575 employees had died and 35 remained missing. U.S.-based Citigroup Inc. announced that the bank's headquarters in Haiti had been destroyed, killing and injuring some employees. And Oxfam reported that a business manager named Amedee Marescot was injured in the collapse of the Oxfam office and later died in hospital.

Universities and religious institutions also reported the losses. The University of Virginia stated that graduate student Pierrette Stephanie Jean-Charles was killed while at home with her family. The First Church of Christ in Longmeadow, Massachusetts reported that at least thirty nursing students were killed in the destruction of the CONASPEH School, which the church had been assisting.

The fates of some civilian Haitians received the attention of international media. Both The Washington Post and U.S.-based National Public Radio reported on the story of a nine-year-old girl named Haryssa, who died beneath the remains of her home before rescuers could reach her. As had CNN with the story of Anaika St. Louis, who was pulled from the rubble of her home in an hours long rescue effort, but died after her family was told at a hospital that they could not care for her. But many Haitian casualties went completely unrecorded. Agence France-Presse reported that in the initial days of the earthquake corpses remained unburied in the streets across the capital and the majority of bodies at the city morgue remained unidentified and unclaimed. At least two mass graves had been dug in Port-au-Prince for interment of the dead. Other bodies were often buried by family members in informal graves. The lack of a centralized system for tabulating casualties means that the exact number of dead and injured is unknown.

The looting and violence that occurred in the wake of the quake also led to casualties, including fifteen-year-old Fabienne Cherisma, who was killed on Marthely Seiee Street in Port-au-Prince when police fired shots to disperse looters. Others identified as looters or thieves were killed by vigilantes.

== United Nations casualties ==
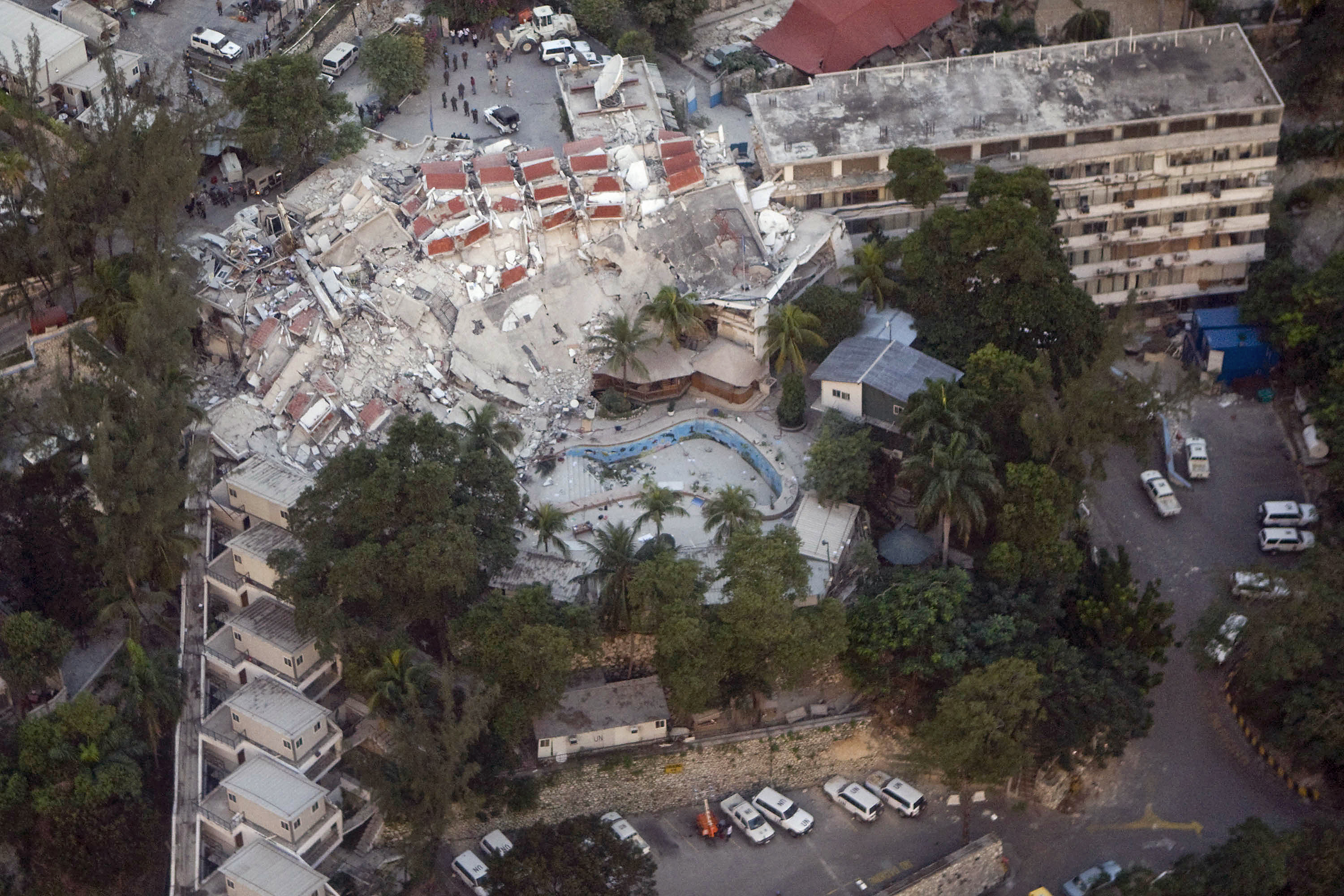
Hotel Christopher, which served as the UN headquarters, after the earthquake

The UN headquarters hosting the stabilization mission for Haiti (MINUSTAH), at the Christopher Hotel in Port-au-Prince, suffered a devastating collapse, concentrating early UN rescue efforts on their own personnel. Most of MINUSTAH's 9,000 troops and police were located elsewhere. Many U.N. personnel trapped in the building died, including mission head Hédi Annabi and deputy head of the UN mission in Haiti, Luiz Carlos da Costa UN Secretary-General Ban Ki-moon has confirmed that 83 UN staff members had died and 32 remained missing.

- Argentina: Gustavo Ariel Gómez, 33, a gendarme from Buenos Aires, was fatally wounded in the earthquake. Days after the quake he died in a hospital in Jimaní in the Dominican Republic. Gómez was one of the 600-member Argentine peacekeeping force, which operated an infantry battalion, a field hospital and 2 helicopters.
- Benin: Three Beninese were confirmed to have died, including police officers Kura Batipi and Okoro Afiss and Constable S. Imorou Salifou.
- Brazil: Brazil had the largest contingent of UN personnel in Haiti, totaling more than 1,200. In addition to the death of deputy head of the UN mission in Haiti, Luiz Carlos da Costa, eighteen Brazilian military personnel were killed and 25 were injured. A number of the dead were officers, including Coronel Emílio Carlos Torres dos Santos, Coronel João Eliseu Souza Zanin, Lieutenant-Coronel Marcus Vinicius Macedo Cysneiros, Major Francisco Adolfo Vianna Martins Filho, Major Márcio Guimarães Martins, Lieutenant Bruno Ribeiro Mário, and Sub-Lieutenant Raniel Batista de Camargos. Enlisted deaths included Private Antônio José Anacleto, Corporal Arí Dirceu Fernandes Júnior, Sergent Davi Ramos de Lima, Corporal Douglas Pedrotti Neckel, Private Felipe Gonçalves Julio, Private Kleber da Silva Santos, Second Sergeant Leonardo de Castro Carvalho, Private Rodrigo Augusto da Silva, Third Sergeant Rodrigo de Souza Lima, Private Tiago Anaya Detimermani, Corporal Washington Luis de Souza Seraphin.
- Canada:Two Royal Canadian Mounted Police officers of the international training cadre have been confirmed dead, Supt. Doug Coates, the acting commissioner of MINUSTAH, and Sgt. Mark Gallagher are confirmed to have been killed. Canada has an 82-member peacekeeping police force in Haiti. All 42 members of the SPVM, 23 members of the SQ and the five members of the Canadian Forces deployed to Haiti with MINUSTAH have been accounted for, as safe. Guillaume Siemienski and Hélène Rivard of the Canadian International Development Agency were also killed. Siemienski was working as a Political Affairs Officer for the UN. Other casualties include Renée Carrier, Alexandra Duguay, and Philippe Rouzier. Rouzier was a former professor at Université Laval who was working with the UN as an economist.
- Chad: One Chadian police officer was killed as a result of the quake.
- Chile: The United Nations confirmed the death of Human Rights Officer Andrea Loi.
- People's Republic of China: Eight Chinese police officers were killed when they were in the UN headquarters as the earthquake struck, which destroyed the building and trapped their bodies for days afterwards. A Chinese rescue team could only recover the bodies four days after the earthquake struck, due to the difficulties that the heavy debris was causing. Four of the eight were sent by the Ministry of Public Security, while the other four were peacekeepers who were stationed with 138 other Chinese peacekeepers. The ministry officials who died were: Zhu Xiaoping, director of the ministry's equipment and finance department; Guo Baoshan, deputy director of the ministry's international cooperation department; Wang Shulin and Li Xiaoming, both researchers at the ministry. The four peacekeepers who died were: Zhao Huayu, Li Qin, Zhong Jianqin, and He Zhihong. It is believed that the eight officers were meeting with Hédi Annabi, whose body was also discovered by the Chinese rescue team, at the time of the earthquake.
- Congo: The United Nations confirmed the death of Audit Assistant Watanga Lwango
- France: The United Nations confirmed the deaths of Chief Electoral Assistance Section Marc Plum and personal assistant to the principal deputy special representative of the Secretary General Simone Rita Trudo.
- Guatemala: The United Nations confirmed the death of secretary Mirna Patricia Rodas Arreola Guatemala.
- Haiti: The United Nations confirmed the death of Haitian nationals Hebert Moisse (driver) and Mesonne Antoine (security guard)
- India: The United Nations confirmed the death of IT Technician/International Contractor Satnam Singh, who had immigrated to Canada.
- Ireland: The Department of Foreign Affairs confirmed on 19 January 2010 that the body of 44-year-old father of three Andrew Grene had been recovered from the wreckage of Haiti's destroyed UN building. Andrew Grene, who held dual citizenship in United States and Ireland, was the son of noted University of Chicago professor of classics David Grene and his twin brother Gregory Grene is a member of the music band The Prodigals.
- Italy: The United Nations confirmed the death of Political Affairs Officer Guido Galli.
- Jordan: Three Jordanian police officers were killed and 21 soldiers and policemen were injured. Among the Jordanian casualties were majors Atta Issa Hussein and Ashraf Ali Jayoussi and corporal Raed Faraj Kal-Khawaldeh.
- Kenya: Nivah Odwori was a citizen of Kenya and a resident of the state of New Jersey in the United States. She was one of seven Kenyan United Nations Volunteers in Haiti offering humanitarian assistance to families in Port-au-Prince and working on a program to develop the country's electoral system.
- Mexico: María Antonieta Castillo Santamaría, aged 53, who had spent four years in Haiti working with the United Nations mission, was confirmed killed.
- Niger: Security Officer Karimou Ide was killed.
- Nigeria: Ms. Dede Yebovi Fadairo, an Associate Report Writing Officer with the UN Stabilisation Mission, died in the earthquake. She was among the 121 Nigerians serving with (MINUSTAH) at the time of the earthquake.
- Peru: Luis Eduardo Chanllio Quispe, who worked in an office of the United Nations in Haiti, was killed when a wall collapsed while he was attempting to rescue others.
- Philippines: Pearly Panangui and Jerome Yap were confirmed dead in the collapse of the Hotel Christopher, and two others, Janice Arocena and Eustacio Bermudez, were still missing in the hotel. Also, Grace Fabian and Geraldine Calican remain trapped in the collapsed Caribbean Supermarket.
- Poland: One Polish UN worker was confirmed to have been killed in the earthquake.
- Tunisia: MINUSTAH head of mission Hédi Annabi was killed in the collapse of UN HQ at the Christopher Hotel.
- United Kingdom: Two British, Ann Barnes, personal assistant to the UN Police Commissioner; and Frederick Wooldridge, a dual Australian-British national and senior political affairs and planning officer at the UN, were killed in the collapse of the UN headquarters.
- United States: Lisa Mbele-Mbong, who was born to an American mother and Cameroonian father and grew up in the United States and Europe, died at the U.N. headquarters when a large slab of concrete struck her head. The United Nations also confirmed the death of Board of Inquiry Officer Ericka Chambers Norman.
- Uruguay: Lieutenant Colonel Gonzalo Martirené was in the United Nations headquarters at the time of the earthquake, his body was found on 17 January.

== Foreign casualties ==
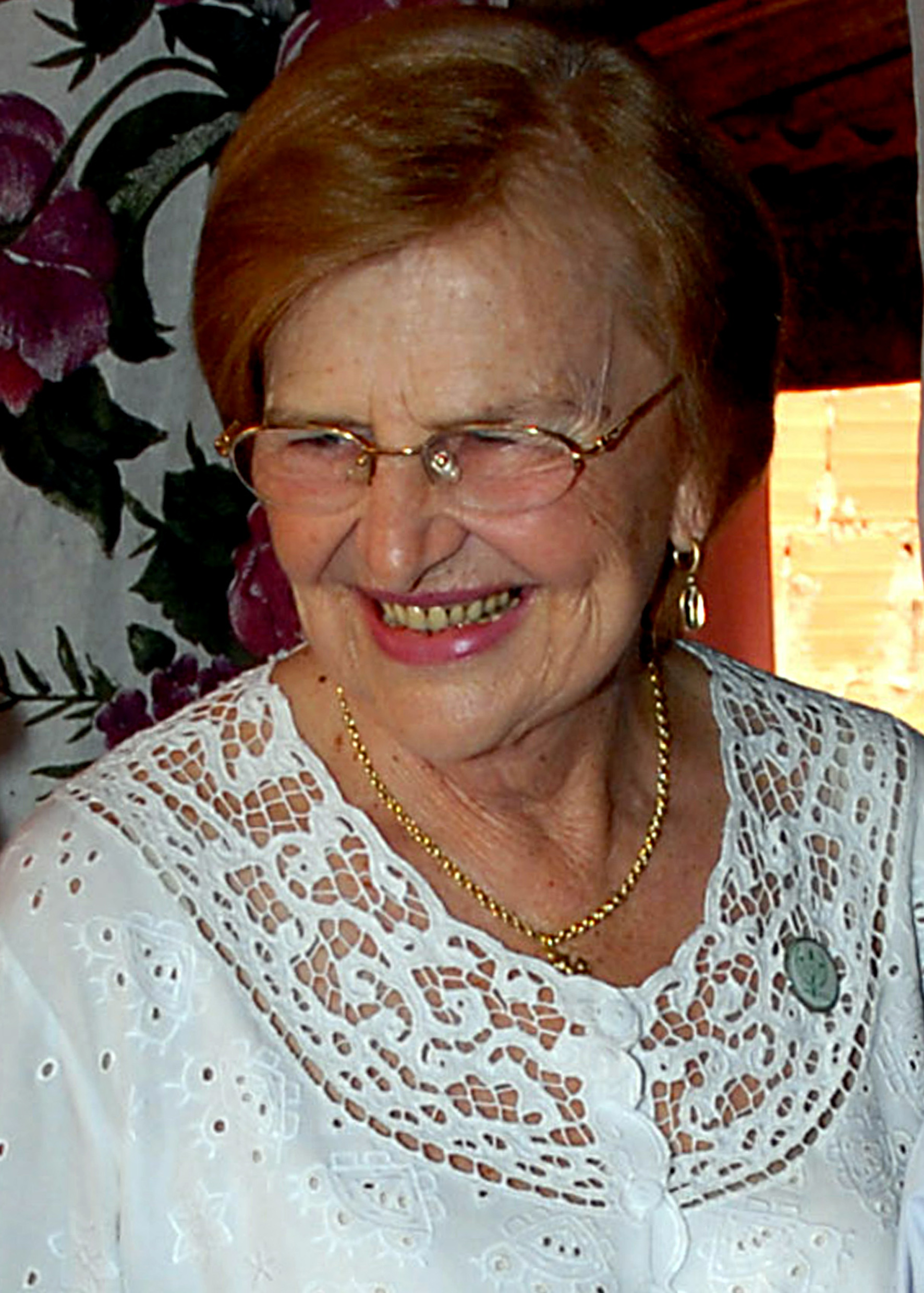
Zilda Arns was killed in the earthquake.

At the time of the earthquake there were a large number of foreigners in Haiti, including non-governmental workers, businessmen, Christian missionaries, and foreign passport holders of Haitian descent. The largest number of foreigners in Haiti was from neighboring countries, including an estimated 40,000–45,000 American citizens, 6,000 Canadians, and 1,200 French. An official of the Dominican Republic reported that there were 2,600 Dominicans living in Haiti as "legal residents." Foreign casualties included government workers, employees of international companies, religious missionaries, and aid workers. Jamaica-based Digicel announced that two of their 900 employees were killed in the quake.

- Austria: 1 killed. Austrian citizen Waltraud Dominique, who was working in Haiti with the German Development Service, died when a wall fell on her.
- Belgium: 1 killed, 33 missing. On 19 January, the Flemish newspaper De Standaard reported that the body of Philippe Dewez, a Belgian citizen working as a consular for president Préval, was found in remains of the collapsed building of the United Nations. 33 other Belgians present in the region have yet to be located.
- Brazil: 1 killed. Pediatrician, relief worker and Nobel Peace Prize nominee Zilda Arns, from the organization Pastoral da Criança, was killed in the quake.
- Canada: 58 killed. About 6,000 Canadians were in Haiti at the time of the earthquake. As of 8 February, there were 27 confirmed deaths while 75 Canadians were still unaccounted for. 4,000 had been evacuated on returning aid flights. Georges Anglade, a Montreal university professor for 30 years, and his wife, Mireille; Denis Bellavance, a professor from Drummondville, Quebec, The Drummondville resident had been lecturing at Port-au-Prince University when he was buried in the rubble; Montreal native Guillaume Siemienski, an employee working with the Canadian International Development Agency; Hélène Rivard, a CIDA consultant; Yvonne Martin of Elmira, Ontario, a missionary with the Evangelical Missionary Church of Canada, died when her guesthouse in Port-au-Prince collapsed, 90 minutes after she arrived in Haiti; and Louise Martin and Roseline Plouffe, both from Quebec, died in the coastal town of Grand-Goâve. Serge Marcil, a former Member of Parliament and Member of the National Assembly of Quebec, Katherine Hadley, an environmental engineer from Ottawa, and Anne Chabot, a civil servant from Montreal who worked for the Quebec government, died in the collapse of Hôtel Montana. Frederick Jean-Michel of Laval, Quebec died while on holiday in Haiti with his wife. Denis Bellevance was a computer science teacher from Drummondville, Quebec in Haiti to give a lecture at Port-au-Prince University. And Dominick Boisrond of Montreal died when the house she was staying in collapsed. Approximately 699 Canadians are still missing, as of 19 January, A number of other Canadians remain trapped under the rubble of the Hôtel Montana, including Alexandre Bitton, Claude Chamberland, Roger Gosselin, Anne Labelle, Richard Proteau, and Paquerette Tremblay. Trần Triệu Quân, the current president of the International Taekwon-Do Federation, whose arrest in the 1990s in his native Vietnam elicited a national campaign to gain his freedom, was confirmed dead on 12 February.
- Chile: 2 killed, 4 missing. María Teresa Dowling was visiting her husband, general Ricardo Toro, deputy chief of MINUSTAH's military component, when her hotel collapsed. Her body was found in the morning of 22 January and recognized by her husband, although it could not be recovered yet. A Human Rights attorney working for United Nations, Andrea Loi, was found dead under the collapsed building of MINUSTAH. The other four men are still missing.
- Colombia: 1 Killed. Sandra Liliana Rivera Gonzalez working for Delta Air Lines was killed and found under the four star Hotel Montana, her body was repatriated back to Colombia.
- Dominican Republic: 24 killed, 10 missing the Associated Press reported on 19 January that 24 Dominicans had been killed and 24 injured in the earthquake. At least four Dominican engineers, José Rafael Medina and Guillermo Peña Capellán, Luis Bolivar and Manuel Lora who worked for the firm Muñoz Mera y Fondeur died after an office building collapsed. One Dominican citizen working for the Dominican embassy was also killed. Another ten Dominicans are reported as missing. They were working on the Port-au-Prince/Mirebalais highway.
- France: 27 killed, 6 missing including Emmanuel Sanson-Rejouis and his two daughters, who were killed in the collapse of the Karibe Hotel.
- Germany: 2 killed. Twenty-eight-year-old Christoph Mark Rouven Redeker Kopp died when the roof of the Hôtel Montana collapsed and the 26-year-old Olivia-Elisa Bouillé died in her hotel room.
- Italy: 1 killed. Gigliola Martino, a seventy-year-old resident of Port-au-Prince, died in the quake.
- Mexico: 1 killed. Kareen Valero Jacques, a language teacher who went to Port-au-Prince to visit her Haitian boyfriend, died in the earthquake. The Mexican government reported that more than 130 Mexican citizens were in the country at the time of the earthquake.
- Netherlands: 4 killed, 18 missing. Four Dutch citizens who stayed in hotel Villa Thereza in Haïti to adopt a child, have been killed during the quake. The three adopted children were killed as well. One child with a Dutch residence permit died as well. 18 other Dutch citizens are still missing.
- Philippines: Geraldine Lalican was reported trapped underneath a collapsed supermarket.
- Russia: 1 killed. A Russian professor of Physics and Mathematics, Nikolay Sukhomlin, died in the quake. Sukhomlin was a faculty member at Universidad Autónoma de Santo Domingo in the Dominican Republic.

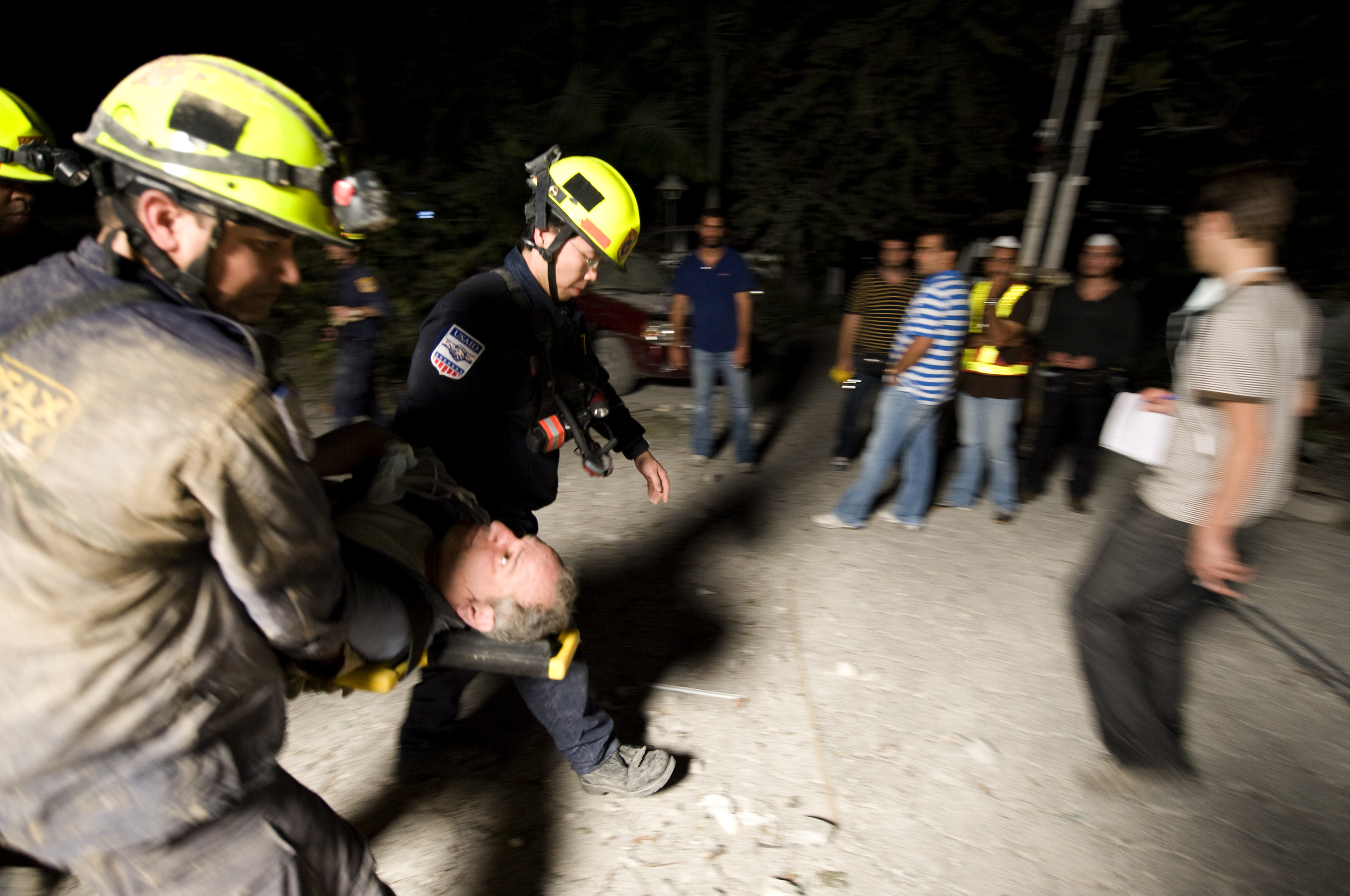
Relief workers carry an American national from Montana Hotel rubble 15 January 2010

- Spain: 3 killed. A Spanish couple, María Jesús Plaza and Yves Batroni, were confirmed dead by the Spanish Minister of Foreign Affairs on 15 January 2010. On 19 January the body of policewoman Rosa Crespo was found; Crespo, aged 47, was working as a security escort for a UN delegate who was also killed in the earthquake. As of 19 January 99 of the officially 111 registered Spaniards in Haiti had been contacted or found (including the three deceased).
- Syria: 2 killed The Syrian ambassador to Lebanon Ali Abdel-Karim Ali announced that two Syrian citizens, a couple, were killed in Haiti.
- Taiwan: 1 killed. A Taiwanese woman was killed when the house she was in collapsed. She was the daughter of an engineer working for a Taiwanese government-invested company that built roads and bridges.
- United States: 104 killed. The U.S. State Department has confirmed 104 American deaths, including at least four people directly affiliated with the U.S. government. An estimated 45,000 Americans were in Haiti at the time of the quake. As of 8 March, 2,000 were unaccounted for. Determining the exact number of Americans and people with dual US-Haitian citizenship presents difficulties because dual citizens do not routinely register with the US Embassy. American casualties came from a variety of backgrounds and include government officials, humanitarian workers, Christian missionaries, and expatriates living in Haiti. One victim was Victoria DeLong, a cultural affairs officer with the State Department, who was killed when her house collapsed. Celebrated former soccer player Gerald Haig died when the roof of his home collapsed, which also severely injured his wife. Many American victims had ties to non-profit organizations in Haiti. Molly Hightower of Port Orchard, Washington was killed when the orphanage she was working in was destroyed. Flo McGarrell, a transgender visual artist from Vermont, died in the collapse of the Peace of Mind Hotel in Jacmel, where he worked in a non-profit art center. Ryan Kloos of Phoenix, Arizona died in Pétion-Ville while visiting his sister, who worked in a local orphanage. A 4-year-old orphan named Atanie, who was in the process of being adopted by Lorie and Darrell Johnson of Knoxville, Tennessee, died when the roof of her orphanage, located outside of Port-au-Prince, collapsed. A number of Americans conducting missionary work died in the earthquake. Rev. Sam Dixon, Deputy General Secretary of the United Methodist Committee on Relief, and Rev. Clinton Rabb, head of the mission volunteers office of the United Methodist General Board of Global Ministries, were killed in the collapse of Hôtel Montana. Three members of the Free Methodist Church, Rev. Jeanne Acheson-Munos, Merle West and Gene Dufour, died together in the collapse of the Friends of Haiti Organization headquarters. Ben Larson, a senior student at Wartburg Theological Seminary, was in Haiti with his wife and cousin conducting missionary work was killed in the earthquake. Clara Jean Arnwine was one of 12 members of the Highland Park United Methodist Church who had gone to run a free eye clinic in Petit-Goâve. Arnwine was in the clinic when the earthquake struck and was rescued and transported to the island of Guadeloupe for treatment, but died in hospital. Among those still reported as missing is Diane Caves, who was working with the U.S. Centers for Disease Control and Prevention in Haiti. Many Americans were also seriously wounded in the earthquake, including Christa Brelsford, a native of Anchorage, Alaska, who was interviewed on CNN's Larry King Live after having her lower right leg amputated. The extent of injuries to other Americans working or living in Haiti at the time of the earthquake has not been widely reported.
