= Humanitarian response by non-governmental organizations to the 2010 Haiti earthquake =

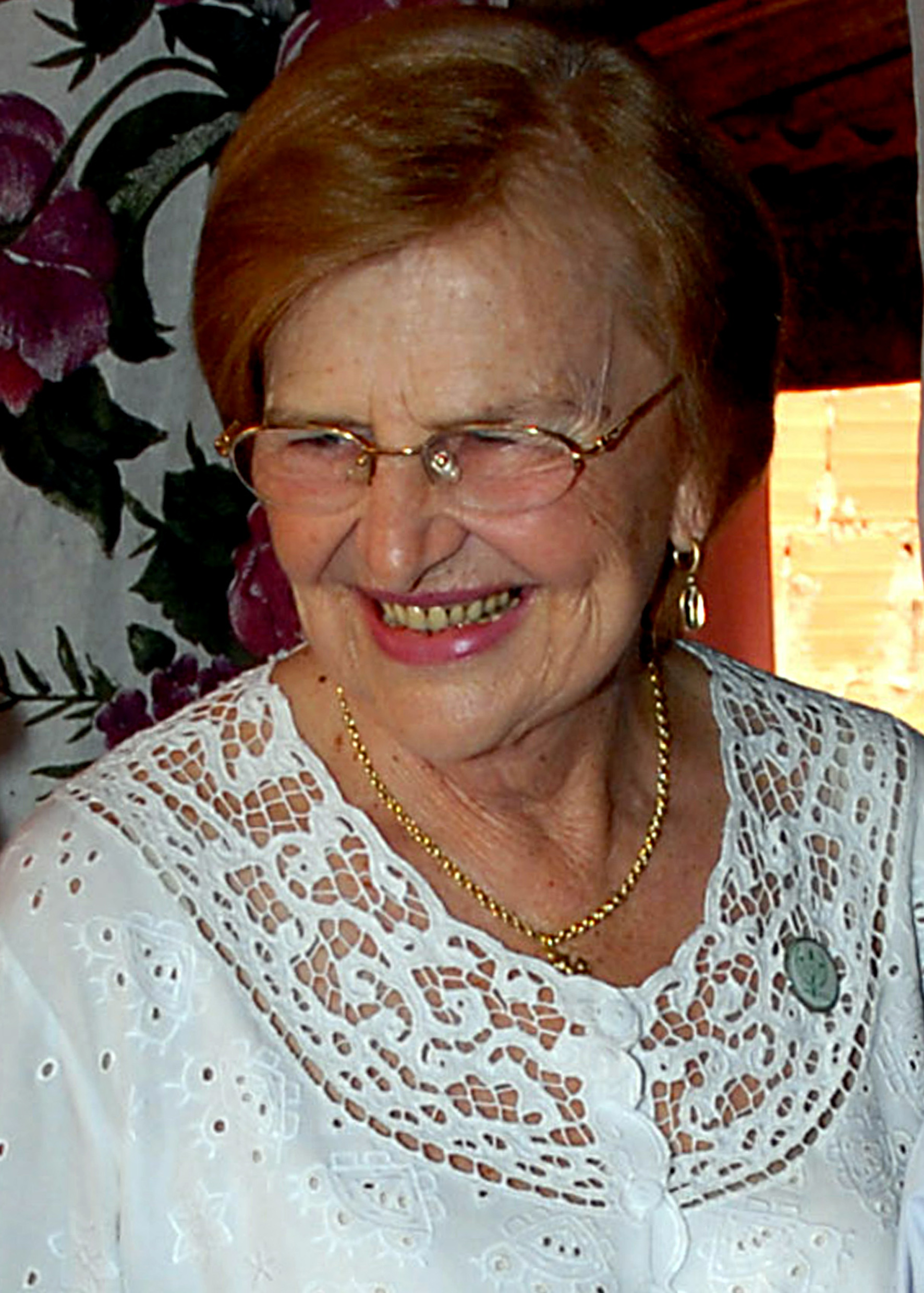
Brazilian pediatrician Zilda Arns was killed in the earthquake.

The humanitarian responses by non-governmental organizations to the 2010 Haiti earthquake included many organisations, such as international, religious, and regionally based NGOs, which immediately pledged support in the aftermath of the 2010 Haiti earthquake. Besides a large multi-contingency contribution by national governments, NGOs contributed significantly to both on-the-ground rescue efforts and external solicitation of aid for the rescue efforts.

== International ==
- Oxfam International - International relief and development agency Oxfam International raised emergency funds to assist relief and rehabilitation efforts on the ground. Oxfam committed to assisting in the rebuilding efforts in Haiti both in the short and long term. Immediate responses included providing clean water, shelter, and sanitation.
- International Committee of the Red Cross - The Red Cross sent tonnes of supplies and hundreds of personnel, and established field hospitals. The number of emergency teams sent to Haiti was equal to the total sent to all 14 countries affect by the 2004 Indian Ocean tsunami. An investigation later found that the Red Cross had only succeeded in building six permanent homes with the US$500 million raised in aid.
- Food for the Poor - Food for the Poor has been able to provide relief to Haiti through the acquisition and delivery of more than 7,100 tons of food, medical supplies, pharmaceuticals, building materials and other goods. The rice, beans, canned goods and water shipped into Haiti were used to provide more than 20 million meals.
- Mercy & Sharing immediately responded by partnering with 18 organizations to distribute aid to school children and abandoned orphans. Mercy & Sharing is a Haitian-registered, non-profit organization operating in Haiti to rescue abused, abandoned, and disabled children.
- World Vision International - World Vision had relief items stored in Haiti in preparation for hurricane season, which it began distributing immediately, although the medical supplies, blankets, tents and other supplies from the Pétion-Ville office quickly ran low. The first flight with 18 metric tonnes of World Vision relief supplies left the organization's Denver, Colorado, United States warehouse on 14 January, and arrived in Port-au-Prince the following night, providing emergency goods for more than 1,000 families, including tarps for temporary shelter; blankets, collapsible water containers, cooking sets and hygiene kits that contain a month's supply of soap, toilet paper, toothbrushes and more for a family of five. The organization's facility in Haiti was damaged, but none of the staff were injured. World Vision subsequently coordinated additional relief flights from their warehouses in Dubai, Panama, Germany, Canada and Denver, carrying the following supplies: tarps, collapsible water containers, shovels, hygiene kits, kitchen sets, blankets, radio equipment, and mosquito nets. World Vision then signed an agreement with Air Serv International to provide one light aircraft to transport people and cargo (14,000 lbs capacity) between Santo Domingo and Port-au-Prince. The first flights began 19 Jan, making two rotations per day. According to relief staff, these flights significantly improved transports of staff and goods.
- Télécoms sans frontières sent teams to establish two calling centers each in the southwestern Port-au-Prince regions of Place Saint Pierre and Boyer.
- SOS Children delivered 21 tonnes of aid to Haiti by road by 21 January. They also brought supplies to Haiti by cargo plane, and had around 60 staff present. In support of their work, they received a £1 million donation from HSBC, and Swedish businessman Roger Hakelius donated US$14 million to support and educate approximately 400 orphan children in Haiti over a 25-year period.
- Humanity First, particularly from Canada, the US and the UK, sent teams of doctors to Haiti. The teams saw at least 10,000 patients. The Humanity First team also shipped 5 tonnes of aid to Haiti. It deployed water infrastructure at a camp to provide daily water to 7,000 people, and had worked to install 2 more filtration units elsewhere.

== Africa ==
=== South Africa ===
- The relief organisation Gift of the Givers (GOTG) departed for Haiti on 14 January. The head of Gift of the Givers, Imtiaz Sooliman, said his group sent three teams of search and rescue specialists to Haiti to help victims of the earthquake. This project cost over R10 million.
- Rescue South Africa sent 40 medical professionals

=== Zambia ===
- Miracle Life Family Church, Lusaka, raised ZMK20 million (US$4,400) for the humanitarian aid.

== Asia ==
=== Bangladesh ===
- BRAC (Bangladesh Rural Advancement Committee), the Bangladesh-based world's largest NGO, had its US wing mobilize resources to support the relief and rehabilitation efforts working with its two partners in Haiti.

=== China ===
==== Special Administrative Regions ====
- (Hong Kong) Local charitable and humanitarian organizations raised over HK$21 million (US$2.7 million) for Haitian relief efforts.
- Macau
  - (International Committee of the Red Cross) The Macau Red Cross donated $M200,000 (US$25,000) while local aid organization Caritas gave another $M150,000 (US$19,000). Local businessman António Ferreira donated an additional M$500,000 (US$62,000) to Macanese efforts in Haiti.

=== Iran ===
- (International Committee of the Red Cross) Iran's Red Crescent planned to send about 30 tonnes of aid including food, tents and medicine to Haiti, with the announcement made on Jan. 14.

=== Israel ===
- IsraAid, an Israeli humanitarian organization, sent a 15-person search-and-rescue team, including emergency medical staff, which arrived in Haiti on Friday, January 15. The IsraAid team set up treatment rooms to treat the injured at the collapsed main hospital in Port-au-Prince. IsraAid also opened a child education center in February in the Pétion-Ville refugee camp, the largest refugee camp in Port-au-Prince area, in cooperation with other agencies, such as Operation Blessing. The center was initially set up in the tents from the IDF's field hospital. In February 2010, a team of medical experts from ALYN Hospital in Jerusalem, one of Israel's major rehabilitation centers that specialized in the rehabilitation of amputees, arrived in Haiti, under the auspices of IsraAid, along with professionals from the Israel Center for the Treatment of Psychotrauma and other volunteers. The team was to assess the needs for provision of rehabilitation for the injured, and train potential Haitian therapists in Israel.
- ZAKA, an organization of voluntary community emergency response teams, dispatched a six person team to assist with identification, extraction and rescue of victims.
- A Magen David Adom delegation was dispatched on January 17 to establish field clinics in cooperation with local rescue groups and as part of a larger American Red Cross mission. Israeli volunteers assisted in the search for the thousands of people thought to be buried under the rubble.
- Israeli volunteers from the Natan Israeli Coalition for International Humanitarian Aid opened a makeshift school in early February to provide education and counseling for 800 pupils in Port-au-Prince, in conjunction with the local government and with aid from the neighboring Dominican Republic.
- The Natan organization announced that 12 delegations would be sent to Haiti in 2010 to assist with the multidisciplinary rehabilitation needed in Haiti.

=== Japan ===
- The Japanese Red Cross dispatched its staff to Haiti to assess the disaster. It also donated ¥20 million (US$220,000) to the International Committee of the Red Cross. It also sent, on 17th Jan., medical team of eight staffs going to be operated for 4 weeks.
- TMAT, a nonprofit organization, sent 11 medical staff members to the border city of Jimani, Dominica.

=== Nepal ===
- The Nepalese nonprofit Lovers’ Association created a Haiti relief fund with a R10,000 deposit and initiated a fundraising drive to support UNICEF's relief efforts.

=== Pakistan ===
- The Edhi Foundation planned to send relief teams to affected areas along with US$500,000 worth of medicines and general supplies.
- The Pakistan Doctors Association announced a plan to send doctors and aid to help victims of quake.

=== South Korea ===
- The Korean Red Cross donated ₩100 million (US$90,000) through the International Committee of the Red Cross. It also started a public fund-raising campaign aiming to raise ₩3 billion (US$2.7 million) to help with relief efforts.
- A civilian medical service team, jointly formed by Korea University and Chosun Ilbo, was to be dispatched on 19 January.
- South Korean companies, including Samsung, Hyundai and LG, responded by donating fund to relief efforts.

=== Taiwan ===
- Tzu Chi - Chinese in Taiwan Buddhist foundation sent 400,000 packs of instant rice, 30 tons of corn meal, 50,000 blankets, 10,000 boxes bottled water, 150,000 anti-inflammatories, 5,000 body bags, and other canned food and medical supplies.

=== Vietnam ===
- (International Committee of the Red Cross) The Vietnam Red Cross Society's Central Committee donated US$20,000 to the relief efforts.

== Europe ==
=== Armenia ===
- (International Committee of the Red Cross) The Armenian General Benevolent Union donated $50,000 to the International Red Cross in Haiti.

=== Belarus ===
- (International Committee of the Red Cross) The Belarusian Red Cross sent immediate aid of CHF 5,000.

=== Bulgaria ===
- (International Committee of the Red Cross) The Bulgarian Red Cross opened up bank accounts and phone lines for making donations, and raised at least 10000 euros to support relief efforts.

=== Croatia ===
- (International Committee of the Red Cross) The Croatian Red Cross opened bank accounts for the country's population to donate, and collected HRK 5,645,757 (US$1,040,000) by March 22.
- The Croatian Military Invalids of the Homeland War Association organized the concert Svi za Haiti (Everyone for Haiti) in Split's Spaladium Arena. Performers included Gibonni, Oliver Dragojević, Thompson, Vinko Coce, Jelena Rozga, Tedi Spalato, Jole, and Luka Nižetić. The concert raised HRK 1,076,397 (US$200,000).

=== Estonia ===
- (International Committee of the Red Cross) The Estonian Red Cross received $230,000 from the Estonian government for its effort in Haiti.

=== Finland ===
- Finn Church Aid and Finland's World Vision pledged €150,000 and €100,000, respectively, to help Haiti. Several organizations were preparing to send aid and rescue workers to Haiti.
- (International Committee of the Red Cross) The Finnish Red Cross (SPR) pledged €200,000 to help Haiti.

=== Netherlands ===
- The Dutch Samenwerkende Hulporganisaties (Joined Aid Organizations) raised €83,500,000.

=== Poland ===
- Poland's UNICEF division gave 100,000 zł (around €25,000) to help victims of the earthquake.
- Polish Medical Mission planned establish a field hospital with medical supplies and a 14-member emergency medical team.
- The Polish Humanitarian Organisation raised over 800,000 zł (around €200,000) in donations.
- Caritas Poland began a public fund-raising campaign, and donated over 1 million zł (US$360,000), with plans of sending additional aid.
- The total amount collected by Caritas Poland, Poland's UNICEF division and Polish Humanitarian Organisation exceeded 5 million zł (around € 1.23 million)

=== Sweden ===
- The Livets Ord Church (Word of Life Church) sent a 9-person medical staff team, including surgeons, emergency-care nursing staff, anesthetists, and support workers, which arrived in Haiti on Thursday, January 21.

=== Turkey ===
- (International Committee of the Red Cross) The Turkish Red Crescent sent two crews that included psychologists and disaster experts to in order to assess the situation and provide urgent assistance in coordination with the Red Cross officials in the field. The Red Crescent planned to send further humanitarian aid teams in the light of the initial team's report.
- The Humanitarian Aid Foundation said that their aid was sent to Haiti from the United States by two cargo planes. The 33 tons of aid includes blankets, clothes, foodstuff, medical equipment, and infant food. Additionally, the Turkish Ministry Of Health sent a fully equipped mobile hospital with 19 staff, including doctors, nurses, and technicians, and two ambulances.

=== United Kingdom ===
- The Disasters Emergency Committee (DEC), an umbrella organisation for 14 UK-registered humanitarian aid agencies, launched an appeal for relief efforts in Haiti which raised £107 million in donations. Interventions provided from those funds included: clean drinking water for over 250,000 people; emergency shelter for over 100,000 people; building 3,000 latrines; over 2,500 ‘cash for work’ public service projects; medical consultations for over 100,000 people; and supplementary feeding for 1,890 malnourished children. A poll conducted on behalf of the DEC by the Charities Aid Foundation over the 23rd and 24 January indicated that 48% of the UK public had so far donated, and of those that hadn't yet, 62% might or were planning to.
- Humanity First UK
- St Eugene's Cathedral in Derry, Northern Ireland raised almost £25,000 by 20 January 2010.
- United Haitians in the UK (UHUK) have been collecting donations of supplies to send out and helping Haitians in the UK make contact with their relatives.

== North America ==
A combination of Canadian and United States medical staff used Anís Zunúzí Bahá'í School as its headquarters and some of its Haitian staff were able to use the site as a makeshift clinic. The 18 team members came with donated medical supplies, including more than 2,000 packages of antibiotics and other medicine. The team consisted of one professional nurse, two pediatricians, two orthopedic surgeons, four obstetrician/gynecologists, an intensive care specialist, a hospital doctor, a respiratory therapists, and a fourth-year medical student. They all took commercial flights to the Dominican Republic and then traveled by bus to Haiti, and were able to stay for a week (leaving around Feb 5th.) The team traveled to other localities, including hospitals, orphanages, and temporary medical stations set up in nearby villages. Some of the staff of the Zunuzi school provided translation services to aid the medical staff. The group spontaneously organized mostly through Facebook. The group are planning on a return trip in March.

=== Haiti ===
- Haiti Arise, an organization based in Grand-Goave, Haiti which also with branches in Canada and the United States, established an earthquake relief fund. The Canadian branch undertook a significant fund-raising campaign, with every dollar raised being matched by the Canadian government. They worked to distribute water, rice, and other supplies. A group of high school students from British Columbia, Canada, who had arrived in Haiti just hours before the earthquake, used CA$2,500 of their own money to buy and distribute rice to more than 500 local residents affected by the quake.

=== Aruba ===
- (International Committee of the Red Cross) Red Cross Aruba collected funds from Aruban citizens and companies, and noted a positive response to its fund-raising efforts. It opened bank accounts at all local banks to collect direct donations, and these donations were sent to Red Cross International, which coordinated relief efforts with emergency supplies, technical assistance, and other support to those in Haiti. Red Cross Aruba also organized a relief effort to send local doctors and surgeons to Haiti to provide medical assistance along with Red Cross volunteers from Aruba.

=== Canada ===
- (International Committee of the Red Cross) The Canadian Red Cross reported that as of January 17, 2010, it had received $22 million in donations from Canadians.
- The Guru Nanak Sikh Gurdwara Society, a Sikh temple from Surrey, British Columbia, along with local South Asian radio stations, managed to raise over $100,000 CAD in donations on January 14, 2010. As of January 21, $1,500,000 had been raised by the temple and radio stations. A portion of the money was given to the Governor General of Canada to be given directly to the Haitian government, while the remainder was to go to Médecins Sans Frontières (Doctor's Without Borders) and United Sikhs, an NGO which provided disaster relief in Haiti
- Humanity First Canada held several fundraising events for relief efforts in Haiti.
- Inuit Tapiriit Kanatami collected $90,000 for the relief effort.
- The Canadian Salvation Army.

=== Dominican Republic ===
- VICINI and the INICIA Foundation announced an immediate cash donation of US$1 million. In addition, another US$5 million was donated by VICINI in products, services, and technical personnel.
- The Red Cross Dominicana it was involved at the border coordinating aid and providing medical attention for 100,000 families.

Government:

- The Dominican Republic was the first country in the world to provide aid to Haiti, and the Dominican Government approved a special budget to Haiti Aids of US$6.4 million to focus on health programs (US$1.7 million), food programs (US$1.4 million), the army (US$1.5 million), and others.
- SESPAS - (Health Ministry) sent ambulances, doctors, and nurses to the border and Haiti. It also operated various hospitals and health centers to help Haitians. The most critical patients (such as the Haitian President of Congress) were sent to Santiago and Santo Domingo for specials care.
- FFAA - (National Army) sent diverse aid including personnel, trucks, helicopters, planes, and other supports to the border to assist with and coordinate the distribution of aid to Haiti.
- IDAC - (Instituto de Aviación Civil) created a special fleet with public and private airplanes (23) and helicopters (14) to send aid to the border.
- DGA - (Dirección General de Aduanas) approved tax-free status for all aid arriving in the DR through airports and ports, including equipment, water, medicines, and other aid materials
- SEOPC - (Secretaria Obras Públicas) sent equipment to remove and clean streets, bridges, and other infrastructure to facilitate distribution of aid by land.
- INDOTEL - (Telecommunication Institute) sent digital phones and technicians to reestablish communications.

Private sector:

- Vicini, Free Trade Zone Association (ADOZONA), Labor Ministry, Public Energy Corporation (CDEEE), and Conep President Lizandro Macarrulla announced a special conjoint program for help Haiti.
- INCA - (Industrias Nacionales) gave 50,000 zinc pieces to rebuild houses, including roofs and walls
- Grupo Leon Jimenes donated RD$5,000,000 pesos in aids for Haiti
- Codetel, Orange, Viva, and Tricom (Telecommunication companies) used text messages (SMS) to collect money for Haiti
- Escogido Baseball Club collected donations at baseball stadiums with baseball players, executives and the public donating
- Grupo M sent containers with food and medicines
- Nacional, Pola, and Cadena Supermarkets collected food and water donations in all supermarkets countrywide
- Junta Agroempresarial Dominicana create a program to send food in partnership with agricultural business producers.

=== Mexico ===
The Topos de Tlatelolco volunteer search and rescue group participated in relief efforts. They specialized in finding victims under rubble and giving first aid. The first group of six left on 14 January for the country from Cancún. This group was called the advance team, or the beachhead, as their job was to make initial assessments of the situation for the teams to follow. The canine unit was also going to be sent. A total of 18 to 24 groups were expected to go, with transportation being provided by the Mexican navy. The group planned to be there until 28 January. Also, doctors from the University of Montemorelos travelled to Haiti at the request of the Seventh-Day Adventist Hospital in Port-au-Prince.

=== United States ===
In the United States, the FBI and Better Business Bureau issued a warning about phony charities, and implored prospective donors to check the reputation of a charity before making a donation due to previous incidents of fraudulent charities. On January 13, 2010, the Better Business Bureau released a list of charities requesting aid for Haiti relief efforts. This list only contained charities that met the BBB's "Wise Giving" standards.

The following organizations publicly announced their intentions or actions to help Haitian victims:

- AARP - Offered a dollar-for-dollar match on donations to its foundation, reaching $500,000 in donations for the relief efforts through this endeavor.
- Action Against Hunger
- Adventist Development and Relief Agency - Created a Haiti Earthquake Response Fund. An initial pledge of US$1,000,000 was announced on January 14, 2010
- Adventist Health International - Supported Hopital Adventiste d'Haiti, one of the few fully functioning hospitals in Port-au-Prince.
- Aid For Haiti (AFH) - A faith-based effort providing and coordinating medical relief in Petit Goave, Haiti.
- American Humane Association participated in the relief efforts through the Animal Relief Coalition for Haiti, a coalition created by the World Society for the Protection of Animals (Now known as World Animal Protection) and the International Fund for Animal Welfare.
- American Jewish World Service - Created a Haiti Earthquake Relief Fund.
- (International Committee of the Red Cross) American Red Cross - Initial contribution of US$1,000,000, which was increased to US$10,000,000 million on January 14, 2010.
- AmeriCares - Sent US$3,000,000 worth of medical aid.
- The American Methodist Church through UMCOR donated over US$1,000,000, and planned to raise more.
- Armenian National Committee of America - Has urged Armenian-Americans to pledge money and send aid to the American Red Cross.
- Broadway Cares/Equity Fights AIDS donated US$100,000 to the Haiti relief efforts.
- CARE USA
- Catholic Relief Services - Initial contribution of US$5,000,000. US$200,000,000 over the next five years.
- Christian Reformed World Relief Committee
- The Church of Jesus Christ of Latter-day Saints - 225,000 pounds (102,000 kg) of tents, clothes, food, medical supplies, hygiene, and newborn kits. A team of doctors was also sent and LDS chapels were being used as shelters for over 5,000 Haitian residents.
- Clinton Bush Haiti Fund
- Compassion International -
- Direct Relief - Sent two shipping containers of medical supplies, and US$2,000,000 in aid.
- Epispocal Relief & Development
- Family Health International
- Florida Baptist Convention
- Flying Doctors of America - Medical Teams
- Food For The Poor - Planned to raise 20 Million to address a wide variety of needs.
- Grassroots International, which has worked in Haiti for over 20 years, established an Earthquake Response Fund.
- Ford Foundation - US$1,000,000 in grants to support urgent humanitarian relief efforts. The grants, for $500,000 each, were to go to Oxfam International and Partners in Health.
- Giving Children Hope worked to get necessary medicines and supplies on the ground.
- Habitat for Humanity - Sent an assessment team on January 13, 2010.
- Hands On Disaster Response had a mission of staff and up to eighty volunteers in Leogane conducting inter-organization coordination and logistical support, medical support, demolition of damaged houses, and temporary and transitional shelter design, fabrication and disbursement. The mission was slated to run until August, 2010.
- Humanity First USA
- International Bottled Water Association
- Islamic Relief planned to fly a US$1,000,000 shipment to Haiti, in coordination with the Church of Jesus Christ of Latter-day Saints.
- Konbit Sante - A Maine/Haiti partnership to improve healthcare in northern Haiti held a telethon to raise money for relief efforts in Haiti.
- Lance Armstrong Foundation - US$250,000.
- Lutheran World Relief - Committed an initial US$1,000,000.
- Meds & Food for Kids - Had an influx of donations and support following the earthquake that enabled the organization to increase production of their Ready-to-use Therapeutic Food (RUTF), "Medika Mamba," which was used to feed malnourished and vulnerable individuals in Haiti.
- Mennonite Central Committee - committed US$100,000 for immediate needs with an additional US$1,000,000 anticipated
- Mercy Corps - Sent supplies.
- Not on our Watch - donated $1,000,000.
- Operation USA - Sent medical aid.
- Oxfam America - Raised emergency funds to assist relief and rehabilitation efforts on the ground, in both the long and short term. Immediate responses included providing clean water, shelter, and sanitation.
- Partners In Health - PIH has been working in Haiti for 20 years to provide health care and train health providers, and is currently prioritizing the deployment of additional surgical teams
- Rainbow World Fund, an international relief agency based in the LGBT community, set up a Haiti relief fund.
- Salvation Army
- Save the Children
- Seacoast Church raised more than $287,000, which was donated to Water Missions International to provide a new water purification system for use in Haiti.
- ShelterBox USA - ShelterBox USA provided victims of disaster with shelter and basic provisions.
- Southern Baptist Convention - Sent an assessment team made up of representatives from Baptist Global Response, the North American Mission Board and disaster relief specialists from the Kentucky, Mississippi and South Carolina state conventions. A second team was to be sent by the Florida state convention. Both teams planned to assess both immediate and long-term needs, and report their findings and recommended actions to Southern Baptist Disaster Relief. Funding for the relief effort was to be coordinated through the International Mission Board disaster relief fund.
- The Unitarian Universalist Service Committee and the Unitarian Universalist Association of Congregations created a Haiti relief fund on January 14, 2010.
- Individual congregations of the United Church of Christ, United Methodist Church and Baptists contributed thousands of meals and were planning to give more, although the Methodist Church's response was hampered by the fate of its disaster relief chairman, the Rev. Sam Dixon, who was in Haiti's capital at the time of the earthquake.
- YMCA World Service - Worked in collaboration with the Red Cross, Action Churches Together, and other relief and emergency agencies to respond to the urgent basic needs of those displaced by providing food, water, medicines, blankets. In the longer term, they planned to provide care and psycho-social counseling. In addition, the Dominican Republic YMCA and the Latin American and Caribbean Alliance of YMCAs, with support from the global YMCA movement, planned to deliver critical supplies and support to those impacted.
- Website Reddit.com launched a campaign with its users and raised over $116,000.
- University of Pittsburgh Medical Center's Children's Hospital took in 53 orphans for treatment. The children, as young as six months, had been living in the Port-au-Prince Bresma Orphanage run by two Pittsburgh-native sisters. Pennsylvania Governor Ed Rendell and Representative Jason Altmire flew with a group of medical staff to Haiti and returned with the 53 children. 47 of the children had adoption cases in progress from the United States, Canada and Spain, many of which were in the final stages.

== See also ==
- Humanitarian response by national governments to the 2010 Haiti earthquake
- Humanitarian response by for-profit organizations to the 2010 Haiti earthquake
