= Austin Celtic Association =

The Austin Celtic Association is a non-profit organization based in Central Texas. Its goal is to celebrate and promote the Celtic culture through music, dance, language, sports, history, and the arts. Since 1997, they have shared the Celtic culture of Ireland, Scotland, Brittany, Nova Scotia, Wales, and other countries with Austin and Central Texas.

The Austin Celtic Association main production and the event that organization focuses for the most part is the Austin Celtic Festival the first full weekend in November each year, featuring world-class musicians, dance, language, sports, history, and the arts. Headlining performers include and have included major stars in the world of traditional Irish or Celtic Music such as Frankie Gavin and De Dannan, Paddy Keenan, The Prodigals, John Doyle, Daithi Sproule, Cillian Valelly, Liz Carroll, The Makem and Spain Brothers, and Joe Burke. Local musicians that appear regularly at the festival include Ed Miller, Jeff Moore, The Tea Merchants and the Silver Thistle Pipes and Drums.
