= Coriolanus (disambiguation) =

Coriolanus is a tragedy by William Shakespeare.

Coriolanus or Coriolan may also refer to:

People or fictional characters

- Anne Marie Coriolan, Haitian feminist and activist
- Coriolanus Snow, a fictional character in the Hunger Games trilogy
- Coriolan Ardouin, Haitian romantic poet
- Coriolan Brediceanu, Austro-Hungarian Romanian lawyer and politician
- Coriolan Suciu, Austro-Hungarian-born Romanian teacher and historian
- Gaius Marcius Coriolanus, a Roman general in the 5th century BC and the protagonist of Shakespeare's play

Films or plays

- Coriolan, a 1804 play by Heinrich Joseph von Collin
- Coriolanus (Brecht), Bertolt Brecht's 1950s adaptation of Shakespeare's play
- Coriolanus (film), a 2011 film adaptation of Shakespeare's play by Ralph Fiennes
- Coriolanus: Hero without a Country, a 1964 Italian film with Gordon Scott

Music

- Coriolan Overture, a 1807 composition by Ludwig van Beethoven for Collin's play
- Coriolano ossia L'assedio di Roma, 1808 opera seria by Giuseppe Nicolini
