= OGHS =

OGHS is an acronym for:

- One Great Hour of Sharing, an annual offering taken to fund the United Methodist Committee on Relief
- Orange Glen High School in Escondido, California, United States
- Otago Girls' High School in Dunedin, Otago, New Zealand
- Ottawa-Glandorf High School in Ottawa, Ohio, United States
