= Micha Gaillard =

Haitian politician and academic (1957–2010)

Michel "Micha" Gaillard (1957 – January 14, 2010) was a Haitian politician, opposition leader and university professor.

== Political role ==
He was a major voice of opposition against the 2004 coup d'état which ousted President Jean-Bertrand Aristide. In 2005, he helped found the Fusion of Haitian Social Democrats political party.

== 2010 earthquake ==
Gaillard was killed in the 2010 Haiti earthquake. He was attending a meeting at the Ministry of Justice when the quake struck. He survived the initial disaster but died of his injuries a day and a half later, at roughly 4:15 am on January 14.

== See also ==
- Casualties of the 2010 Haiti earthquake
