= David Grene =

American classic scholar (1913–2002)

David Grene (13 April 1913 – 10 September 2002) was an Irish-American professor of classics at the University of Chicago from 1937 until his death. He was a co-founder of the Committee on Social Thought and is best known for his translations of ancient Greek literature.

== Life ==
David Grene was born in Dublin. He studied at Trinity College Dublin and was awarded his MA in 1936. His translations include Herodotus' Histories, Aeschylus' Prometheus Bound and Seven Against Thebes, Sophocles' Oedipus Rex, Electra, and Philoctetes and Euripides's Hippolytus. Grene was a close friend and colleague of philosopher Allan Bloom and Nobel laureate Saul Bellow.

One of Grene's memoirs, Of Farming and Classics, was published posthumously by the University of Chicago Press in 2006. From 1938 to 1961, he was married to Marjorie Glicksman Grene, the philosopher, who worked on the family farms, first in Illinois, and later in Ireland, as well as writing on existentialism; she was the mother of Ruth and Nicholas Grene.

== Family ==
Ruth Grene is a professor of plant physiology at Virginia Tech. Nicholas Grene is Emeritus Professor of English Literature at Trinity College Dublin, where his father took his first degree. After divorcing Marjorie, Grene married Ethel Weiss, and fathered the twins, Gregory Grene (lead singer and accordionist for Irish jig-punk band The Prodigals), and Andrew Grene, who was working for the United Nations when he died in the 2010 Haiti earthquake; Andrew's body was confirmed by the Department of Foreign Affairs on 19 January 2010 to have been found in the wreckage of Haiti's destroyed UN building. Grene had been meeting with the head of the UN in Haiti at the time of his death. The body of Andrew Grene was brought home to Belturbet, County Cavan on 30 January 2010 and buried beside his father after a funeral the following day. A charity, the Andrew Grene Foundation, was set up in his memory.

== Translations and edited works ==
- Three Greek tragedies, Aeschylus's Prometheus bound, Sophocles's Oedipus Rex, Euripides's Hippolytus, The University of Chicago Press, 1942.
- Greek Tragedies, edited and translated by David Grene and Richmond Lattimore, 3 volumes, works of Aeschylus, Sophocles, and Euripides, University of Chicago Press, 1960.
- The Complete Greek Tragedies, edited and translated by David Grene and Richmond Lattimore, 7 volumes, New York, Modern Library, 1960.
- Antigone, edited and translated by David Grene and edited by Richmond Lattimore. With supplementary materials prepared by Walter James Miller, New York, Washington Square Press, 1970.
- The History, by Herodotus, University of Chicago Press, 1987
- The Oresteia, by Aeschylus, translated by David Grene and Wendy Doniger O'Flaherty, with introductions by David Grene, Wendy Doniger O'Flaherty, and Nicholas Rudall, The University of Chicago Press, 1989.
- The Peloponnesian War, by Thucydides, the complete Hobbes translation, with notes and a new introduction by David Grene, University of Chicago Press, 1989.
