= Nikolay Sukhomlin =

Nikolay Borisovich Sukhomlin (Russian: Николай Борисович Сухомлин; April 1945, in Leningrad – 12 January 2010, in Haiti) was a Russian scientist who discovered new solutions and symmetry for the Black-Scholes equation.

Sukhomlin received his master's degree in physics in 1967, from the Faculty of Physical Sciences, Leningrad University in St. Petersburg, Russia. He obtained a double Ph.D. in applied mathematics and physics in 1982 from Lomonosov Moscow State University. He also holds a Ph.D. in history of arts from University of Paris 1 Pantheon-Sorbonne (France) in 1998.

Between 1971 and 1991, Sukhomlin taught as assistant professor at St. Petersburg University, Elista State University (Russia) and the St. Petersburg National Academy of Cosmos and Aviation Engineering. From 1992 to 1998, he was lecturer and associate professor at the Department of Mathematics and Computer Science, Paris 8 University, France. In 1998, he was invited professor of the University of Haiti, and in 1999 he stayed as invited professor at the National Haitian Diplomatic Academy and Quisqueya University in Haiti. From 2000 on, he taught at the Faculty of Sciences, Autonomous University of Santo Domingo (UASD), Dominican Republic, and as professor in economics at the Pontifical Catholic University (PUCMM) in Santo-Domingo, Dominican Republic.

Sukhomlin was stuck between rubbles after the Institut Aimé Césaire collapsed. He died after 24 hours of suffering due to the lack of emergency response in Haiti during the 2010 earthquake.

== Publications ==
- Problema de calibración de mercado y estructura implícita del modelo de bonos de Black-Cox. – Universidad Pablo de Olavide, de Sevilla: Departamento de Economía, Métodos Cuantitativos e Historia Económica, 2010
- Problema de calibración de mercado y estructura implícita del modelo de bonos de Black-Cox. – Universidad Pablo de Olavide Sevilla 2010 // Revista de Métodos Cuantitativos para la Economía y la Empresa 1886-516X, No. 10, 2010, p. 73-98
- Simetría y nuevas soluciones de la ecuación de vibraciones de una viga elástica. – in: Ingeniería y ciencia (Medellín) Vol. 05, No. 09, Jun. 2009, p. 25-44
- Estudio de simetria y de posibilidades de la resolucion exacta de las ecuaciones de Schrödinger y de Hamilton – Jacobi para un sistema aislado. – Rep. Dominicana : Instituto Tecnológico de Santo Domingo, 2004 // in: Ciencia y Sociedad (Santo Domingo) Vol. 29, No. 03, Jul.-Sep. 2004, p. 426-435.
- Simetría y nuevas soluciones de la ecuación de Black Scholes. – Asociación Matemática Venezolana (AMV), 2004
- Solution exacte du problème inverse de valorisation des options dans le cadre du modèle de Black et Scholes. – preprint
