= Christopher Hotel =

Hotel in Port-au-Prince, Haiti, victim of the 2010 Haiti earthquake

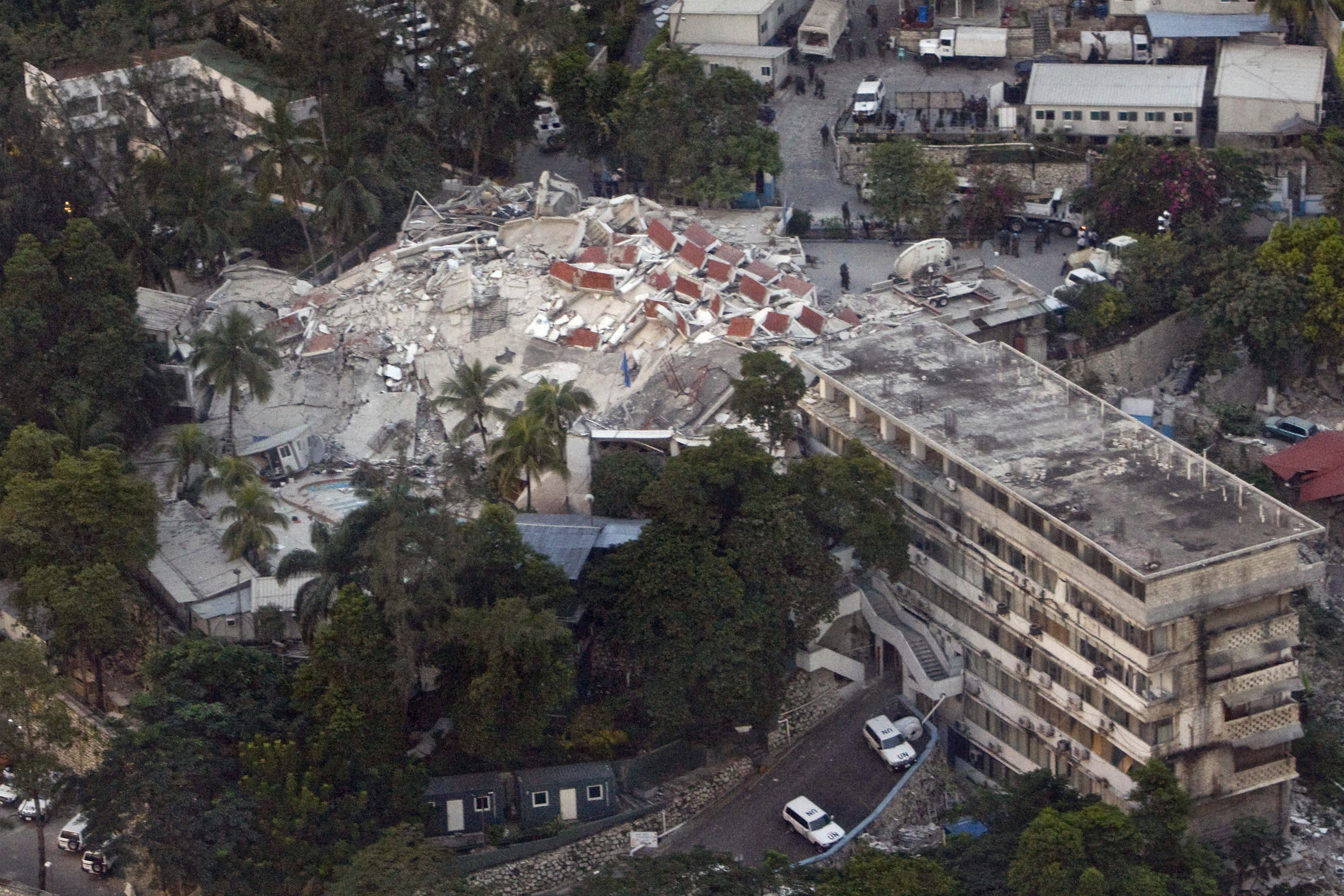
- The Christopher Hotel, after its collapse

- Location within Haiti

General information
- Location: Port-au-Prince, Haiti
- Coordinates: 18°32′20.76″N 72°18′43.56″W
- Closed: January 12, 2010 (destroyed)

The hotel in relation to the city, under the notation "MINUSTAH Headquarters"

The Christopher Hotel (also called Hotel Christopher) was a hotel in Port-au-Prince, Haiti, destroyed in the 2010 Haiti earthquake on 12 January 2010.

Prior to its destruction, it was a 3-star, 74-key, 5-story hotel built into the hillside, overlooking the capital of Haiti, Port-au-Prince. The hotel housed the headquarters for the United Nations Stabilization Mission in Haiti. The hotel allegedly did not meet the UN's Minimum Operational Safety Standard, and reportedly the stabilization mission's 2009 procurement plan contained a budget allocation of US$400,000 to bring it into compliance.

== History ==
In 1993, the mayor of Port-au-Prince, Evans Paul, escaped an assassination attempt at the hotel.

In 1999, the Haitian Civic Political Front was formed, and its first congress was held at the hotel.

In 2005, a Filipino UN peacekeeper was shot by a sniper at the hotel.

The hotel housed the headquarters for the United Nations Stabilization Mission in Haiti since 2004. According to a 2008 statement from the UN's Department of Peacekeeping Operations, the "decision to select the Hotel Christopher was based on a locally completed analytical process which determined that this facility was one of the few premises in Port au Prince which would meet the Mission's requirements with regards to space, water and power. It is also in a neighbourhood that was judged in 2004 to be among the safest in Port au Prince." The statement also indicated that the UN was paying a monthly rent of US$94,000 to a private individual, Dr. Gerard Desir.

=== Destruction ===
In the collapse during the 7.0 magnitude event of 12 January 2010, several people were trapped, hurt or killed. The UN's head-of-mission, Hédi Annabi, the deputy head, Luiz Carlos da Costa, and the UN international police commander (Royal Canadian Mounted Police Superintendent) Doug Coates were killed. After the collapse, over 150 UN personnel were reportedly unaccounted for at the hotel. The moment the earthquake struck, Annabi, da Costa and Coates were meeting with eight Chinese nationals (four peacekeepers and four senior police officers). A Chinese search and rescue team recovered the bodies of these ten individuals on 16 January 2010. Jens Kristensen, senior humanitarian officer for the UN, was rescued by a Virginia Beach, Virginia team after five days trapped in the rubble.

== See also ==
- Hôtel Montana
