= Gregory Grene =

American musician based in New York City

Gregory Grene is an American musician and teacher based in New York City, who grew up in Chicago and County Cavan, Ireland. He is the son of the classicist David Grene. With his band The Prodigals, he writes and plays a style of music that melds Irish traditional and rock influences, and has produced and recorded nine albums with them, as well as a solo album, FlipSides (2008), with musicians ranging from John Doyle, former guitarist with Solas, to Tony Cedras, a multi-instrumentalist who has played in Paul Simon's band since the Graceland tour. Grene's music has received critical acclaim over the years, was included in the Rough Guide to Irish Music compilation, and was featured in the soundtrack for Pride and Glory, a movie starring Ed Norton, Colin Farrell, Jon Voight and Noah Emmerich, as well as on television in the ABC show Mercy and the FX series It's Always Sunny in Philadelphia.

He currently teaches English literature at Greenwich Country Day School in Connecticut. He also previously worked as Director of Music for the New York advertising agency FCB, and in that capacity recorded tracks ranging from reggae in Kingston to the Beatles tracks and symphonic music in Abbey Road, and has spoken on Shoot and Billboard music industry panels in New York and Las Vegas.

Prior to his musical work, Grene worked as an actor, appearing in both regional and Broadway theater, and in independent film.

Gregory Grene's twin brother, Andrew Grene, died in the 2010 Haiti earthquake while working for the United Nations. Grene currently serves as US Director for a 501(c)3 public charity established in Andrew's name, the Andrew Grene Foundation, which works with education and microfinance in Haiti.
