= Zilda Arns =

Brazilian philanthropist

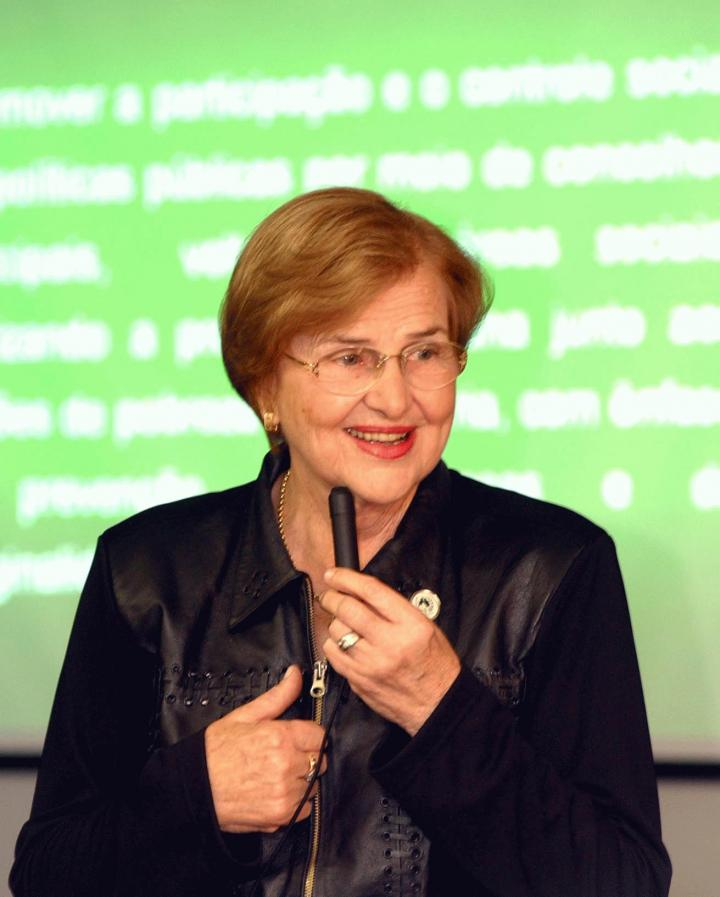
- Zilda Arns in 2004
- Born: Zilda Arns Neumann; August 25, 1934; Forquilhinha, Santa Catarina, Brazil
- Died: January 12, 2010 (aged 75); Porto Príncipe, Haiti
- Education: Federal University of Paraná
- Occupations: doctor; pediatric doctor; sanitation expert
- Known for: Founding the Pastoral Care for the Elderly and the Pastoral Care for Children
- Spouse: Aloísio Bruno Neumann
- Children: 6
- Relatives: Paulo Evaristo Arns (brother); Flávio Arns (nephew); Leonardo Ulrich Steiner (cousin)

Signature
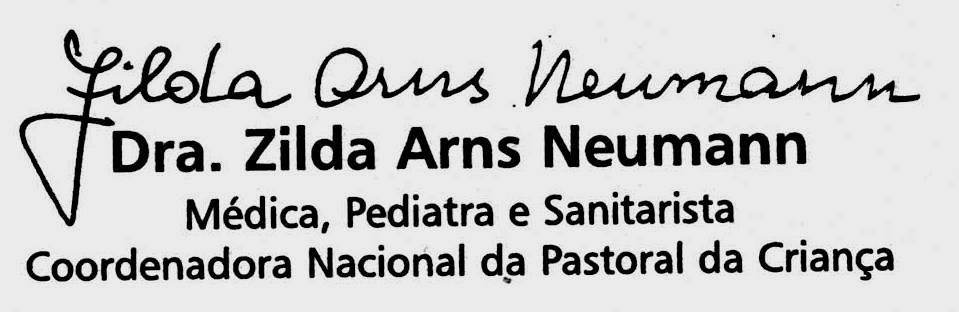

Zilda Arns Neumann (25 August 1934 – 12 January 2010) was a Brazilian pediatrician, sanitation experts, and aid worker.

A sister of Cardinal Dom Paulo Evaristo Arns, the former Archbishop of São Paulo known for his efforts against the Brazilian military dictatorship, Zilda Arns became internationally known by founding a Catholic pastoral care for poor children. Her humanitarian work, which also included the poor and the elderly, spanned over three decades.

She received numerous special mentions and honorary citizenship titles in the country. Similarly, the Children's Pastoral has been awarded several prizes for its work since its founding. In 2012, in a selection process using an international format, Arns was elected the 17th greatest Brazilian of all time.

In January 2015, the beatification process for Zilda Arns was initiated in recognition of her charitable works. Arns died on January 12, 2010, as a result of the 2010 Haiti earthquake. In 2015, the Archdiocese of São Paulo intended to start a diocesan investigation in order to open a beatification process.

On April 20, 2023, she was inscribed by the Brazilian government in the Book of Heroes and Heroines of the Fatherland.

== Early life and education ==
Born on August 25 1934, in the rural town of Forquilhinha, Arns was the 13th out of 16 children of Gabriel Arns and Helene Arns (née Steiner). She was the aunt of Senator Flávio Arns.

Two of Arns' memories were of seeing her father go door-to-door on his horse to help contain a smallpox epidemic and watching her mother arrange for a sick neighbour to be taken to the nearest hospital on the back of a cart, a journey of three hours. Those acts inspired her contemplate life as a doctor, even most of her priests or teachers.

Having studied medicine, she graduated in 1959 from the Federal University of Paraná. Arns further studied public health, with the aim of assisting poor children in environments plagued with high child mortality rates, malnutrition and violence.

== Career ==
After she worked in local hospitals tending to infants, she was then given charge of a string of clinics on the impoverished outskirts of the southern city of Curitiba.

Arns was the founder coordinator of Pastoral da Criança (Pastoral Care for Children), an organization for social action of the National Conference of Bishops of Brazil. The Care for Children has one of the largest programs in the world devoted to child health and nutrition. The program has about 260,000 volunteers and has reduced infant mortality by more than half in over 31,000 urban and rural communities of intense poverty.

Arns also coordinated Pastoral da Pessoa Idosa (Pastoral Care for Elderly Persons), and social action organisms of the Episcopal Conference of Brazil.

As a Catholic, Arns condemned contraception. Her approach was based on familial education in order to help decrease the rates of petty crime and preventable diseases.

== Personal life ==
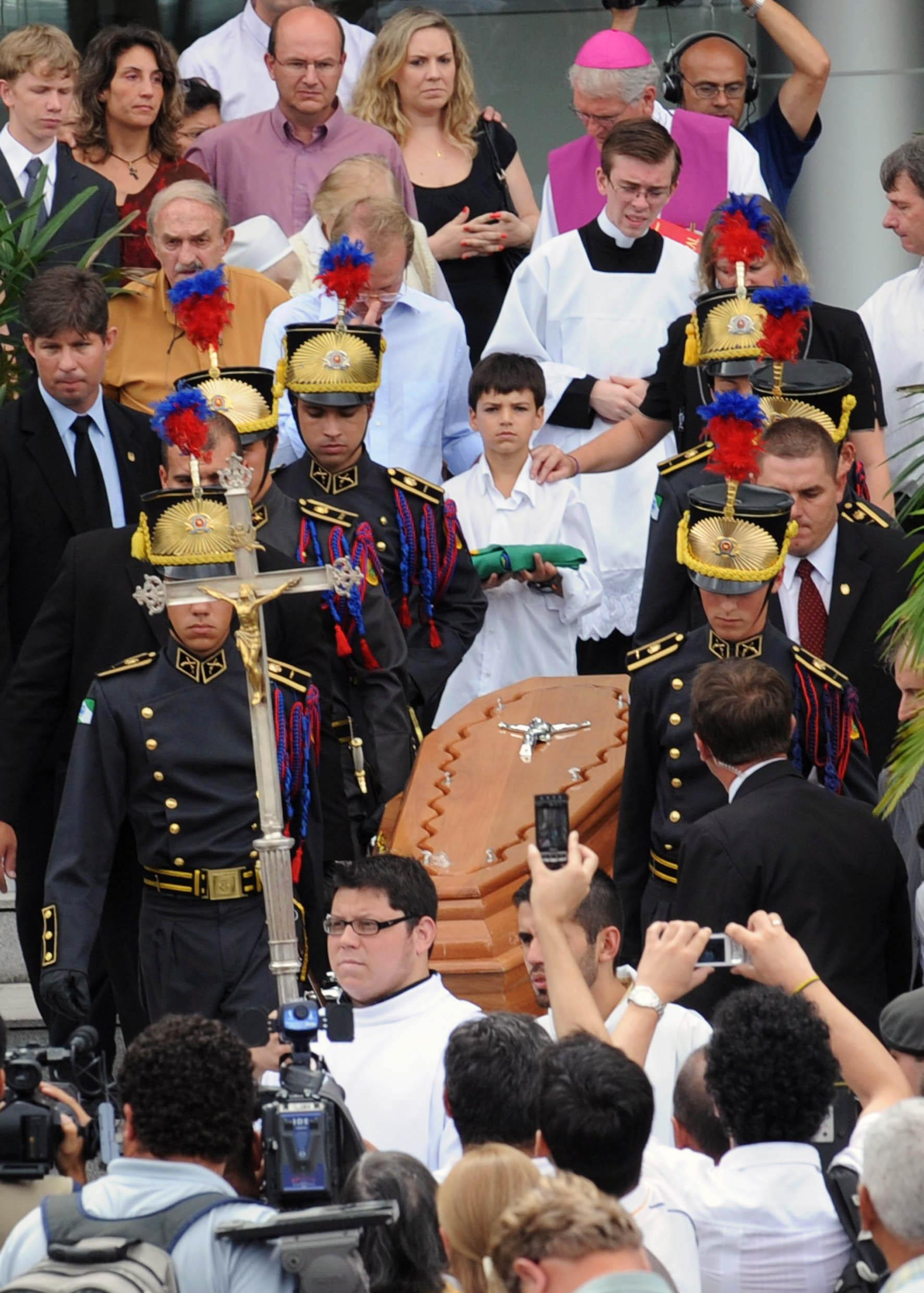
The funeral of Zilda Arns

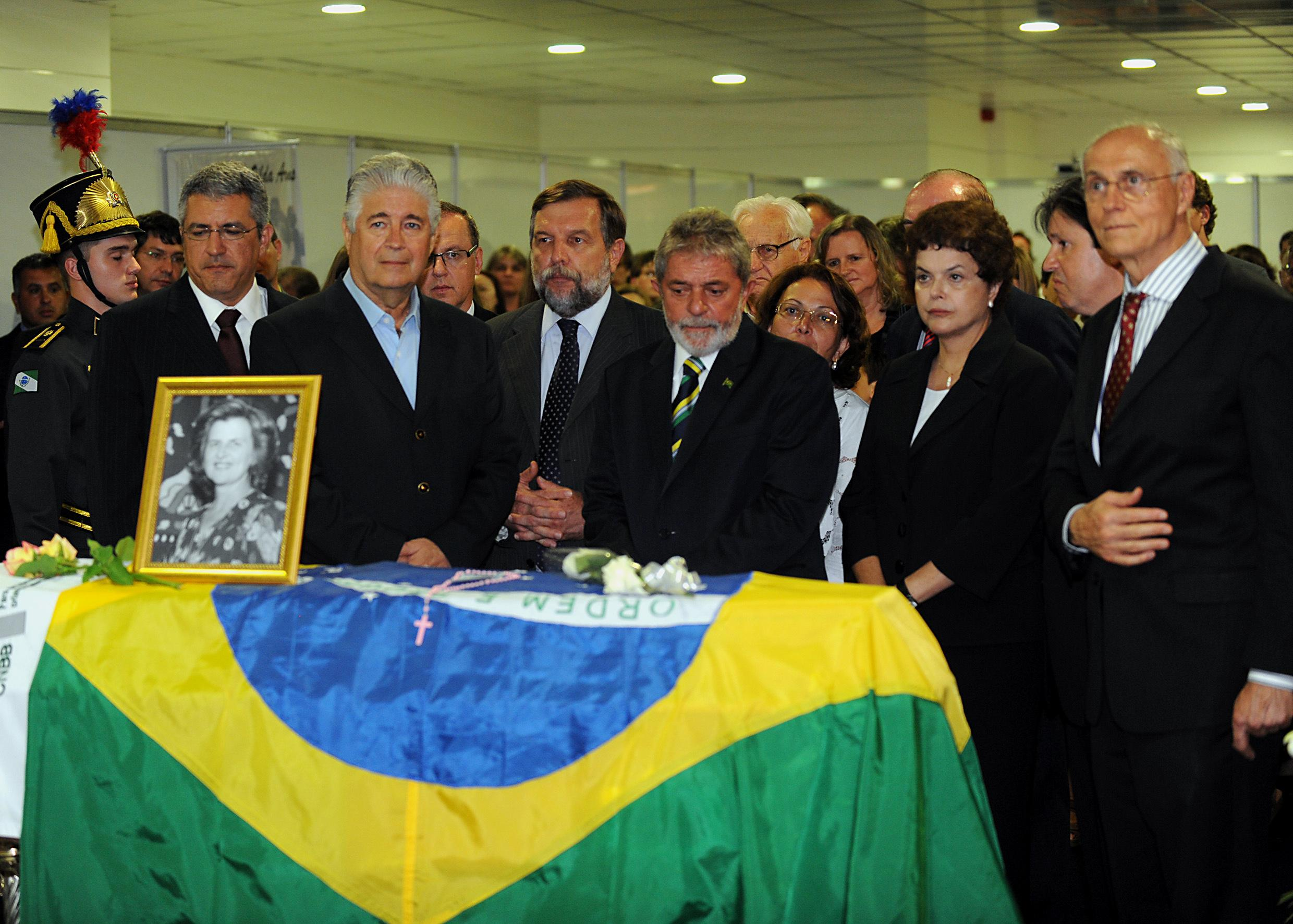
President Lula and Senator Flávio Arns, among other authorities, at the funeral of Zilda Arns.

Widowed since 1978, she was a mother of four and grandmother of ten. Arns was killed by the Haiti earthquake of 12 January 2010 in Port-au-Prince, where she was carrying out humanitarian activities on behalf of Pastoral da Criança. She was struck in the head by falling debris from the roof of a church in which she had just given a speech. She was 75 years old at the time. Brazilian President Luiz Inácio Lula da Silva attended her funeral.

== Awards and honours ==
She was awarded with several honorary citizen titles throughout Brazil. She was also recognized as a Public Health Heroe by Pan American Health Organization

== See also ==
- Casualties of the 2010 Haiti earthquake
