= Humanity First =

International non-governmental organization

- Founded: 1995
- Founder: Mirza Tahir Ahmad
- Type: International non-governmental organization
- Registration no.: England & Wales 1149693
- Purpose: Education/training; Advancement of health and saving of lives Prevention and relief of poverty Overseas aid/famine relief
- Origins: London, United Kingdom
- Region served: Worldwide - Registered in 67 countries
- Method: Disaster Relief and Long Term Projects
- Revenue: ▲$5,590,710 (2017)
- Website: humanityfirst.org

Humanity First is an international charity that provides disaster relief and long term development assistance to vulnerable communities in 67 countries across 6 continents. The organisation is run by volunteers with diverse skillsets across the world and has access to thousands of extra volunteers worldwide. Volunteer staff in all areas (operations, expert medics, engineers and teachers) often pay their own expenses to support the international projects.

The organisation differentiates itself in the aid industry with a high level of efficiency. Extensive use of volunteers, partnerships and global sourcing result in high levels of funds going straight to projects. Similarly, the value of the aid delivered (projects as well as free man-hours of doctors, engineers and teachers) is greater than the value of donations received. Uniquely, volunteer staff often pay their own international expenses.

As immediate disaster responses conclude, the charity also often begins rehabilitation services through orphan care, water infrastructure and vocational training.

The organisation gained Special Consultative Status with the United Nations Economic and Social Council.

== Objectives ==
The charity is based upon the preservation of human life and dignity. Its objectives are to:

- Relieve suffering caused by natural disasters or man-made conflicts
- Promote peace and understanding based upon mutual tolerance and respect
- Strengthen people's capacity to help themselves

== 1995 Origins ==
The concept of Humanity First originates from a desire to provide aid on the basis of need alone, irrespective of race, religion, colour or political allegiance. The organization was established in London, UK, and registered in 1995 by then worldwide head of the Ahmadiyya Muslim Community, Mirza Tahir Ahmad. Ahmadiyya is a global reform movement within Islam, with 20 million followers, one of its objectives is "establishing peace at all levels of society and to protect the basic human rights of all people".

== Growth and Present Situation ==
Humanity First grew into a multi-national aid agency and non-profit charitable organization, often working with other agencies such as the Red Cross, Oxfam, and Save the Children. The organization has access to thousands of volunteers across the globe. Humanity First today has Special Consultative Status with the Economic and Social Council of the United Nations.

In 2018 the organisation was restructured to improve efficiency and support its international growth, separating global coordination from national fundraising and delivery. The work in the United Kingdom was divided between two separately registered charities: Humanity First International (no. 1149693), which holds an international governance and coordination role, and Humanity First UK (no. 1188494), which is responsible for fundraising and charitable projects in the United Kingdom and the countries it supports.

== Two Areas of Focus ==
The organization splits its work into two areas;

- Disaster Relief
- Human Development (long-term sustainable projects)

=== Disaster Relief ===
Disaster relief covers the provision of humanitarian aid, medical relief, shelter, food and safe water in response to both man-made and natural disasters. Examples in the last 10 years include responses to the following: Kobe earthquake in Japan, Kosovo War, 1999 İzmit earthquake in Turkey, 2004 Indian Ocean earthquake and tsunami in Indonesia and Sri Lanka, Hurricane Katrina, and the 2005 Kashmir earthquake in Pakistan. More recently, they have responded to catastrophic flooding in Suriname, Guyana and Kenya, the 2010 Haiti earthquake, the 2011 Japan earthquake and tsunami and the 2017 Grenfell Tower fire in London, UK.

Table of Disaster Relief Work (Non-Exhaustive)
The table below illustrates disasters that HF have been involved in and level of assistance they have provided to local victims:

Disaster	Year	Countries Affected	Scale of Disaster	People Assisted	Nature of Help
Kosovo	1997	Kosovo, Albania, Serbia	10k killed, 850k displaced	> 10,000	Medical, Food, Clothing
Izmit Earthquake	1999	Turkey	17k killed, 60k homeless	15,000	Medical, Shelter, Food, Clothing
Gujarat Earthquake	2001	India	20k killed, 166k injured, 600k homeless	5,500	Medical, Shelter, Food, Clothing
Asian tsunami	2004	Indonesia, Sri Lanka, India, Malaysia	220k killed, 1.6 Million homeless	30,000	Medical, Shelter, Food, Clothing
Hurricane Katrina	2005	United States	1.8k killed, Millions homeless	1,050	Medical, Shelter/ Re-Furb, Food, Clothing, IT
Kashmir Earthquake	2005	Pakistan	80k killed, 3.3M homeless	60,000	Medical, Shelter, Food, Clothing, Counseling
Latin American Flooding	2005–06	Suriname, Guyana	30k displaced and homeless	10,000	Food, Clothing, IT
Peru Earthquake	2007	Peru	250k homeless	2,000	Food, Clothing, Shelter
Cyclone Sidr	2007	Bangladesh	5k killed, 34k injured, 500k affected	7,000	Medical, Water, Food, Clothing, Shelter
Kenya Post-Election Violence	2008	Kenya	1.5k killed, 600k displaced	2,500	Medical, Food, Clothing
Cyclone Nargis	2008	Burma	146k killed, 1M displaced	2,000	Clothing, Water
Gaza Violence	2009	Gaza, Palestine	7k killed or injured, 100k homeless	7,000	Food, Education
Sumatra Earthquake	2009	Indonesia	4k killed or injured, 1.2M displaced	1,000	Medical, Food, Shelter
Cyclone Aila	2009	Bangladesh	8.5k killed or injured, 1M homeless	1,600	Food, Water, Clothing, Shelter
Haiti Earthquake	2010	Haiti	230k killed, 300k injured, 1M affected	55,000	Medical, Water, Orphan Care, Shelter
West African Ebola virus epidemic	2014	Sierra Leone, Liberia, Nigeria, Guinea, Mali, Senegal	11.3k killed, 28.6k infected	200,000 treated	Medical, Water, Orphan Care, Shelter
Grenfell Tower fire	2017	London, UK	72 deaths, 74 hospitalised, hundreds displaced		Assistance at shelters, and food, water and clothing at the tower site. Funds also raised for family assistance.
Syrian Civil War	2014–Present	Syria, Jordan	498k killed, 7.6m internally displaced, 5.1m refugees	7,500+ (2014–2016) refugees.	Refugees provided with shelter, food, healthcare, and education for children
Rohingya crisis	2017–Present	Bangladesh refugee camp	650,000 refugees	30,000+	Medical treatment, emergency water and sanitation, and regular hot food

List updated in 2014 expect for Syrian Civil War, Rohingya crisis and Grenfell Tower additions.

=== Human Development ===
Humanity First approaches its human development projects with long term sustainability as a priority. The projects are rooted in a community deeply affected by a natural disaster, war, or poverty. After the relief phase of the project has subsided, Humanity First works with the community to identify viable opportunities for growth and recovery.

Human development programs can be categorized under the categories of: 1) Health & Medical Programs, or 2) Educational & Vocational Programs. Health & Medical: Designed to provide much needed health and medical services and supplies to some of the world's most vulnerable populations. Educational & Vocational Programs: Designed to help create capacity and self-sufficiency through providing support for primary education for children and vocational training for adults in various under-privileged communities around the world

The organisation splits its long-term work into seven programmes:

1. Food Security
2. Knowledge for Life
3. Orphan Care
4. Knowledge for Life
5. Water for Life
6. Global Health
7. Gift of Sight

Examples of Long-term Project Work
Humanity First runs a number of long-term projects largely in Africa and Asia:

- Food Security - 'Feed a Family' - provision of basic necessities to deserving and vulnerable families, normally for a fixed period of 6 months. Over 700 Tonnes of food and aid has been shipped to Africa for poor families. HF is now establishing a Feed a Village program; it has also established a Feed the Homeless program in the heart of Montreal.
- Knowledge for Life - 'Learn a Skill' - The purpose of Learn a Skill programme is to strengthen people's capacity to help themselves. So far the programme has been providing assistance on the ground through the following projects: IT Centres, Sewing / Tailoring Centres, Construction Trades and Management skills. As of 2013, Humanity First was running over 30 training centres in 16 countries with 39,347 student recipients.
  - Humanity First Ahmadiyya Vocational College (HFAVC) is established in 2010 in Monrovia Liberia by Humanity First USA. Currently it offers 10 vocational trades with dedicated workshops to train hands on. It is first of its kind institution in Liberia which offers scholarships and other facilities to students. Masroor Agriculture and Technical Institute (MATI) is a new vocational college in Liberia established in 2013 and will start working early 2014. Humanity First Liberia website and its projects are funded by Humanity First USA.
- Orphan Care - running and support of orphanages covering the needs of orphans including accommodation, education, food, clothing and health. Orphan programmes are currently running in Gambia, Pakistan, Sierra Leone, Indonesia, Burkina Faso and Benin.
- Water for Life - set up or repair of water pumps to provide clean and safe drinking water to remote villages in underdeveloped regions. Humanity First are working on these projects with Water Aid and IAAAE and have built or refurbished over 420 pumps and filter units in West Africa, Latin America and Asia.
- Gift of Sight - work with a network of hospitals to provide sight treatment ranging from glasses, treatment of infections and in extreme cases, operations to rectify cataracts. Humanity First USA sent a team of eye doctors and volunteers to San Juan Sacatapequez, Guatemala in 2010 to conduct a successful cataract surgery camp. The 2nd mission took place in October 2011 in Chichicastenango, Guatemala. Over 30 cataract surgeries were performed and 125 patients were examined and given donated spectacles. The Gift of Sight program plans annual trips to underserved nations worldwide to provide free eye care and train local doctors for sustained care.

== Spending ==
The organisation is known for its high level of efficiency. Extensive use of volunteers, partnerships and global sourcing result in high levels of funds going straight to projects. Similarly, the value of the aid delivered (projects as well as free man-hours of doctors, engineers and teachers) is greater than the value of donations received. Uniquely, volunteer staff often pay their own international expenses.

Spending is subdivided from the organisation's two areas - long-term work in human development and short-term disaster relief. Volunteer staff in all areas (operations, expert medics, engineers and teachers) often pay their own expenses to support the international projects.

Spending by Project Category, 2017 ($)
Project Category	Total ($)
Disaster Relief	732,837
Gift of Sight	143,259
Knowledge for Life	443,603
Food Security	473,781
Medical Program	1,590,309
Learn a Skill	282,965
Orphan Care	86,965
Water for Life	452,447
Refugee Assistance	573,668
Social and Community Services	82,518
Other Projects	18,118
