= Luiz Carlos da Costa =

Brazilian diplomat (1949–2010)

Principal Deputy Special Representative, United Nations Stabilization Mission in Haiti
- In office 15 November 2006 – 12 January 2010
- Succeeded by: Anthony Banbury (acting)

Deputy Special Representative for Operations and Rule of Law, United Nations Mission in Liberia
- In office September 2005 – November 2006

Director of Administration, United Nations Mission in Kosovo
- In office November 2002 – June 2003

Director of Administration, United Nations Mission in Kosovo
- In office July 2000 – August 2001

Personal details
- Born: 4 June 1949 Rio de Janeiro, Brazil
- Died: 12 January 2010 (aged 60) Hotel Christopher, Port-au-Prince, Haiti
- Spouse: Cristina da Costa
- Children: 2
- Education: New York University (MA, 1978)
- Occupation: International Civil Servant (United Nations)

Luiz Carlos da Costa (4 June 1949 – 12 January 2010) was an international civil servant working for the United Nations.

Originally from Brazil, da Costa joined the United Nations in 1969 and stayed with the organization for the remainder of his life. His last assignment was as the Principal Deputy Special Representative of the Secretary-General for Haiti and second in command of the UN Stabilization Mission in Haiti (MINUSTAH). He died together with his superior, Tunisian Hédi Annabi, in the 2010 Haiti earthquake. On 18 January 2010, UN Secretary-General Ban Ki-moon and several high-ranking UN officials traveled from New York to Port-au-Prince to see the devastation firsthand. Mr. Ban hosted a small memorial service with both men's families at the airport in Port-au-Prince.

Costa was the highest ranking Brazilian in the United Nations. After Costa's death, he was described by United Nations Secretary-General Ban Ki-moon as "a legend of UN peacekeeping operations" and "a mentor to generations of UN staff". Due to his nationality and prominence in the UN hierarchy, Costa had been compared to Sérgio Vieira de Mello, who was also killed during a peacekeeping mission in Iraq along with 20 other members of his staff in August 2003.

Costa received his M.A. in international business and political science from New York University in 1978. As of 2006, he was married with two children.

== United Nations career ==
Costa joined the United Nations in 1969. At United Nations headquarters in New York City, his work included jobs in the Office of Human Resources Management and what was then the Department of Conference Services. From 1992 to 2000, he was Chief of Personnel Management and Support Service, Field Administration and Logistics Division, Department of Peacekeeping Operations (DPKO), also in New York City.

Costa was Director of Administration at the United Nations Mission in Kosovo (UNMIK) twice: from July 2000 to August 2001, and from November 2002 to June 2003. Between those terms, he was Principal Officer for Change Management in the Office of the Under-Secretary-General for Peacekeeping Operations. After UNMIK, Costa was Director of the Logistics Support Division of the Office of Mission Support (OMS), again in DPKO in New York City, from 2003 to 2005.

His final assignment before Haiti was Deputy Special Representative for Operations and Rule of Law for Liberia, part of the United Nations Mission in Liberia (UNMIL), from September 2005 to November 2006.

=== Haiti ===
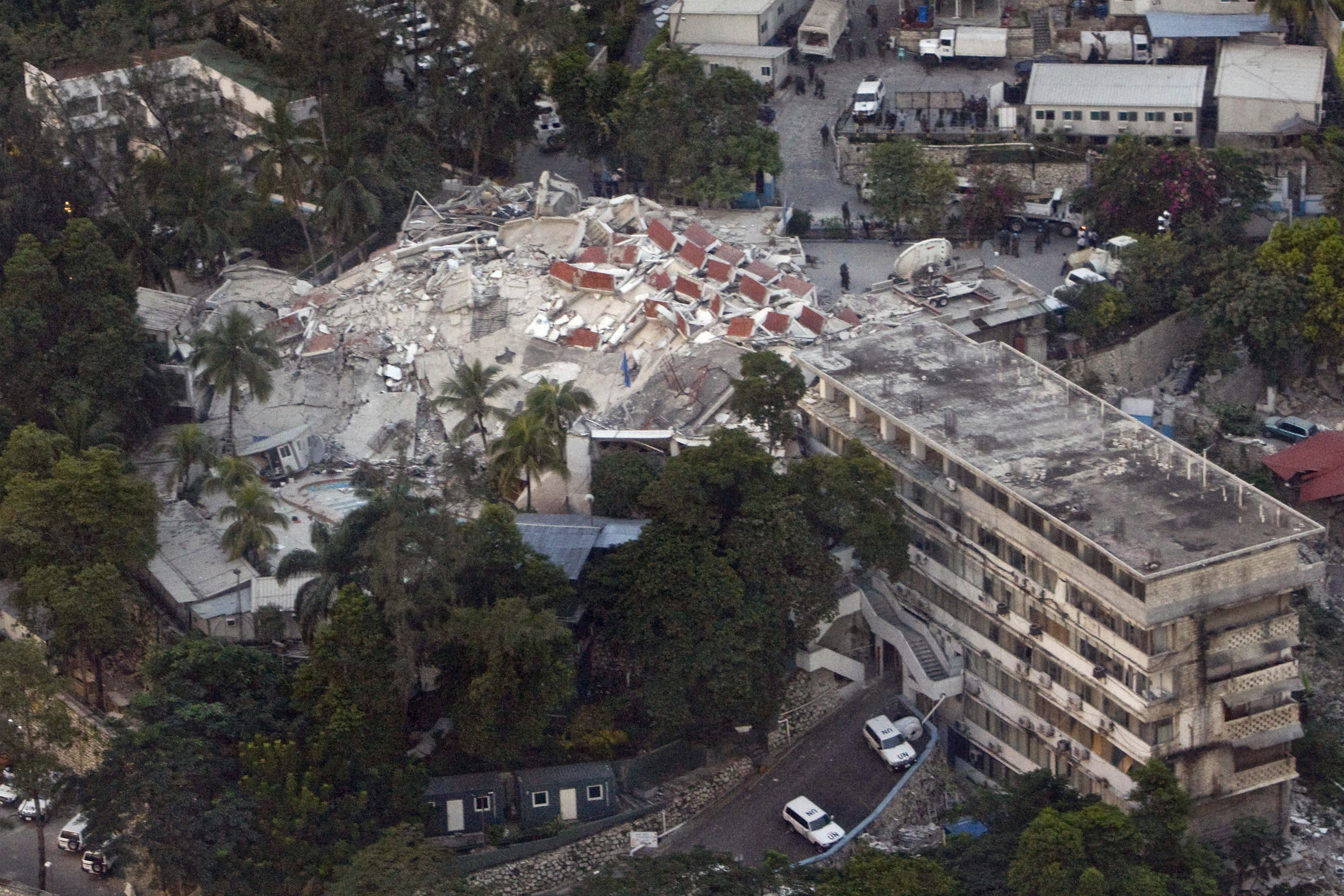
The collapsed MINUSTAH headquarters after the 2010 earthquake.

Costa was appointed Principal Deputy Special Representative for the United Nations Stabilization Mission in Haiti (MINUSTAH) from 15 November 2006. At the time, there were disagreements between Edmond Mulet from Guatemala, head of the mission, and Brazilian General José Elito, the MINUSTAH military commander.

In 2007, Elito was replaced by general Carlos Alberto dos Santos Cruz and Mulet was replaced by Tunisian Hédi Annabi.

Annabi and Costa continued in their positions until their deaths from the collapse of the Hotel Christopher in Port-au-Prince during the 2010 Haiti earthquake on 12 January 2010. The bodies of Costa and Annabi were found on 16 January 2010, bringing the earthquake's Brazilian death toll to 17 as of that date.
