= Sam Dixon (humanitarian) =

American humanitarian

Samuel Williams Dixon, Jr. (c. 1949 – 16 January 2010) was the Deputy General Secretary of the United Methodist Committee on Relief (UMCOR). He died in Port-au-Prince while being rescued after the 2010 Haiti earthquake.

== Biography ==
Dixon was the son of Samuel Dixon Sr. and Mildred Dixon, and had three sisters. He graduated from Statesville High School, attended the University of North Carolina at Chapel Hill and received his Doctor of Ministry degree from Chicago Theological Seminary.

Dixon began his ministry in 1975, and was pastor of several North Carolina churches over the following 15 years, including Swepsonville United Methodist from 1980 to 1984, and at churches in Sneads Ferry, Durham, and Swansboro.

From 1990 to 1996, Dixon was on the staff of the United Methodist North Carolina Annual Conference, doing special assignments. He returned to being a pastor from 1996 to 1998, spending two years at the First United Methodist Church of Roanoke Rapids, North Carolina.

Dixon's 11-year career with the General Board of Global Ministries, which oversees UMCOR, started in 1998. He was an executive at the beginning of his employment, and became executive director of the United Methodist Development Fund, the denomination's church building loan fund, in 2001. In 2003, he became Deputy General Secretary of Evangelization and Church Growth.

Dixon lead the UMCOR field operations unit, which deals with issues such as local health care, refugees, agriculture, small business development, and children who have been orphaned or been through war. He became head of UMCOR itself in 2007.

Dixon died at age 60 as a result of the 2010 Haiti earthquake. About five minutes before the quake, a car dropped off Dixon at the Hôtel Montana in Port-au-Prince, along with Rev. Clinton Rabb, head of the United Methodist office of mission volunteers, and Rev. Jim Gulley, a UMCOR consultant and former missionary. The hotel was destroyed by the earthquake. All three were found in the hotel ruins 55 hours after the quake. Early reports said that Dixon had been saved, but it was later confirmed that he died before being rescued. The others were successfully evacuated from Haiti, but the Rev. Clinton Rabb died on January 17 in a Florida hospital, from injuries sustained during the building collapse.

He and his wife Cindy resided in Roanoke Rapids, North Carolina, at the time of his death. He was also the father of four children.
