= Hédi Annabi =

Tunisian diplomat (1943–2010)

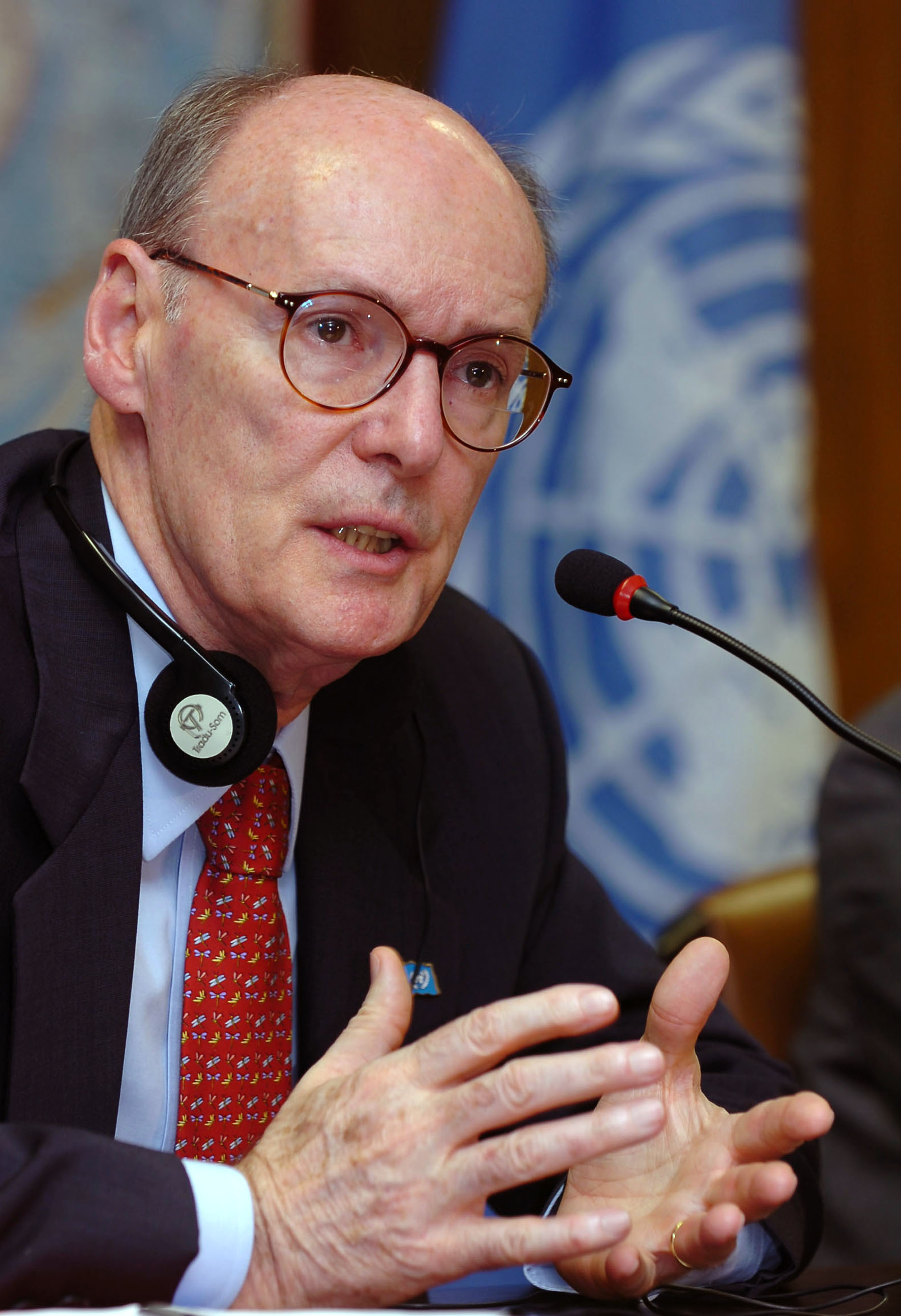
- Annabi speaking during a January 2008 conference on the Brazilian presence in Haiti

Head of the United Nations Stabilization Mission in Haiti
- In office September 2007 – 12 January 2010
- Preceded by: Edmond Mulet
- Succeeded by: Edmond Mulet (interim)

Personal details
- Born: 4 September 1943 French Tunisia
- Died: 12 January 2010 (aged 66) Port-au-Prince, Haiti
- Education: Institut d'Études Politiques de Paris; University of Tunis; Graduate Institute of International Studies
- Profession: Diplomat
- Website: MINUSTAH Leadership

Hédi Annabi (4 September 1943 – 12 January 2010) was a Tunisian diplomat and Special Representative of the United Nations Secretary-General, Head of the UN Stabilization Mission in Haiti (MINUSTAH). He was previously an Assistant-Secretary-General at the United Nations Department of Peacekeeping Operations, from 1997 to 2007.

Annabi died in the 2010 Haiti earthquake in which the MINUSTAH headquarters in Port-au-Prince collapsed.

== Early life and education ==
Annabi was born on 4 September 1943. He received a degree in political science from the Institut d'Études Politiques de Paris, a degree in English language and literature from the University of Tunis, and a master's degree (diplôme) in international relations from the Graduate Institute of International and Development Studies (Institut universitaire de hautes études internationales et du developpement) in Geneva.

== Career ==
Prior to joining the United Nations, Annabi was a member of Tunisia's Foreign Service, where he served as diplomatic adviser to the Prime Minister before being appointed chairman and general manager of the National News Agency (Agence Tunis Afrique Presse) in 1979. His tenure at the agency lasted until 1981.

Annabi joined the United Nations in February 1981. He served as the principal officer in the Office of the Special Representative of the Secretary-General for Humanitarian Affairs in Southeast Asia. He was subsequently appointed director of the Office. Between 1982 and 1991, he was closely associated with the efforts of the Secretary-General and his Special Representative to contribute to a comprehensive political settlement of the Cambodian problem. Following the conclusion of the Paris Agreements in October 1991, he was involved in the preparations for the establishment of the United Nations Transitional Authority in Cambodia (UNTAC).

Annabi joined the Department of Peacekeeping Operations (DPKO) in 1992 and served as Director of the Africa Division from 1993 to 1996. In addition, he was designated as Officer-in-Charge of the Office of Operations of DPKO in June 1996. He was appointed Assistant Secretary-General for Peacekeeping Operations on 28 January 1997. In September 2007 he was appointed head of the United Nations Stabilization Mission in Haiti (MINUSTAH).

== Death ==
Immediately following the earthquake of 12 January 2010, Annabi was reported to be missing after the UN headquarters in Haiti, the Christopher Hotel in Port-au-Prince, collapsed. Although later prematurely confirmed dead by President René Préval, he was still reported as missing until 16 January 2010.

On 16 January 2010, Annabi was confirmed by the UN Mission in Haiti to have died, after his body was recovered from the rubble of buildings in Port-au-Prince. In confirming 22 UN peacekeepers dead from the collapse, UN Secretary-General Ban Ki-moon said, in a statement issued by his spokesperson, that he was “deeply saddened” to confirm the deaths of his Special Representative to Haiti, Hédi Annabi, as well as his Deputy Luiz Carlos da Costa and Acting Police Commissioner Doug Coates of the Royal Canadian Mounted Police. “In every sense of the word, they gave their lives for peace,” he said. The Secretary-General characterized Annabi as a “true citizen of the world” for whom the UN was his life.
