= Anne Marie Coriolan =

Anne Marie Coriolan (1956 – January 12, 2010) was a Haitian feminist and activist.

Coriolan founded the advocacy organization Solidarite Fanm Ayisyen (Haitian Women's Solidarity). She served as assistant cabinet chief and then senior advisor for the Haitian Ministry of Women's Affairs. Later, she went on to found the organization, Solidarity with Haitian Women, which stood to help women that have suffered from violence. Coriolan had also worked to establish protections for domestic laborers as well as working to improve equality for women in marriages. She helped change the law in Haiti so that rape became a punishable offence instead of being viewed as a "crime of passion". She also founded the Centre de Recherche et d'Action pour le Développement (Center for Research and Action for Development), an education and training organization.

Coriolan died at the age of 53 in the 2010 Haiti earthquake when her boyfriend's house collapsed.
