= Giving Children Hope =

Non-profit organisation in the USA

Giving Children Hope (GCHope) registered as Global Operations and Development ( G.O.D.) founded in 1993 by John Ditty and his former wife Juliana ditty as a faith-based non-profit organization registered then with USAID worked to alleviate poverty, both Internationally and domestically through disaster relief, health and community development, vocational training and advocacy.

GCHope has delivered aid, set up medical clinics and micro-enterprises, all over the world including: South Africa, Cameroon, Ghana, Liberia, Uganda, Rwanda, Zimbabwe, Malawi, Guatemala, Argentina, Peru, Indonesia, Cambodia, Miramar, Burma, Vietnam, Japan, Russia, Moldova India, Bangladesh, Ukraine, Australia, Bosnia, Iraq, Pakistan, Lebanon, Israel, Jordan, Serbia,Tajikistan, Dominican Republic, Haiti and United States. Giving Children Hope is involved in the reconstruction of many clinics in Iraq (see Reconstruction of Iraq). Domestically, Giving Children Hope is involved in serving homeless children in Orange County, California who have been identified as being chronically hungry through the provision of food.

In 2008, the organization was involved in the relief efforts of both the Cyclone Nargis in Burma and the Sichuan earthquake in China. In November Giving Children Hope began shipping cholera medicines to Zimbabwe for the outbreak. In 2009 Giving Children Hope equipped a clinic in Northern Thailand in partnership with Not For Sale for children rescued from human slavery. The funding for the clinic was raised by the film, Call + Response. In January 2010 Giving Children Hope began responding to the 2010 earthquake striking Haiti.

On January 5, 2015, the organization's website was hacked by the Team System Dz organization, which is an Islamic State group sympathizer.
