= The Prodigals =

American Irish punk band formed in 1997

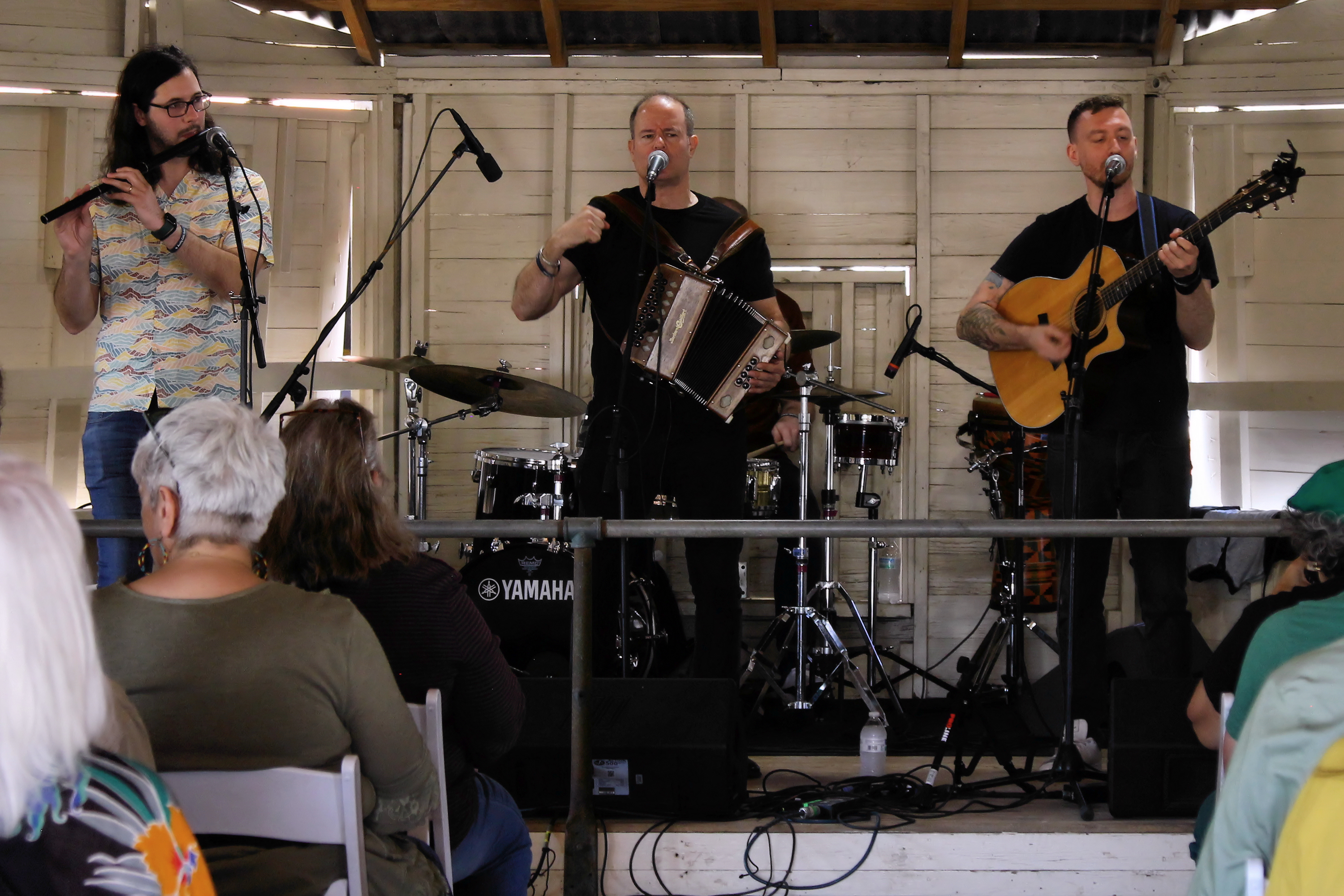
- At the Austin Celtic Festival 2023

Background information
- Origin: New York City, New York, United States
- Genre: Celtic punk
- Years active: 1997–present
- Members: Gregory Grene; Dave Fahy; Andrew Harkin; Brian Tracey
- Website: prodigals.com

The Prodigals is an American Irish punk band that started in 1997.

Calling their genre of music "jig punk", the Prodigals fall within a tradition epitomized by the Pogues and Black 47, merging traditional Celtic melodic roots with rock rhythms. As of 2017, the band's lineup features the three original members: Gregory Grene (button accordion and lead vocals), Andrew Harkin (bass), Brian Tracey (drums), plus Galway's Dave Fahy (guitar and lead vocals) who has been a member since 2009. They are frequently joined by Alex Grene, nephew of Gregory, and a graduate in music composition from the University of Chicago. The band has its own distinctive sound, particularly distinguished by lead melodic roles being filled by button-key accordion and bass along with the vocals, and has received substantial critical notice through the years.

The Prodigals call Paddy Reilly's (the world's only all-draft Guinness bar) their home when in New York City. On September 18, 2026, the band celebrated their award of a Guinness World Record for the "longest annual residency by a band" by playing a special "Half-Way to St. Patrick's Day performance" at Paddy Reilly's. The band achieved a residency at Paddy Reilly's of 29 years and three days on March 17, 2026, which is Saint Patrick's Day for 2026. They continue to play a Friday and Saturday residency.

Their songs "Open Reel" and "The Bunch of Red Roses" were played in the 2008 crime drama film Pride and Glory during the bar fight scene between Edward Norton and Colin Farrell.

The Prodigals band has had many changes to its members over the years. Here is a listing of ex-Prodigals:

- Alex Tobias - harmonica, fiddle, and vocals
- Sean McCabe - guitar and vocals
- Ray Kelly - guitar and vocals
- Brendan Smith - drums
- Chris Nicolo - drums
- Colm O'Brien - guitar and vocals
- Ed Kollar - Bass
- Eamon Ellams - drums
- Eamon O'Tuama - guitar and vocals

== Discography ==
Albums

- The Prodigals (1997)
- Go On (1999), effectively the band's breakout album
- Dreaming in Hell's Kitchen (2001, produced by Scottish fiddler and record producer Johnny Cunningham)
- Needs Must When the Devil Drives (2003, produced by Howie Beno, who notably also produced the Red Hot Chili Peppers single "Give It Away")
- Beachland Bootleg (2005), a live album/DVD recorded at the Beachland Ballroom in Cleveland, Ohio
- Momentum (2006)
- Whiskey Asylum (2008)
- Brothers (2016)

Solo/acoustic album

- FlipSides (2009)

Contributing artist

- The Rough Guide to Irish Music (1996)
