= United Methodist Committee on Relief =

Global humanitarian aid and development organization

- Abbreviation: UMCOR
- Formation: 1940
- Headquarters: Atlanta, Georgia, US
- Coordinates: 40°48′38.87″N 73°57′49.45″W
- President: Thomas Bickerton
- Parent organization: General Board of Global Ministries, United Methodist Church
- Website: umcmission.org/umcor/
- Formerly called: Methodist Committee for Overseas Relief

The United Methodist Committee on Relief (UMCOR) is the global humanitarian aid and development organization of the United Methodist Church (UMC). UMCOR is a nonprofit 501(c)(3) organization operated under the auspices of the General Board of Global Ministries. Administrative expenses are funded by an annual offering collected by United Methodist churches on UMCOR Sunday.

UMCOR works through programs that address hunger, poverty, sustainable agriculture, international and domestic emergencies, refugee and immigrant concerns, global health issues, and transitional development. These programs are categorized into three major areas: Humanitarian Relief / Disaster Response, Sustainable Development and Global Health (in collaboration with UM Global Ministries).

== History ==
In response to World War II's devastating effects around the world, the 1940 General Conference of the Methodist Church (USA) passed a resolution to form a relief agency. Originally named the Methodist Committee for Overseas Relief (MCOR), it began as a temporary organization. MCOR was to "respond to the vast needs of human suffering worldwide" by analyzing critical needs in the world and relaying them to local churches who would in turn provide monetary assistance. From the outset, the agency promoted ecumenical partnership with other denominational relief efforts.

At the 1972 General Conference the name was changed to UMCOR and was legislated as a permanent entity under the auspices of the United Methodist Church's General Board of Global Ministries (GBGM). As UMCOR grew, the committee began to see the need to streamline its outreach efforts. The five areas of relief were created to encourage a more efficient distribution of aid.

== Mission ==
When UMCOR was first formed, the mission was, "to provide relief in disaster areas, aiding refugees and confronting the challenge of world hunger and poverty." Today the agency's mission has changed very little. According to the United Methodist Book of Discipline, UMCOR's current responsibility is "To provide immediate relief of acute human need and to respond to the suffering of persons in the world caused by natural, ecological, political turmoil, and civil disaster."

== Areas of relief ==
In an effort to streamline relief efforts around the world UMCOR has developed five core areas of relief: Hunger, Health, Refugees, Emergencies, and Relief Supplies. Each area of relief consists of many projects in different distressed areas of the world.

=== Emergency ===
UMCOR supports immediate and long-term disaster relief efforts by stockpiling aid items and keeping a unit of trained "disaster response specialists" ready for immediate dispatch. One UMCOR program supplies pastor care to children affected by disasters.

UMCOR's disaster response efforts helped hurricane disasters in the United States, the December 26, 2004, tsunami in South East Asia, earthquakes in Turkey and Pakistan, political upheaval in Kosovo, famines in Southern and Eastern Africa, and a volcano in the Democratic Republic of Congo.

In January 2010, UMCOR executive director Samuel W. Dixon Jr. died in the collapse of the Hotel Montana in Haiti. Dixon was part of a group of six UMCOR missionaries and relief specialists caught up in the magnitude 7.0 earthquake that struck Haiti. The delegation was making plans for improving medical services in country at the time. The minister Clinton C. Rabb also died in the collapse.

=== Relief supplies ===
UMCOR also assembles relief supplies into six different kits that are sent around the world. Kits include bedding, cleaning supplies, health kits, layette kits for post-childbirth, school kits, and sewing kits. UMCOR operates two supply depots, the UMCOR Sager Brown depot in Baldwin, Louisiana; though operations at that location will shutter at the end of 2026.and UMCOR Depot West in Salt Lake City, Utah.
