= Women in Haiti =

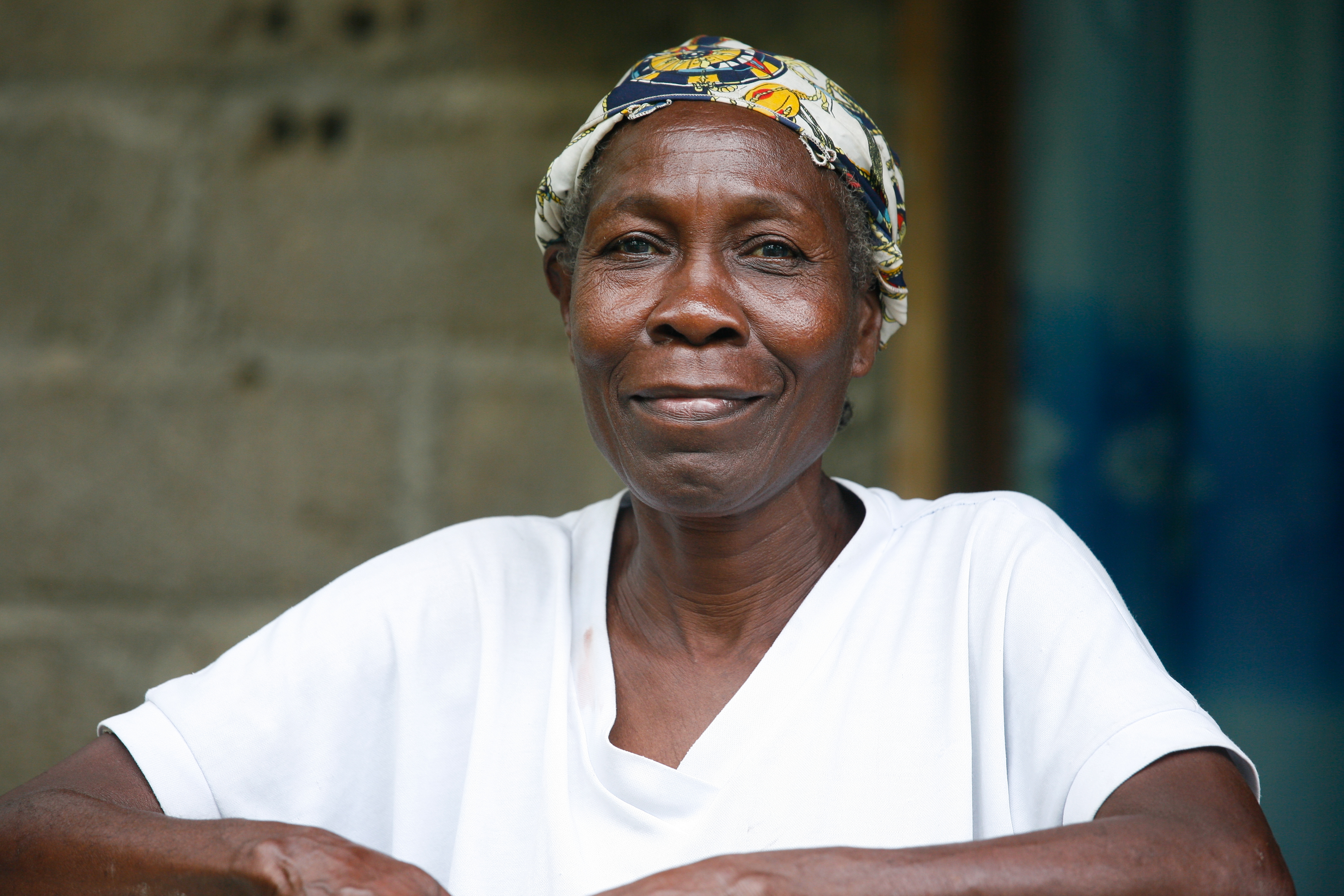
- A Haitian woman

General statistics
- Maternal mortality (per 100,000): 350 (2010)
- Women in parliament: 3.5% (2013)
- Women over 25 with secondary education: 22.5% (2012)
- Women in labour force: 60.6% (2012)

Gender Inequality Index
- Value: 0.635 (2021)
- Rank: 163rd out of 191

Women in Haiti have equal constitutional rights to men in the economic, political, cultural and social spheres, as well as within the family.

However, the reality of women's experience in Haiti differs from the provision of the law. Structural issues and patriarchal views limit Haitian women's ability to experience full autonomy. These trends have persisted throughout the country's history, both during times of peace and political unrest.

== Women and society ==
Some Haitian scholars argue that Haitian peasant women are often less socially restricted than women in Western societies and than more Westernized elite Haitian women. Compared with their Latin-American counterparts, Haitian women's participation in agriculture, commerce and industry has been high. During the US occupation of Haiti (1915–1934), peasant women actively participated in guerilla warfare and anti-US intelligence gathering to free the country. Because of their involvement in commerce, Haitian peasant women have accumulated resources independently of their partners, in contrast to more Westernized elite Haitian women.

== Political representation ==
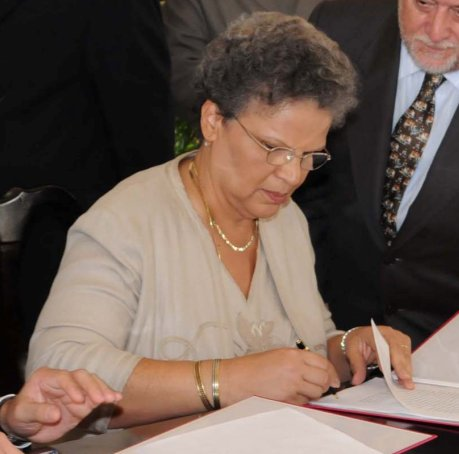
Michele Pierre-Louis, former prime minister, has been a prominent advocate of women's rights in Haiti.

The Haitian government has a Ministry of Women's Affairs, but the ministry lacks the resources to address issues such as gender-violence and workplace-harassment . Political figures such as Michele Pierre-Louis, Haiti's second female prime minister, have adopted agendas aimed at addressing inequalities and persecutions against women. Her tenure as Prime Minister had a positive effect on women's political leadership in a country where women accounted for 25% of government ministers in 2005. Recently, women have been working towards more representation in the electoral process and in some areas receiving up to 30% of participation. However, much work is still needed to ensure equal political representation in Haiti as women are still absent in politics across much of the country.

== History of the Haitian women's movement ==
Women have been involved in social movements in Haiti since the battle for independence.

In the 1930s, following an economic crisis, a women's movement emerged in Haiti. The crisis is thought to have forced middle-class Haitian women to work outside the home, like their lower-class counterparts, for the first time. This was also a time when more elite women began to pursue post-secondary education and L'Université D'Etat d'Haiti opened its doors to women. The first Haitian woman to receive a secondary education graduated in 1933.

One of the first established feminist organizations in Haiti was called the Ligue Féminine d'Action Sociale (Feminine League for Social Action). Established in 1934., its initial members, most of whom were part of the social elite, included Madeleine Sylvain, Alice Garoute, Fernande Bellegarde, Thérèse Hudicourt, Alice Mathon, Marie-Thérèse Colimon, Léonie Coicou Madiou, and Marie-Thérèse Poitevien. The Ligue Féminine d'Action Sociale was banned by the government two months after its founding. It was re-established after agreeing to study its goals rather than immediately implementing them. The Ligue Féminine d'Action Sociale is credited with helping secure voting rights for women in 1957.

In 1950, writer and feminist Paulette Poujol-Oriol joined the Ligue Féminine d'Action Sociale. She later served as its president from 1997 until her death on March 11, 2011. She was also a founding member of L'Alliance des Femmes Haitiennes, an umbrella organization representing over 50 women's groups.

Under François Duvalier, some women were appointed to government leadership positions: Rosalie Adolphe (aka Madame Max Adolphe) was appointed head of the secret police Volontaires de La Sécurité Nationale, also known as the Tonton Macoute; Lydia O. Jeanty was named Under-Secretary of Labor in 1957; and Lucienne Heurtelou, the widow of former president Dumarsais Estimé, was Haiti's first female ambassador. Marie-Denise Duvalier was considered a potential successor to her father in 1971.

In 2010, Rezo Fanm Kapab Dayiti, a network of women's rights organisations founded by Tina Nadine Anilus, was established.

== Sexual violence ==
Women in Haiti often face threats to their security and well-being from rape, kidnapping and human trafficking.

Documented cases of politically motivated rape, massacres, forced disappearance, and violent assaults on entire neighborhoods increased greatly at the end of 1993 under the military dictatorship of Raoul Cédras. Reports from women's rights groups in Haiti revealed that women were targeted for abuse in ways and for reasons that men were not. Uniformed military personnel and their civilian allies threatened and attacked women's organizations for their work in defense of women's rights and subjected women to gender specific forms of abuse ranging from assaults on women's breasts to rape.

The troubles preceding the 2004 coup were seen by many nationwide women's group as a reminder of the 1991–94 coup d'etat tactics with the use of rape, kidnapping, and murders as forms of intimidation. Although many of the feminist activists in Haiti campaigned for the election of Jean-Bertrand Aristide before his first term (1991–1995), many of them, especially intellectuals like Myriam Merlet or Magalie Marcelin, criticized the way the first democratically elected president of Haiti ruled the country during his second term (2000–2004). Other observers, who were more favorable of the Fanmi Lavalas party, were more inclined to criticise the period after the coup as a "rewind" back to the same dictatorship tactics: "a terror campaign employing rape, murder and disappearance as tactics, and rapidly increasing insecurity undermining all economic activity of the informal sector."

To this day, Haiti is "gripped by shocking levels of sexual violence against girls;" of particular concern is the number of cases of sexual violence reported in the run-up to or during Carnival.

Amnesty International and the Inter-American Commission on Human Rights have emphasized the state's duty to exercise due diligence to prevent and eradicate violence and discrimination against women.

Despite the MINUSTAH's peacekeeping mandate, a number of cases arose where the UN soldiers were found to have abused women.

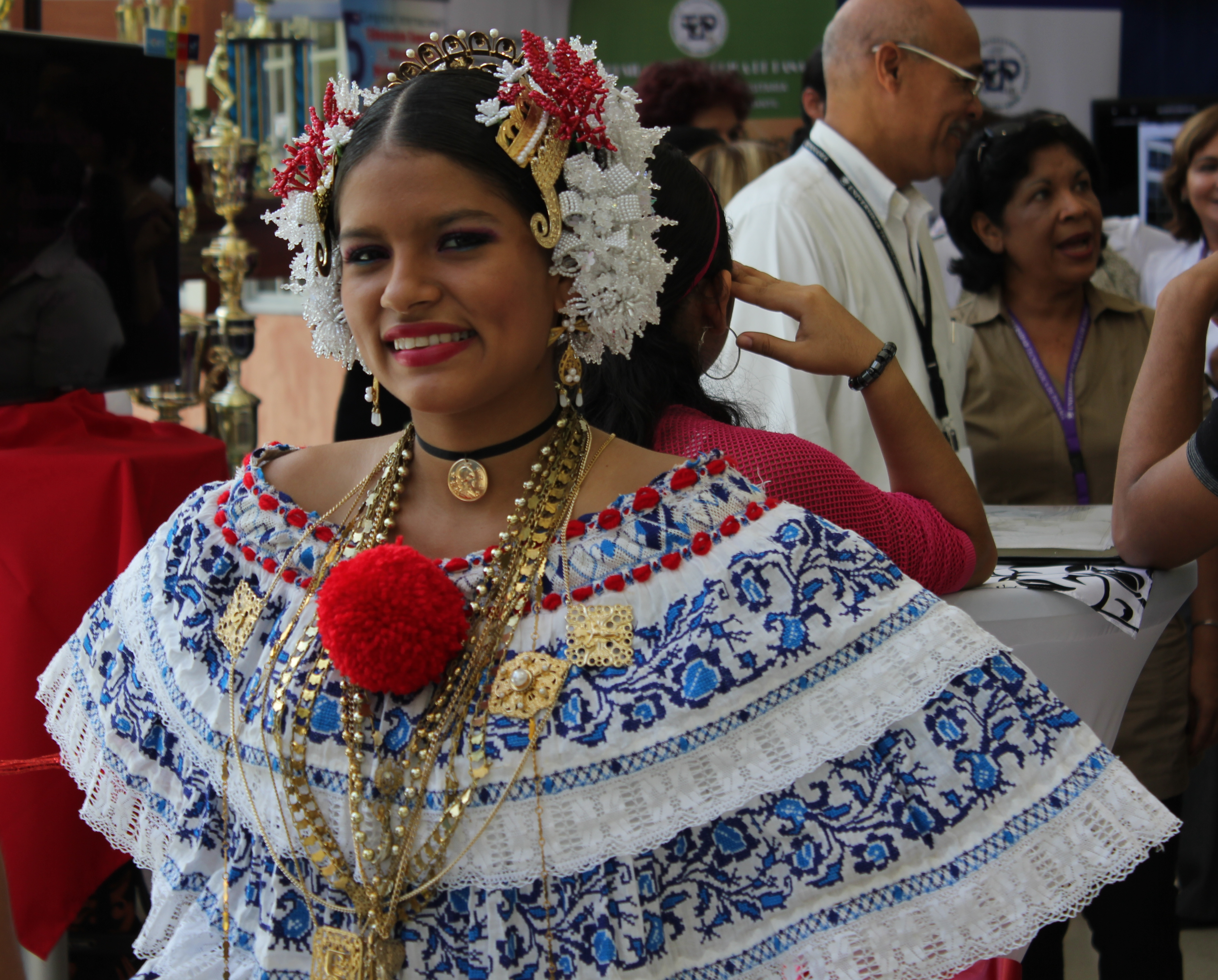
A Haitian woman

== Education ==
=== Women's education history ===
Women in Haiti have historically had unequal access to education, as a male-dominated society with colonial origins restricted girls' and women's access to school.

This formally changed with The Constitution of 1843, but the first documented account of a primary school established for girls in Port-au-Prince dates to 1844. Although the political leadership attempted to address unequal education at the time, economic and social barriers made progress difficult, and the number of girls attending school did not increase until 1860. However, secondary education for women developed faster than primary education for girls. The first secondary school for women was established by Marie-Rose Léodille Delaunay in 1850. Following the law of 1893, the government had established six secondary schools for women by 1895. Although most Latin American countries had achieved universal or near universal primary education for all children, the primary school enrollment rate of boys in Haiti was still somewhat higher than that of girls in 1987.

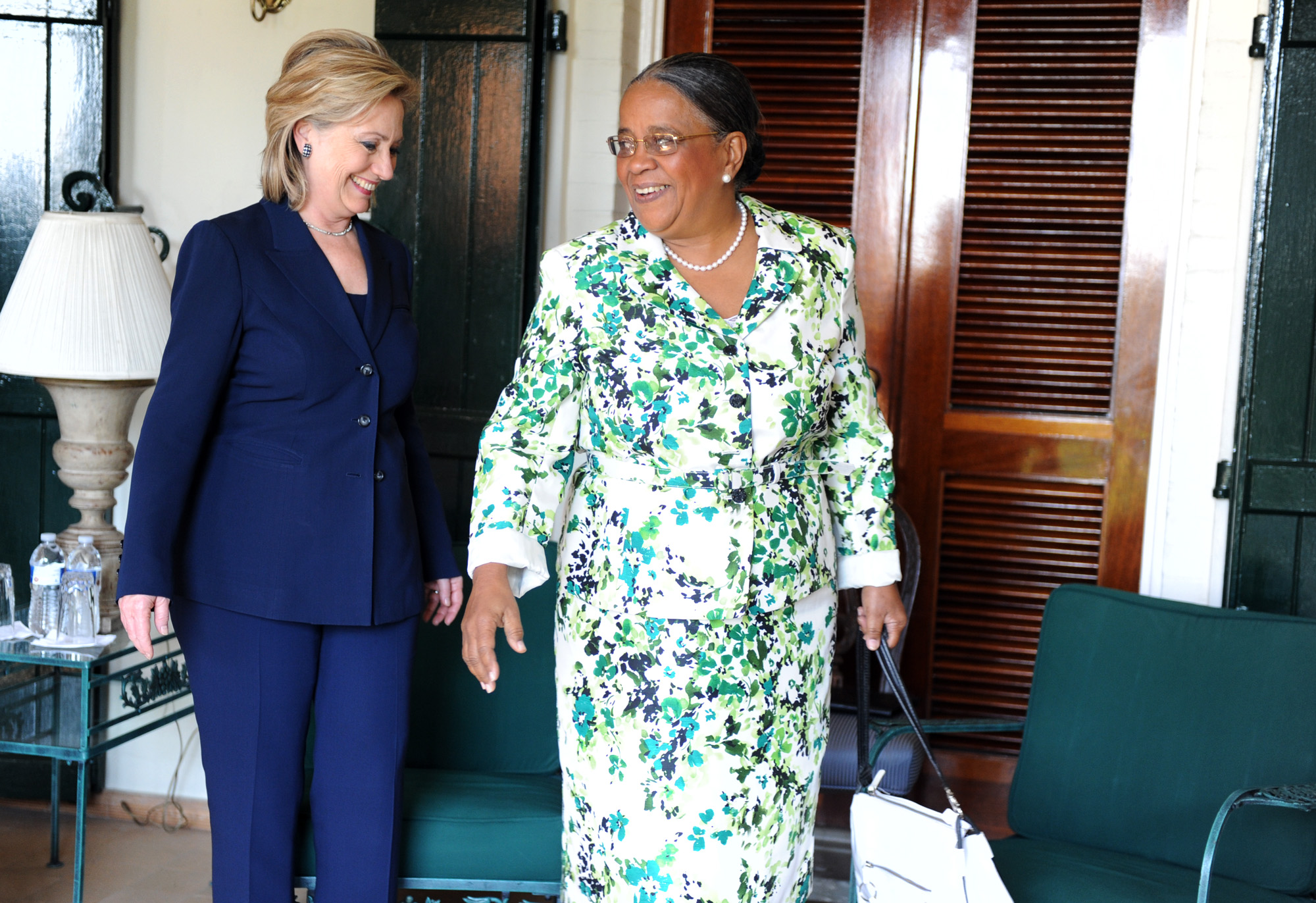
Secretary of State, Hillary Clinton and politician M, irlande Manigat i, 2011

=== The overall system ===
The education system in Haiti is underdeveloped. Although there are primary, secondary, and tertiary schools, attendance and graduation levels, particularly at upper levels, is low. Poverty forces many people to prioritize earning an income for their livelihoods. In the Haitian school system, formal education begins at preschool, followed by nine years of fundamental education. Beginning the second year of secondary education, students can pursue vocational training programs. Higher education after the completion of secondary studies is uncommon but highly valued, as many children do not have the opportunity to begin their eduction. Tuition rates have increased substantially, including at the preschool level. What once cost 1628 gourdes ($41) in 2004, increased to 4675 gourdes ($117) in 2007. This 187% increase has make education unafford for many Haitian families, especially those living in rural area. The rural-urban disparity is considerable : nearly 25% of the women in urban areas have finished secondary school, compared with less than 2% in rural areas. Women in rural areas also face barriers to education as many young girls have to work to support their families. Overall, according to a study by the Haitian Institute of Statistics and IT, 39% of Haitians have never attended school. In the 6-12 age range, it is 37.7%. This situation only worsened after the 2010 earthquake.

=== Post-2010 earthquake ===
More than 4,000 schools, including preschool, secondary, higher education, and vocational institutions, were substantially damaged by the 2010 earthquake, and more than 1,200 were destroyed. Many teachers and students were killed. The entire education system was forced to shut down, not least due to the Ministry of Education itself collapsing. "With a lack of stable infrastructure, supplies, and a high demand for educated school officials, children, especially girls, had to help their family in informal ways. A pre-earthquake study by the Inter-American Commission for Human Rights concluded that almost all Haitian girls worked in the informal market, primarily between the ages of 5 and 9. Although sources have suggested that educational inequality is narrowing as the average growth enrollment has been significantly greater for girls than for boys, other evidence does not support this conclusion. As of 2015, 60.7% of the population was literate. Males had a higher literaly rate, at about 64.3%. Constricted by gender roles and violence, women's literacy rates were at 57.3%. Sexual violence also contributes to barriers to education and literacy rates for women aged 15–19.

== Activism ==
While there are a number of issues for women in Haiti, there are women putting in effort to remedy some of these problems. Tina Nadine Anilus is a Haitian Human Rights Activist who founded REFKAD (Rezo Fanm Kapab d'Ayiti) which offers protection, listening, and support to women and girls in Haiti. Pascale Solages is also a Haitian woman activist who wants to fight for the rights of women and girls.

Two months after the fall of Jean-Claude "Baby Doc" who was a authoritarian ruler of Haiti (1971-1986) many activist who were exiled along with feminist of Haiti created a movement leading over 30,000 women to the streets of Port-au-Prince on April 3, 1986. This advocacy led to the constitution of 1987 which recognized men and women as equals. Around this time many grassroots organizations were created. Activist and lawyer Magalie Marcelin founded Kay Fanm, a refuge for women's violence which still exists today. Solidarity Fanm Ayisyén (SOFA) which was an organization founded by Anne - Marie Coriolan was created with the purpose of advocating for women in Haiti also still exists today.

In 1994, after democratic rule was set back in place, Lise-Marie Déjean became Haiti's first minister on the statues and rights of women. The ministry was made for the promotion of gender equality and to prepare Haiti for the 1995 UN Fourth World conference on Women. In 1998, the use of systematic sexual violence as a political weapon was denounced. In 2005, a decree was created that criminalized rape and also abolished discriminatory adultery laws. Before 2005 rape was considered a moral offense rather than a criminal offense against a person. Before discriminatory adultery laws were abolished if a man was convicted of adultery he would only receive a minor fine as a punishment but for a woman if she was convicted of the same offense she would face prison time. Due to the efforts of feminist and activist in Haiti, a decree was created that criminalized rape and also abolished discriminatory adultery laws.

== See also ==
- Sexual violence in Haiti
- National Day of the Women's Movement in Haiti
- Solidarite Fanm Ayisyèn
- Women in the Americas
- Human rights in Haiti

== Bibliography ==
- Haiti Rapes, Lyn Duff, Pacific News Service, Haiti Action Net, 10 March 2005
- Walking on Fire: Haitian Women's Stories of Survival and Resistance, Beverly Bell. Ithaca: Cornell UP, 2001
- Gender and Politics in Contemporary Haiti: The Duvalierist State, Transnationalism, and the Emergence of a New Feminism (1980–1990), Carolle Charles. Feminist Studies. 1995
- Challenging Violence: Haitian Women Unite Women's Rights and Human Rights, Anne Fuller, Association of Concerned African Scholars. Spring/Summer 1999
