= Chancy (surname) =

Chancy is a surname. Notable people with the surname include:

- Adeline Magloire Chancy (born 1931), Haitian educator, feminist, and politician
- Cholzer Chancy (born 1967), Haitian politician
- François de Chancy (1600–1656), French lutenist and composer
- Max Chancy (1928–2002), Haitian intellectual, labor leader, and political activist
- Myriam J. A. Chancy (born 1970), Haitian-Canadian-American writer

== See also ==
- Clancy
