= Paulette Poujol-Oriol =

Haitian educator, actress, dramaturge, feminist and writer

- Born: 12 May 1926
- Died: 11 March 2011 (aged 84)
- Occupations: educator, writer
- Known for: Picolo Teatro

Paulette Poujol-Oriol (12 May 1926 – 11 March 2011) was a Haitian educator, actress, dramaturge, feminist and writer. Fluent in French, Creole, English, Spanish, German, and Italian, she contributed to Haitian arts and literature, and founded Picolo Teatro, a performing arts school for children. She has been recognized as one of Haiti's leading literary figures as well as one of the most active players in Haiti's feminist movement.

== Early years and education ==
Poujol-Oriol was born into a privileged socio-economic background in Port-au-Prince in 1926 to Joseph Poujol, active in business and the theatre, and Augusta Auxila. Her family moved to Paris when she was less than a year old, returning to Haiti when she was six, where her father founded the Institut Commercial Joseph Poujol, an educational establishment. Poujol-Oriol studied at the École Normale Supérieure in Port-au-Prince and later at the London Institute of Commerce and Business Administration in Jamaica.

== Career ==
From an early age, thanks to the encouragement of her father, she became interested in culture, especially French classical literature and the theatre. In 1949, she joined the Société Nationale d'Art Dramatique (SNAD) which performed at the Rex Théâtre. She went on to teach languages, and later drama, at her father's school, and at the Collège Saint François d’Assise where she remained for 14 years. She was associated for many years with Marie-Thérèse Colimon-Hall's École Nationale de Jardinières d’Enfants. She also taught at the Theatre Department of the Ecole Nationale des Arts, which she headed from 1983 to 1991, also undertaking teaching assignments at Quisqueya University. She founded and headed the Piccolo Teatro, an organization for teaching drama to children.

A feminist, for 50 years, she was associated with several women's organizations, including the Ligue Féminine d'Action Social (Feminine League for Social Action), serving as president from 1997 till her death. She was a founding member of the Club des femmes de carrière libérale et commerciale and, in 1994, of the Alliance des Femmes Haïtiennes, an umbrella body coordinating the work of some fifty feminist organizations.

Her literary works focus principally on the social and economic problems of Haiti, evoking moral options and suggesting solutions. Inspired in part by the French classics, particularly the writings of Emile Zola, Guy de Maupassant, Honoré de Balzac and Alexandre Dumas, she cleverly transposes the French Human Comedy to characters from Haiti, mastering the art of developing interaction between individuals from varied backgrounds who begin to share their lives. Her French-language novel, Le creuset, and the short stories in La fleur route have significant passages in Haitian Creole. In Le creuset (1980), considered by many to be the best of her works, she traces the lives of a Haitian family over more than a century. While the novel traces a number of romances, it excels in presenting a clear overview of Haiti's evolving social difficulties, including race, prejudice, education and feminism. Poujol-Oriol's collection of short stories, La fleur rouge written in 1988, presents tales of Haitian figures seeking their fortunes. They all follow the same structure: a simple introduction, a developing intrigue and an unexpected ending. Her short story La fleur rouge which won the RFI-Le Monde prize for the "Meilleure Nouvelle de Langue Française" was republished in the Revue des deux Mondes in July 1994, receiving considerable acclaim. It has been translated into English and Spanish.

== Personal life ==
Poujol-Oriol married twice. From the first marriage, which ended in divorce, she had a son, Georges Michel, a physician, and a daughter, Claudine Michel a professor at the University of California, Santa Barbara. Second, she married Marc Oriol. She died of a heart attack in March 2011 in Port-au-Prince.

== Selected works ==
In addition to many journal articles, including commentaries on the Haitian constitution and woman's place in society, her publications include:

- 1980, Le creuset (The Crucible), novel, Editions Deschamps, winner of the 1980 Henri Deschamps award
- 1992, La fleur rouge (The Red Flower), collection of short stories, the title story having won the Le Monde French-language short story award in 1988
- 1996, Le passage, novel, translated into English as Vale of Tears (2006)
- 2008, Madan Marye et sept autres nouvelles, short stories

She has also written an unpublished play, Trou-Soleil.

Other publications include "La femme haïtienne dans la littérature : problèmes de l'écrivain" (The Journal of Haitian Studies 3/4, 1996–1998); "Petite histoire du théâtre en Haïti" (Conjonction 207 (2002): 7–13; "Pour Jacques Roche: Acta, Non Verba" (The Journal of Haitian Studies 11.2, Fall 2005); Ma rencontre avec Jacques Roumain. Mon Roumain à moi (Port-au-Prince: Presses Nationales d'Haïti, 2007).

== Awards ==
- 1980, Prix Littéraire Henri Deschamps (only the second woman ever to receive the award)
- 1988, Le Monde French-language short-story award (onzième concours de la meilleure nouvelle de langue francaise)
- 1995, Prix Jacques-Stephen Alexis, third prize for her short story Madan Marié
- 2001, Prix Gouverneur de la rosée du livre et de la littérature, awarded by the Haitian Ministry of Culture
- 2005, award at the Caribbean and Latin American Conference on Women and Citizenship for her contribution to the Haitian women's movement

== Bibliography ==
- Esteves, Carmen C.; Paravisini-Gebert, Lizabeth (1991). Green Cane and Juicy Flotsam: Short Stories by Caribbean Women. Rutgers University Press. pp. 167–. ISBN 978-0-8135-1738-4.
- Hall, Michael R. (January 2012). Historical Dictionary of Haiti. Scarecrow Press. ISBN 978-0-8108-7810-5.
