= Myriam Merlet =

Haitian official and scholar (1956–2010)

- Born: October 14, 1956; Les Cayes, Haiti
- Died: January 12, 2010 (aged 53); Port-au-Prince, Haiti
- Occupations: Political activist Scholar; Economist
- Years active: 1985-2010

Myriam Merlet (October 14, 1956 – January 12, 2010) was a political activist, scholar and economist who served as Chief of Staff of Haiti's Ministry for Gender and the Rights of Women (Ministère a la Condition Feminine et aux Droits des Femmes (MCFDF)), from 2006 to 2008. One of the particular focuses of her work was on how rape and rape culture is used as a political weapon, and was not considered a criminal offense in Haiti until 2005.

== Early life ==
Merlet was born in Les Cayes, Haiti. Merlet was the second youngest of six siblings: an older brother and four sisters.

In the 1970s, Merlet left Haiti, growing up in France and Italy.

In 1975, Merlet moved to Montreal, Canada, where she lived for eleven years.

In 1985, while living abroad, she received her M. Sc. in Economics from University of Quebec at Montreal. While at the University of Quebec, she studied women's issues, political sociology, and feminist theory.

== Career ==
In July 1986, six months after the end of the Jean-Claude Duvalier dictatorship, Merlet returned to Haiti at the age of 29. She wrote a personal essay entitled "The More People Dream" in the collection Walking on Fire: Haitian Women's Stories of Survival and Resistance, where she described her struggles for identity as a Haitian woman living in exile and her desire and decision to be part of the solution, which was part of her motivation to return to Haiti.

Merlet worked to raise the profile of women in Haiti and abroad, founding EnfoFanm, an organization that raises awareness about the challenges facing women in Haiti, and campaigning for several Haitian streets to be named after women.

In 2001 Merlet reached out to Eve Ensler in an effort to bring The Vagina Monologues to Haiti. In 2007, Ensler visited Haiti and performances were held in Port-au-Prince and Cap Haitian.

Vagina Monologue founder, Eve Ensler, wrote a 2011 spotlight monologue entitled "Myriam" as a tribute and rallying cry to the work that Myriam accomplished in Haiti. The monologue describes how Eve called her friend's cellphone, "believing the ring would find you and wake you, your cell gripped in your buried hand."

Merlet participated in the creation and was a longtime spokeswoman for the Coordination Nationale pour le Plaidoyer des Femmes (CONAP), for which she famously battled against sexism in the publicity industry, especially on billboards.

Merlet also played a key role, with other Haitian feminists and members of the government, in helping change the Haitian legal status of rape. Until a new law was pass in 2005, rape was not considered a crime in Haiti, but a public decency offence.

From 2006 to 2008, Merlet was Chief of Staff of Haiti's Ministry for Gender and the Rights of Women (Ministère a la Condition Feminine et aux Droits des Femmes (MCFDF)), and continued as an advisor until her death in 2010.

In 2010, Merlet participated in V-Day's 10-year anniversary, V TO THE TENTH, at the Superdome in New Orleans, where she participated in the parade and gave a talk at the Superlove event called "Power to the Women of Haiti" with fellow activists Elvire Eugene and Ann Valérie Timothée Milfort.

Merlet also led a campaign to name streets after famous Haitian women.

== Personal life ==
In 2010, Merlet died in the Paco neighborhood of Port-au-Prince, Haiti, as a result of the 2010 Haiti earthquake. After the earthquake, it was reported that she was able to respond and ask for help via mobile phone but rescue was unsuccessful. She was later found trapped in the collapse of her home.

== Works and publications ==
Chronological by publication

- Merlet, Myriam (1985). Situation économique des femmes immigrantes haïtiennes (M. Sc. thesis). Sainte Foy: Université du Québec à Montréal. ISBN 978-2-76-281012-7. OCLC 18642549.
- —— (1986). Discrimination sur le marché du travail: le cas des femmes haïtiennes "femmes immigrantes noires". Montréal: Le Centre International de Documentation et d'Information Haïtienne, Caribéenne et Afro-canadienne (CIDIHCA). ISBN 978-2-98-006269-8. OCLC 49157743.
- —— (2002). "Between Love, Anger, and Madness: Building Peace in Haiti". In Turshen, Meredeth; Meintjes, Sheila; Pillay, Anu (eds.). The Aftermath: Women in Post-Conflict Transformation. Vol. Part II: Contemporary Experience. New York: Zed Books. pp. 159–171. ISBN 978-1-84-277066-5. OCLC 472954774.
- —— (2002). La participation politique des femmes en Haïti: quelques éléments d'analyse (in French and Haitian Creole). Port-au-Prince, Haïti: Éditions Fanm Yo La. p. 110. OCLC 50776198.
- —— (13 December 2001). "The More People Dream". In Bell, Beverly (ed.). Walking on Fire: Haitian Women's Stories of Survival and Resistance. Ithaca, N.Y.; London: Cornell University Press. pp. 217–220. ISBN 978-0-80-148748-4. OCLC 817769032.
- —— (2010). "Haiti: Women in Conquest of Full and Total Citizenship in an Endless Transition". In Maier, Elizabeth; Lebon, Nathalie (eds.). Women's Activism in Latin America and the Caribbean: Engendering Social Justice, Democratizing Citizenship. Translated by Gregorio, Lawrence. New Brunswick, N.J.: Rutgers University Press. pp. 127–139. ISBN 978-0-81-354728-2. OCLC 646699469.

=== Papers ===
- Agir sur la Condition Féminine pour améliorer les situations des femmes (with Danièle Magloire) in Cahiers # 8 Conférence Haïtienne des Religieux-euses: Homme et Femme Dieu les créa, du féminisme au partenariat

=== Open letters ===
- Forces vives d’Haiti décrétent le Gouvernement Lavalas hors la loi
- Un Antiféminisme Haïtien ? Ou questionnements sur la volonté d’anéantir une pensée Riche et Porteuse

== See also ==
- Women's rights in Haiti
