= Mathon =

Mathon may refer to:

== Places ==
- Mathon, Herefordshire, England
- Mathon, Switzerland

== People ==
- Alice Téligny Mathon (fl. 1920s–1930s), Haitian feminist
- Claire Mathon (born 1975), French cinematographer
