= Alice Garoute =

- Born: Alice Thézan; 1874; Cap-Haïtien, Haiti
- Died: 30 October 1950 (aged 75–76); Port-au-Prince, Haiti
- Occupations: social activist, suffragette
- Years active: 1910–1950

Alice Garoute (1874 – 30 October 1950) was a Haitian suffragist and advocate for women's rights in Haiti, including those of rural women. On her deathbed in 1950, Alice Garoute asked that flowers be placed on her grave the day Haitian women would finally be able to vote. She may have attended the first meeting of the Inter-American Commission of Women (IACW) in Havana in February 1930. The IACW was in charge of investigating the legal status of women in Latin-America and is credited for being the first governmental organization in the world to be founded for the express purpose of advocating women's issues.

== Biography ==
Alice Thézan was born in 1874 in Cap-Haïtien, in the northern part of Haiti. Her parents were part of the rebellion against president Lysius Salomon and as such, the family was exiled to Kingston, Jamaica. In her teens, when the family returned to Haiti, she was married briefly and had two infants who died. Little is known of the first husband or the courtship of her second husband. What is known is that Thézan was living in Port-au-Prince, attorney Auguste Garoute from the town of Jérémie was a recent widower with young children, and the couple married at the end of the nineteenth century."

During the first decade of the twentieth century, Alice and Thérèse Hudicourt, wife of attorney Pierre Hudicourt, and an intellectual and Marxist, formed a library book club for an elite group of educated women where they read books in both English and French including novels and political materials. They then discussed the topics from feminism to Marxism, leading to a growing awareness of women's lack of civil rights in Haitian society. This heightened awareness and the US military occupation, which had begun in 1915 and by 1920 had been exposed as a reign of sexual assault on Haitian women" caused social divisions to evaporate in an effort to protect themselves. Garoute, Hudicourt, Eugéne Malbranche-Sylvain and other women of the social elite organized the Union Patriotique with the goal of sending a delegation to Washington, D.C. to demand that the US military be controlled. When they had finally collected enough funds to send a delegation in 1921, President Harding and the Congress were unresponsive, but meetings with W. E. B. Du Bois and the NAACP resulted in a "fact-finding mission" being sent and the development of ties with black women from the US who were involved in clubs and social activism. These US women saw enfranchisement as a means of ending their own sexual exploitation and recognized that sexual violence was an international problem.

== Ligue Féminine d'Action Sociale ==
Against this backdrop of ongoing women's opposition to the US military occupation of Haiti (1915–1934) she was among the founders in 1934 of the Ligue Féminine d'Action Sociale (aka Feminine League for Social Action) and its president starting in 1941. She made several impassioned and well-documented speeches in the National Assembly for full equality for women buttressing her arguments with the various conventions signed by Haiti in support of women's rights.

Besides Alice Garoute, the League's members included: Madeleine Sylvain, Fernande Bellegarde, Thérèse Hudicourt, Alice Téligny Mathon, Marie-Thérèse Colimon and Marie-Thérèse Poitevien many of whom were teachers of elite social extraction. The League was banned by the government two months after its founding. The league's goals were supported by the political left and included: more schools for girls, equality for women in family law, equal pay for equal work, voting rights for women, free labor unions and a labor ministry with a women's bureau. The league was reestablished when it agreed to study its goals instead of immediately implementing them. The league is credited for the granting of voting rights for women in 1957.

== The First Congress of Haitian Women ==
The First Congress of Haitian women was organized by the League on April 10–14, 1950 under the watchful eye of its honorary president, First Lady Lucienne Heurtelou Estimé. Alice Garoute offered a particularly impassioned address about the state of education of Haitian women during which she argued that those women who had been schooled since 1940 in the three private schools that accepted them had done as well as men. She also deplored that women in Haiti during her time were treated as poorly as during Napoleon's Code Noir (aka Napoleon's Black Code): "like children and the mentally ill". At the Congress' closing ceremony Alice Garoute and other notable women lodged an official list of their demands.

== Publication ==
Congrès national des femmes haitiennes: le Féminisme en marche (1951) Eben-Ezer
