= Tina Nadine Anilus =

Haitian human rights activist

Tina Nadine Anilus Ferrier is a Haitian human rights activist. After training as a linguist and later as a teacher, Anilus became known for her campaigning for the rights of women in Haiti, culminating with her establishing Rezo Fanm Kapab Dayiti, a non-governmental women's organisation, in 2010.

== Early life and education ==
Anilus was born on 26 November in Port-au-Prince, the capital of Haiti, and was raised in nearby Carrefour. Her father was an entrepreneuer and a Vodou priest, while her mother was a teacher.

Anilus graduated from the State University of Haiti with a bachelor's degree in applied linguistics; she went on to obtain a master's degree in language sciences from the University of the French West Indies and Guiana. Anilus worked for six years as a teaching assistant at the State University of Haiti's Faculty of Applied Linguistics.

== Career ==
Anilus trained as a teacher, and worked for several years at a secondary school teaching French literature, communication, and Haitian Creole.

=== Political career ===
Anilus began becoming involved in the movement for women's rights in her native Carrefour; for a time, she was the commune's director of social and cultural affairs. Anilus went on to become a cabinet member of the national government's Ministry on the Status and Rights of Women. During the 2015–16 Haitian parliamentary election, Anilus ran as the Fusion of Haitian Social Democrats' candidate in the Carrefour constituency; in the first round, she received 1087 (5.4%) votes, and was eliminated. The seat was subsequently won by Jacuqes Beauvil of Vérité.

=== Activism ===
In 2010, shortly after the Haiti earthquake, Anilus founded Rezo Fanm Kapab Dayiti (REFKAD; lit. 'The Network of Capable Women'), a network of women's groups and feminist organisations across Haiti which aimed to provide "protection, listening, and support" to Haitian women and girls, including initially those impacted by the earthquake and its aftermath.

From 2011, Anilus has co-organised Haitian events to commemorate the United Nations' 16 Days of Activism against Gender-Based Violence. This has included providing training to women about domestic abuse in Ouest and working with motorcycle taxi drivers to help raise awarneess.

Since 2014, Anilus has organised annual summer camps in Jérémie for children, where she has led classes on black history, self-confidence, career coaching, children's rights, and gender-based violence.

From 2018, when a series of protests and an attempted coup d'état led to the ongoing socioeconomic and political Haitian crisis, Anilus steered REFKAD to begin providing support to women and children displaced by the conflict, including providing medical, psychological, administrative, and legal support, as well as shelter for those fleeing both domestic violence and violence as a result of the conflict. That same year, she had criticised the President of Haiti, Jovenel Moïse, after he judged a competition to commemorate the World Cup in which a nine-year-old girl danced in a "hypersexual manner" during a competition in order to win a car, describing it as a "public humiliation" and a form of exploitation; she joined other women's rights groups to focus on protecting the rights of women in Haiti.

Anilus was the executive secretary of the Campaign for the Reduction of Violence in Haiti and the gender coordinator for the non-governmental organisation Vivario Haiti. In 2023, Anilus spoke at the United Nations Economic and Social Council's 2023 Meeting on the Transition from Relief to Development in Geneva, discussing challenges to health, food security and protection in Haiti.
