= Michaëlle Jean =

Governor General of Canada from 2005 to 2010

The Right Honourable Michaëlle Jean PC CC CMM COM CD FRCPSC(hon)
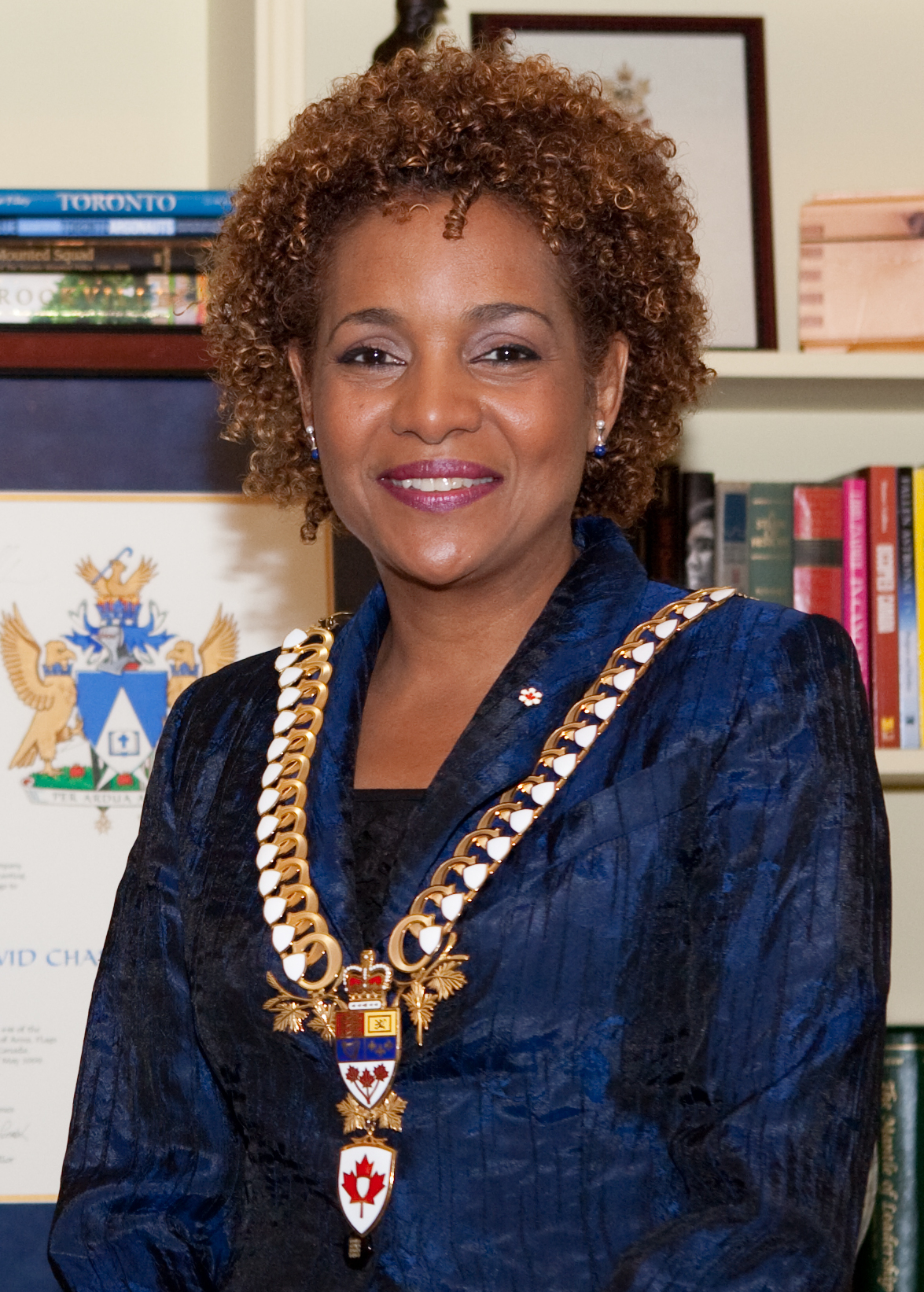
- Jean c. 2010

27th Governor General of Canada
- In office September 27, 2005 – October 1, 2010
- Monarch: Elizabeth II
- Prime Minister: Paul Martin; Stephen Harper
- Preceded by: Adrienne Clarkson
- Succeeded by: David Johnston

3rd Secretary-General of the Organisation internationale de la Francophonie
- In office January 5, 2015 – January 2, 2019
- Preceded by: Abdou Diouf
- Succeeded by: Louise Mushikiwabo

United Nations Special Envoy to Haiti
- In office November 8, 2010 – November 8, 2014

Personal details
- Born: September 6, 1957 (age 69) Port-au-Prince, Haiti
- Spouse: Jean-Daniel Lafond
- Education: Université de Montréal (BA, MA)
- Website: Official website

Michaëlle Jean (French: [mika.ɛl ʒɑ̃]; born September 6, 1957) is a Canadian former journalist who served as the 27th governor general of Canada from 2005 to 2010. She is the first Haitian Canadian and Black person to hold this office.

Jean was the third secretary-general of the Organisation internationale de la Francophonie from 2015 until 2019. She was the first woman to hold the position and held the position until the end of 2018.

Jean was a refugee from Haiti—coming to Canada in 1968—and was raised in the town of Thetford Mines, Quebec. After receiving two university degrees, Jean worked as a journalist and broadcaster for Radio-Canada and the Canadian Broadcasting Corporation (CBC), as well as also undertaking charity work, mostly in the field of assisting victims of domestic violence. In 2005, she was appointed governor general by Queen Elizabeth II, on the recommendation of Prime Minister Paul Martin, to replace Adrienne Clarkson as vicereine. She occupied the post until being succeeded by David Johnston in 2010. Early in her tenure, comments of hers recorded in some of the film works by her husband, Jean-Daniel Lafond, were construed as supporting Quebec sovereignty and her holding of dual citizenship caused doubt about her loyalties. But Jean denied separatist leanings, renounced her citizenship of France (acquired through her marriage), and eventually became a respected vicereine noted for her attention to the Canadian Forces, Aboriginal Canadians, and the arts, especially youth involvement in them. In 2010, Jean was appointed to a four-year term as the Special Envoy for Haiti for the United Nations Educational, Scientific, and Cultural Organization.

Michaëlle Jean was sworn in as a member of the Queen's Privy Council for Canada on September 26, 2012.

== Early life and education ==
Jean's family hails from Haiti; she was born in Port-au-Prince, baptized at the Holy Trinity Cathedral, and spent winters in that city and summers and weekends in Jacmel, her mother's hometown. Though her father worked as principal and teacher for a Protestant independent school in Port-au-Prince, Jean was educated at home, as her parents did not want her swearing allegiance to the then Haitian president, François Duvalier, as all Haitian schoolchildren were required to do.

With her family, Jean fled Haiti to escape Duvalier's regime, under which Jean's father was arrested and tortured in 1965. Jean's father left for Canada in 1967 while she arrived with her mother and sister the following year; the family settled together at Thetford Mines, Quebec. Jean's father, however, became increasingly distant and violent, and her parents' marriage eventually fell apart; she, with her mother and sister, then moved to a basement apartment in the Little Burgundy neighbourhood of Montreal. Her close friends in her youth included Mireille Métellus, later to become a noted actress, and Sonya Biddle, who became an actress and a Montreal city councillor.

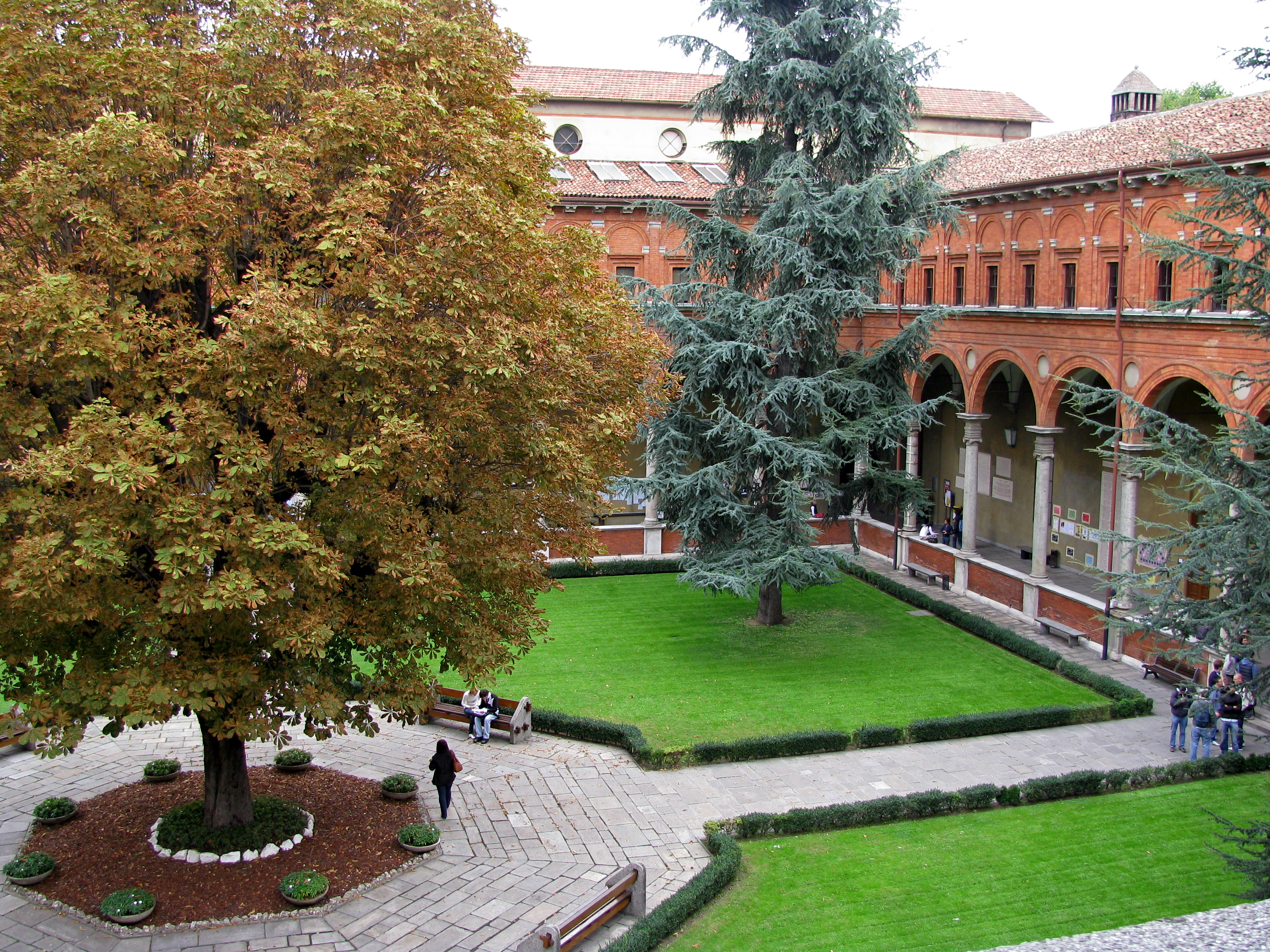
The Catholic University of Milan, where Jean studied languages and literature

Jean received a Bachelor of Arts degree in Italian and Hispanic languages and literature from the University of Montreal, and, from 1984 to 1986, taught Italian Studies there, while completing her Master of Arts degree in comparative literature. She then went on with language and literature studies at the University of Florence, the University of Perugia, and the Catholic University of Milan. Besides French and English, Jean is fluent in Spanish, Italian, and Haitian Creole, and can read Portuguese.

Concurrent with her studies between 1979 and 1987, Jean coordinated a study on spousal abuse and worked at a women's shelter, which paved the way for her establishment of a network of shelters for women and children across Canada. She also involved herself in organizations dedicated to assisting immigrants to Canada obtain the entry they desired, and later worked for Employment and Immigration Canada and at the Conseil des Communautés culturelles du Québec, where Jean began writing about the experiences of immigrant women. She married French-born, Canadian filmmaker Jean-Daniel Lafond, and the couple adopted as their daughter Marie-Éden, an orphaned child from Jacmel. Through her marriage to Lafond, Jean has two stepdaughters.

== Journalism, broadcasting, and film careers ==
Jean became a reporter, filmmaker, and broadcaster for Radio-Canada in 1988, hosting news and affairs programs such as Actuel, Montréal ce soir, Virages, and Le Point; she was the first person of Caribbean descent to be seen on French television news in Canada. She then moved in 1995 to Réseau de l'information (RDI), Radio-Canada's all-news channel, in order to anchor a number of programmes, Le Monde ce soir, l'Édition québécoise, Horizons francophones, Les Grands reportages, Le Journal RDI, and RDI à l'écoute, for example. Four years later, she was asked by CBC's English language all-news channel, CBC Newsworld, to host The Passionate Eye and Rough Cuts, which both broadcast the best in Canadian and foreign documentary films. By 2004, Jean was hosting her own show, Michaëlle, while continuing to anchor RDI's Grands reportages, as well as acting occasionally as anchor of Le Téléjournal.

Over the same period, Jean made several films with her husband, including the award-winning Haïti dans tous nos rêves ("Haiti in All Our Dreams"), in which she meets her uncle, the poet and essayist René Depestre, who fled from the Duvalier dictatorship into exile in France and wrote about his dreams for Haiti, and tells him Haiti awaits his return. She similarly produced and hosted news and documentary programming for television on both the English and French services of the CBC.

== Governor General of Canada ==
Jean was Canada's first governor general of Caribbean origin; the third woman (after Jeanne Sauvé and Adrienne Clarkson); the fourth youngest (after the Marquess of Lorne, who was 33 years old in 1878; the Marquess of Lansdowne, who was 38 years old in 1883; and Edward Schreyer, who was 43 years old in 1979); the fourth former journalist (after Sauvé, Roméo LeBlanc and Clarkson); and the second after Clarkson to not only have neither a political nor military background, but also to be a visible minority, to break the tradition of Canadian-born governors general, and to be in an interracial marriage. Jean was also the first representative of Queen Elizabeth II to have been born during the latter's reign, and her appointment saw the first child living in Rideau Hall, the official residence since Schreyer and his young family lived there in the early 1980s.

=== As governor general-designate ===
On August 4, 2005, it was announced from the Office of the Prime Minister of Canada that Queen Elizabeth II had approved Prime Minister Paul Martin's choice of Jean to succeed Adrienne Clarkson as the Queen's representative. At the time, Martin said of Jean that she "is a woman of talent and achievement. Her personal story is nothing short of extraordinary. And extraordinary is precisely what we seek in a governor generalship—who after all must represent all of Canada to all Canadians and to the rest of the world as well." Almost immediately, there was speculation that Martin had been influenced by the political climate in Ottawa at the time, leading the Prime Minister to deny that rejuvenated popularity for his party in Quebec was a motivating factor in his decision.

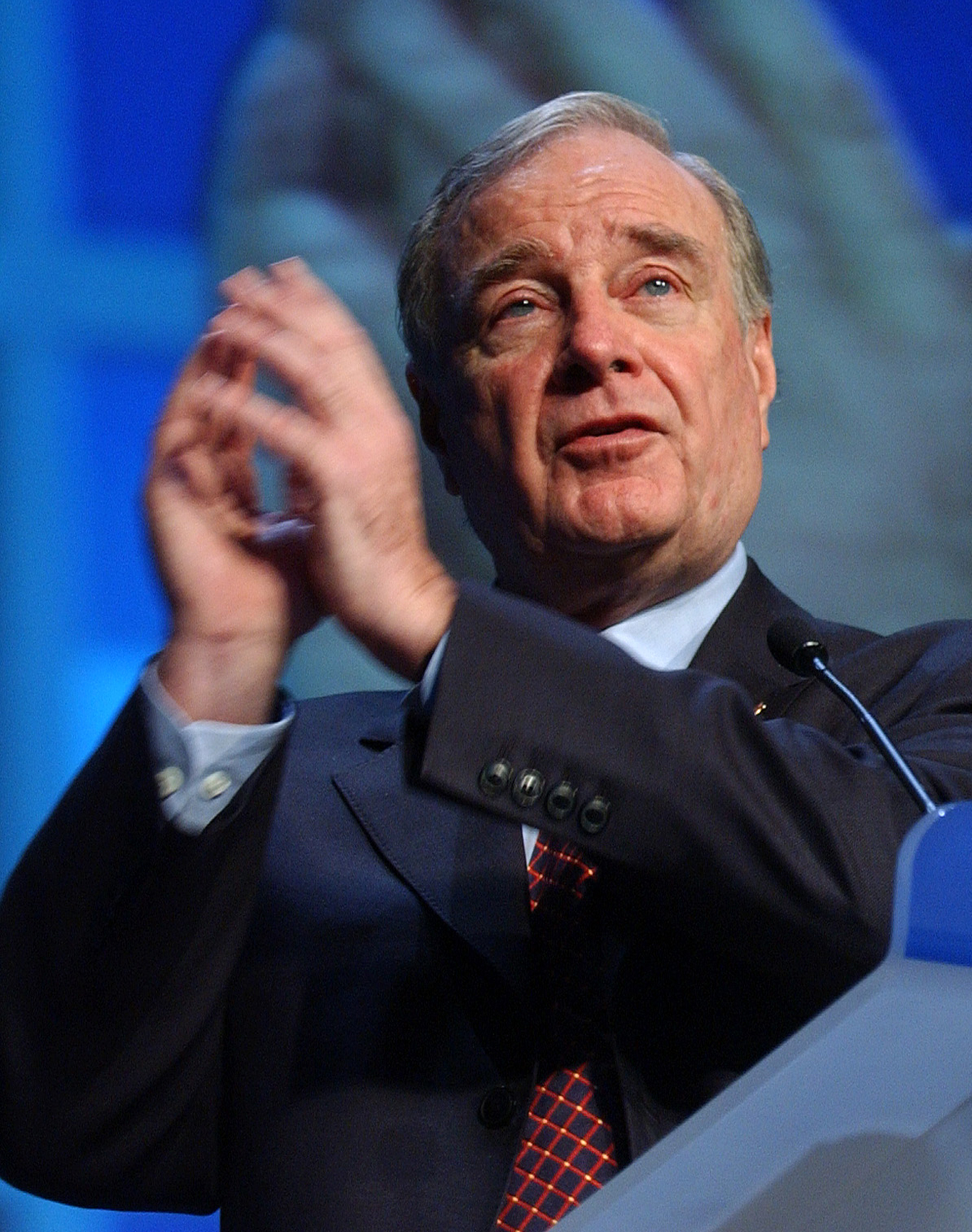
Prime Minister Paul Martin, who recommended Jean to Queen Elizabeth II for appointment as the sovereign's viceroy

From Her Majesty's Loyal Opposition, the upcoming appointment was met with mostly favourable comments, (Note: Stephen Harper, then the leader of Her Majesty's Loyal Opposition as head of the Conservative Party, offered his congratulations and said that Jean's life story "serves as a great example to many Canadians. I know Mme Jean will serve Canada in a dignified, viceregal fashion." Jack Layton, leader of the New Democratic Party, said that he wished Jean and her family well, and that he looked "forward to seeing a family again in Rideau Hall, which is fitting for the first Governor-General [sic] of a new century", and went on to say that Jean "knows well the value of the peacekeeping operations that give Canadians so much pride. Bloc Québécois leader Gilles Duceppe expressed disappointment at Jean for deciding to "accept a position... within an institution that is not democratic.") Jean's predecessor applauded the choice, saying that Jean was "an exciting and imaginative choice for Governor General." In her first remarks after this announcement, Jean herself encouraged Canadians to involve themselves in their communities, and stated that she wished to reach out to all Canadians, regardless of their background, and made it a goal to focus especially on Canadian youth and the disadvantaged.

However, by August 11, 2005, reports emerged of a forthcoming piece by René Boulanger for the Quebec sovereigntist publication Le Québécois that would reveal Jean and her husband's support for Quebec independence, citing Lafond's associations with former members of the terrorist organization, the Front de libération du Québec (FLQ), specifically Jacques Rose. Though Boulanger admitted that he was motivated to incite a rejection of Jean by Anglophone Canadians, Gilles Rhéaume, former president of the Saint-Jean-Baptiste Society, called on the Governor General-Designate to reveal how she voted in Quebec's 1995 referendum on independence, and Members of Parliament, as well as some provincial premiers, demanded that Jean and her husband clarify where their sympathies lay. Then, four days after the Prime Minister publicly explained that Jean and her spouse had both undergone thorough background checks by the Royal Canadian Mounted Police and the Canadian Security Intelligence Service, there came to light, on August 17, the existence of a documentary in which Jean had been filmed with several hard-line Quebec separatists, all toasting "to independence" after Jean stated: "Independence can't be given, it must be taken."

That same day, Jean responded with a public statement, saying "I wish to tell you unequivocally that both my husband and I are proud to be Canadian and that we have the greatest respect for the institutions of our country. We are fully committed to Canada. I would not have accepted this position otherwise... [We] have never belonged to a political party or the separatist movement," and went on to say that in the documented footage she had been speaking about Haiti and not Quebec. Martin added on his earlier comments: "There is no doubt in my mind that her devotion to Canada is longstanding and resolute," though some critics continued to argue that Jean's response had been too vague. By late August, polls showed that there had been a 20% drop in support for the recommendation of Jean as the next governor general, in response to which the Haitian community voiced their support for Jean, even holding special church services in her honour. Jean reaffirmed in late 2010 that the rumours of her separatist sympathies were untrue and revealed that she had been upset by those journalists who she saw as capitalizing on sensationalism, rather than seeking accuracy through investigation, but she had been advised repeatedly not to respond.

The Queen held audience with Jean and her family on September 6, 2005, at Balmoral Castle. Though this type of meeting with a governor general-designate was standard, Jean's was unique in that the presence of her young daughter marked the first time in Elizabeth's reign that her designated viceroy-to-be had brought a child to an audience, which caused some protocol issues. The weekend was informal; for one dinner, coincidentally on the eve of Jean's birthday, the Queen drove Jean and her family to a cottage on the Balmoral estate, where they were joined by Prince Philip and Prince Edward, who, along with the Queen, performed the cooking and washing up. Of it, Jean said "[i]t was probably the best birthday of my life." The commission appointing Jean was issued on September 10 under the royal sign-manual and Great Seal of Canada.

Upon her return to Canada, Jean yet again became a target when the subject of her dual citizenship was raised, in particular the French variety she had obtained through her marriage to the French-born Lafond. A section of the French civil code forbade French citizens from holding government or military positions in other countries, (Note: Article 23-8 of the Napoleonic Code allows the French government to ask French citizens to leave the foreign service or lose French nationality in 15 days to two months.) yet Jean, as governor general, would hold a governmental position as the representative of Canada's head of state, and, as such, would have a military role carrying out the duties of Commander-in-Chief of the Canadian Forces, as constitutionally vested in the monarch. The French embassy in Ottawa stated that there was "no question" that the law would not be enforced in Jean's case, but, on September 25, two days before her swearing-in, Jean made it public that she had renounced her French citizenship "[in] light of the responsibilities related to the function of Governor General of Canada and Commander-in-Chief of the Canadian Forces" and "France acceded to my request by decree on September 23, 2005."

=== In office ===
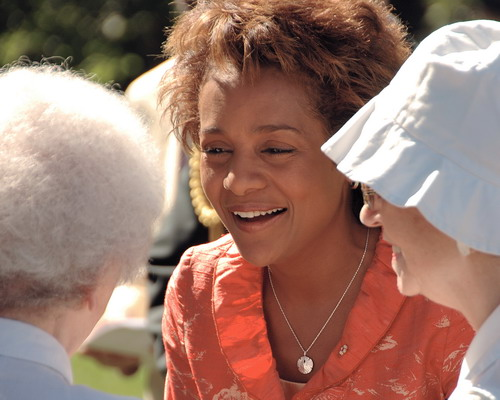
Michaëlle Jean greets concert attendees at the Ottawa Chamber Music Festival at Rideau Hall

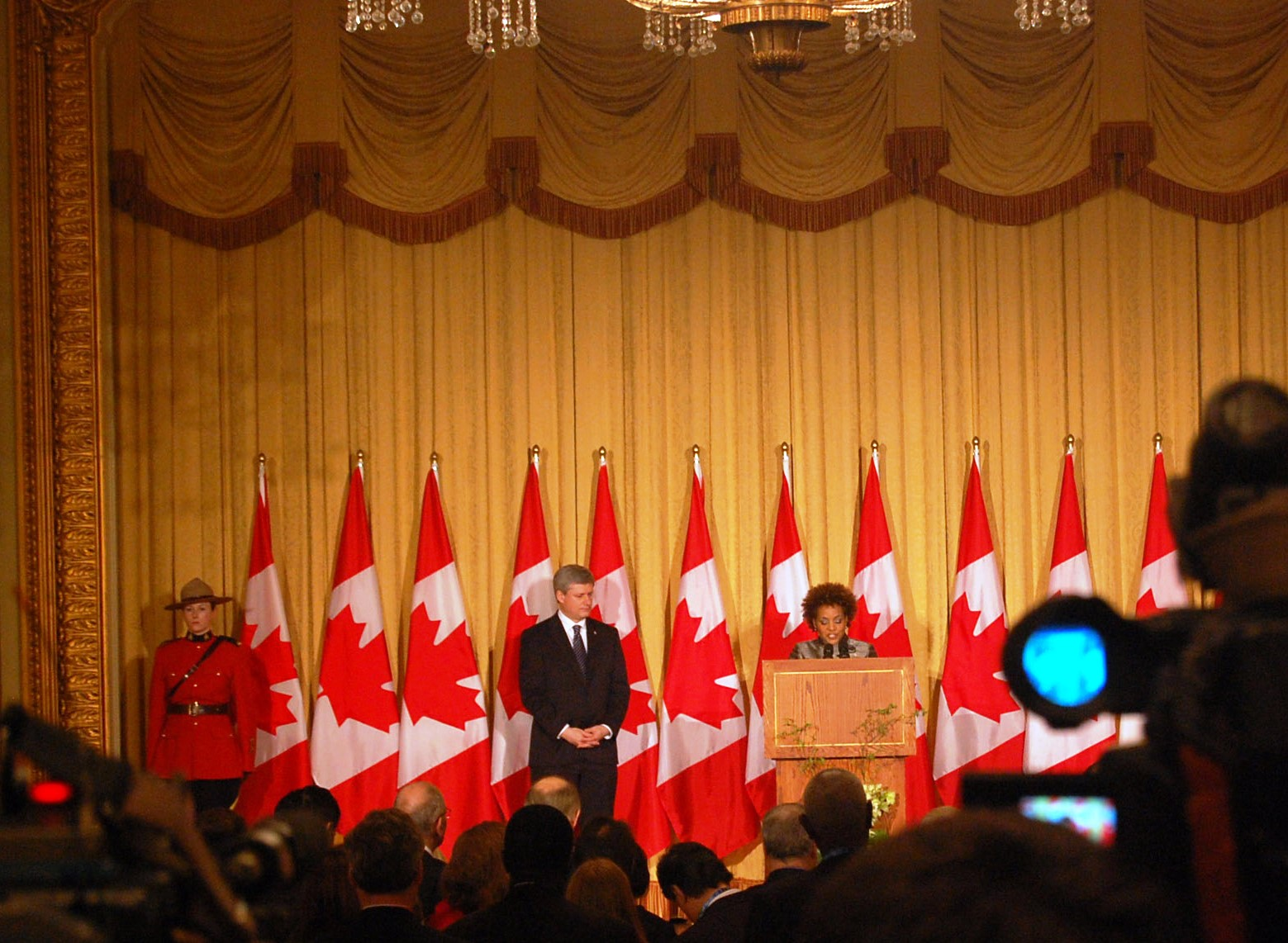
Governor General Michaëlle Jean and Prime Minister Stephen Harper at the reception for heads of state at the 2010 Vancouver Winter Olympic Games

At her investiture ceremony in the Senate chamber on September 27, 2005, Jean declared in a speech described as "moving" that "the time of the Two Solitudes that for too long described the character of this country is past," and called for the protection of the environment, the shielding of culture against globalization, and an end to the marginalization of young people. According to one media account, "the pomp and circumstance of Canada's most significant state function were blended with humour, passion and even tears." while The Globe and Mail columnist John Ibbitson reflected the general captivation with the new governor general in the following way:

[H]ere is this beautiful young Canadian of Haitian birth, with a smile that makes you catch your breath, with a bemused older husband by her side, and a daughter who literally personifies our future, and you look at them and you think: Yes, this is our great achievement, this is the Canada that Canada wants to be, this is the Canada that will ultimately make way for different cultural identities.

Echoing her inaugural speech, the motto on the personal coat of arms created for Jean upon taking office as governor general was BRISER LES SOLITUDES, which translates into "breaking down solitudes". One of her first acts as vicereine was then to launch an online chat with Canadians, as part of the larger project of creating within the Governor General's domain name a website dubbed "Citizen Voices: Breaking Down Solitudes", where users could engage each other in discussion forums and prominent individuals could post blog entries. The focus extended beyond simply the relationship between the traditional Two Solitudes of Francophones and Anglophones in Canada to include relations between peoples of all racial, linguistic, cultural, and gender groups.

Over the first two years of her mandate, Jean embarked on the traditional viceregal tours of Canada's provinces and territories. In British Columbia, Jean presented the Grey Cup at the 2005 Canadian Football League championship game; in Iqaluit, Nunavut, she opened the Toonik Tyme Festival, where she donated eighty books in Inuktitut, French, and English to the Centennial Library in commemoration of Queen Elizabeth II's 80th birthday; and, on May 4, 2006, she became the first governor general to address the Alberta legislature. During these tours, Jean also focused strongly on the plight of female victims of violence, meeting with representatives of women's organizations, such as when, in 2007, she participated in a historic private discussion with aboriginal women chiefs and elders at Saskatchewan's Government House. In contrast to her low approval ratings prior to her appointment, crowds were large and welcoming wherever Jean went. Only as her convoy arrived at the National War Memorial for her first Remembrance Day ceremony, on November 11, 2005, were Jean and Lafond greeted with disapproval from an audience, when veterans turned their backs on the Governor General and her consort to show contempt for two people the veterans felt had worked to break up the country they had fought to defend.

==== Military duties and welcomes overseas ====
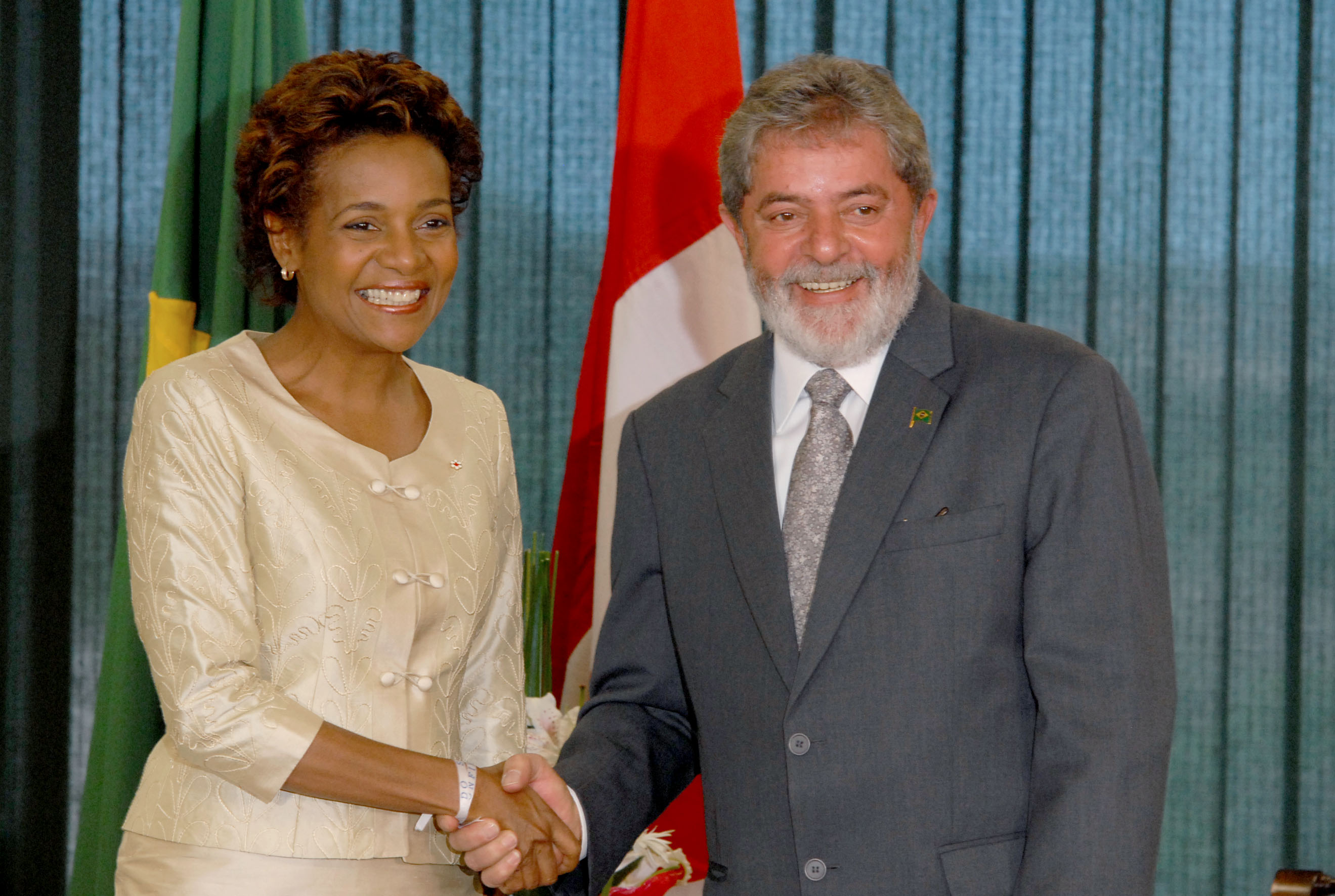
Governor General Michaëlle Jean with then President of Brazil, Lula da Silva, July 11, 2007

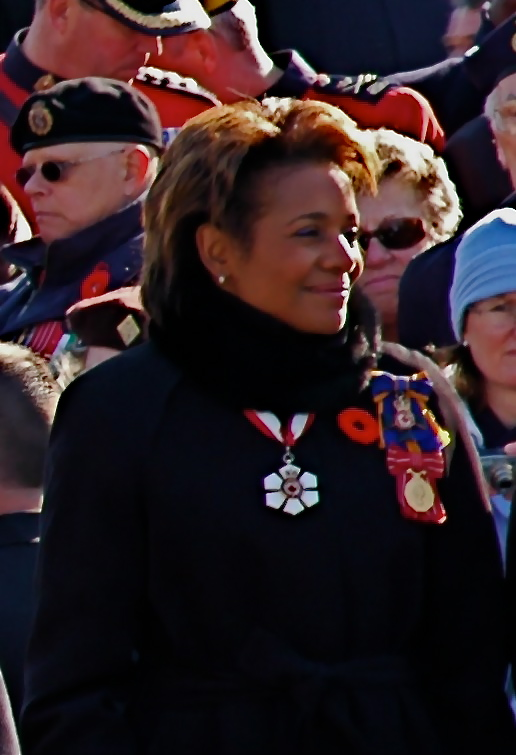
Jean presiding over Remembrance Day ceremonies in Ottawa, 2007

The viceregal family undertook their first international trip in February 2006, journeying to Italy to attend the closing ceremonies of the 2006 Winter Olympics, meet Italian President Carlo Azeglio Ciampi in Torino, and Pope Benedict XVI at the Vatican. Three months later, Jean attended the investiture of René Préval as President of Haiti, Jean's first visit to her homeland in her capacity as the Queen's representative, and where she was greeted with enthusiasm in Jacmel. At the end of the year, between November 18 and December 11, 2006, Jean then embarked on a trip consisting of state visits to five African countries—Algeria, Mali, Ghana, South Africa, and Morocco—wherein the Governor General encouraged women's rights. She also, in a precedent-breaking move, personally explained on her Citizen Voices website the role of the governor general in undertaking such trips and the reason behind these particular tours throughout Africa, after which she continued to post her observations and feelings on her experiences on the continent. In Mali, where she arrived on November 23, 2006, Jean was greeted by tens of thousands of people lining the highway as her motorcade passed and, in the town of Benieli, she was presented with a goat, replete with a Canadian flag on its collar. Male vendors also gave Canadian journalists gifts to be passed on to Jean, provided that she also be given their telephone numbers. Further, during the South African leg of the tour, then President Thabo Mbeki praised the Queen-in-Council's decision to appoint Jean as governor general, citing it as an example to European countries of how African immigrants could be treated.

Jean embraced her role as acting commander-in-chief, one of her first international duties being a trip, from October 29–30, 2005, to France for the 90th anniversary of the Battle of Vimy Ridge, just after which she returned to Canada for the arrival at Trenton, Ontario, of the bodies of six Canadian soldiers killed in Afghanistan. Jean made on March 8, 2007, her first visit to Canadian troops taking part in the offensive in Afghanistan; she had earlier expressed her desire to go, but Harper advised against such a trip on the grounds of security concerns, the relevance of which were demonstrated when two attacks were made against Canadian soldiers on the same day the Governor General landed in Kabul. Jean had the arrival timed specifically for International Women's Day, stating: "the women of Afghanistan may face the most unbearable conditions, but they never stop fighting for survival. Of course, we, the rest of the women around the world, took too long to hear the cries of our Afghan sisters, but I am here to tell them that they are no longer alone. And neither are the people of Afghanistan." Part of the Governor General's itinerary included meeting with Afghan women, Canadian soldiers, Royal Canadian Mounted Police teams, humanitarian workers, and diplomats.

==== "Loose cannon" accusation ====
There was, by early 2007, some perception that Jean's schedule was seemingly thinner than that of her predecessors; an initial explanation of fatigue was further detailed by the Secretary to the Governor General as thyroid problems, and that the vicereine's doctor had advised rest after Jean's previously hectic diary. At the same time, some in the Ottawa Press Gallery opined that Jean had on a few occasions in the previous year overstepped the boundaries of an office that was expected to remain non-partisan; journalist Chantal Hébert said that the Governor General had "been wading uncommonly deep in political territory over the past few months", citing Jean's criticism of Quebec sovereigntists and her expressed support for the mission of Canadian troops in Afghanistan. Further, Michael Valpy penned a piece in The Globe and Mail critiquing Jean for inviting who Valpy described as "potentially politically charged individuals" to post on her Citizen Voices website. Jean had also made, at the roast-like annual National Press Gallery dinner, satirical remarks about Parti Québécois leadership candidate André Boisclair's admitted cocaine use and, in a September 18, 2006, interview regarding a proposed subsidy for Canadians to travel domestically, she commented that Quebecers "are sometimes very disconnected from the rest of Canada" and that their isolation affected Canada's unity. Jean later clarified her opinion by adding that Canadians from all provinces were disconnected from other parts of the country, and a September 26 editorial in the Montreal Gazette supported Jean's statements on the divisions between Canada's peoples, saying that supporting national unity was a part of a governor general's mandate; but, the ire of Quebec separatist politicians was not assuaged. Further, the content of a speech by Jean to mark the 25th anniversary of the Charter of Rights and Freedoms was regarded as thinly veiled criticism of her Cabinet's decision to end the Court Challenges Program and, into 2007, it was reported that Jean's staff at Rideau Hall had been systematically removing royal portraits from the walls of the residence. All of this prompted Valpy to reveal that, early in his time as prime minister, Stephen Harper was told by Alex Himelfarb, then the Clerk of the Privy Council: "Prime Minister, your biggest problem is in Rideau Hall," meaning Jean and her potential to be a "loose cannon".

Jean carried out the regular ceremonial duties of state, such as dedicating the new Michael Lee-Chin Crystal at the Royal Ontario Museum on June 1, 2007 (following in the footsteps of her predecessor, Prince Arthur, Duke of Connaught and Strathearn, the governor general who opened the first expansion of the museum in 1914), and undertaking a state visit to Brazil, from July 6–15, 2007.

==== Parliamentary prorogation ====
In late 2008, the Governor General had to return to Canada in the midst of a state visit in Europe to contend with a parliamentary dispute, as a coalition of three opposition parties in parliament threatened to rescind their confidence in the Cabinet under the leadership of Stephen Harper and subsequently form the government. After two and half hours of deliberation, Jean chose to follow the constitutional precedent of accepting her prime minister's advice, which was to prorogue parliament until late January 2009. At the end of Jean's viceregal tenure, Peter H. Russell, one of the constitutional experts from whom Jean sought advice, disclosed that the Governor General granted the prorogation on two conditions: parliament would reconvene soon and, when it did, the Cabinet would produce a passable budget. This, Russell said, set a precedent that would prevent future prime ministers from advising the prorogation of parliament "for any length of time for any reason." Jean thus prevented the approaching non-confidence vote, as well as a resulting situation wherein she would be required to choose between asking the coalition to form a government or dissolving parliament and dropping the writs, after having a federal election only six weeks earlier. Along with the subsequent prorogation of parliament in December 2009 and the earlier calling of an election in October 2008, Jean was for almost two years part of a controversy in the Canadian media that focused on the constitutional relationships between the governor general and the prime minister or the leaders of the parties in opposition.

==== Seal meat, new uniforms, and crisis in Haiti ====
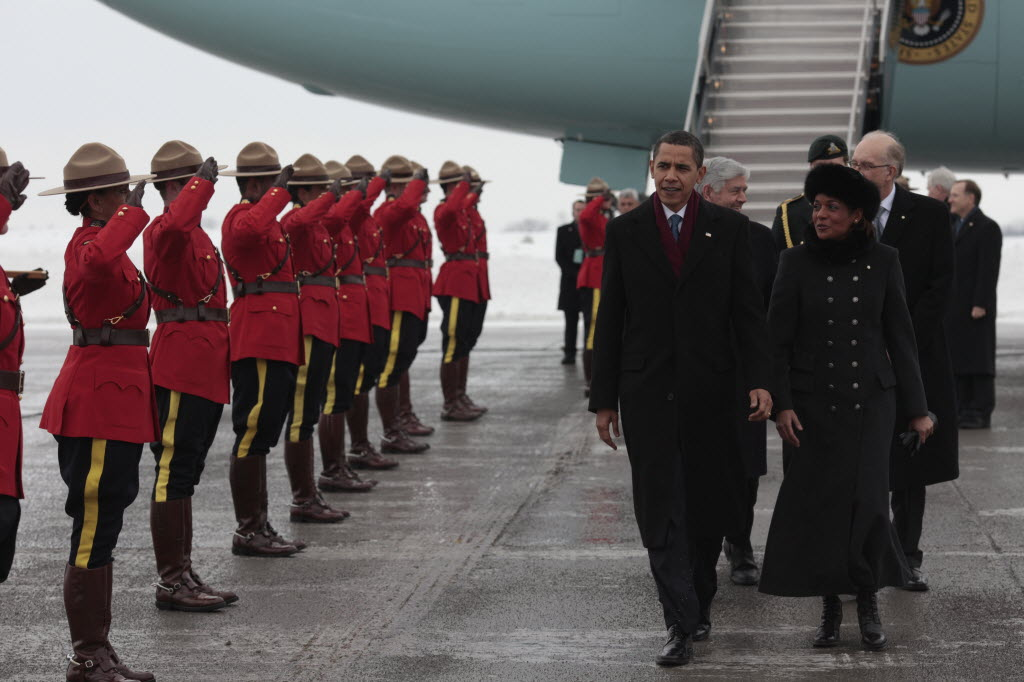
As the representative of Canada's head of state, the Governor General welcomes US President Barack Obama to Canada, February 19, 2009

During a tour of Nunavut in early 2009, the Governor General again garnered headlines when she participated in a traditional Inuit seal feast at a community festival, gutting a seal that had been recently killed by hunters and consuming a piece of the raw heart. While both her immediate predecessor and Prince Charles had previously partaken in raw seal meat in the Canadian Arctic, Jean's simple act drew attention, both positive and negative, because of its coincidence with the European Parliament's recent ban on the import of Canadian seal products. Dining on seal was a traditional aspect of the annual event and it was proper etiquette for the Governor General, as a guest, to take part. When asked by reporters what her motivations were, Jean replied: "Take from that what you will."

A series of state visits followed in 2009, to Norway, Croatia, Greece, and Mexico, as well as another visit to Canadian troops in Afghanistan from September 8–9. In between these diplomatic missions, Jean presided on June 27 over the ceremonies in Halifax, Nova Scotia, for the consecration and presentation of the new Queen's Colour to the Canadian navy; she wore at that time the Commander-in-Chief's naval uniform, marking the revival of a practice that had ceased following the tenure of Ray Hnatyshyn. She, along with Prince Charles, did the same at the 2009 Remembrance Day events in Ottawa, both at that time sporting Canadian army dress uniform. Then, in June 2010, Jean conducted a fleet review in Esquimalt Harbour, to mark the 100th anniversary of the founding of the Royal Canadian Navy.

The vicereine again won plaudits, though not universal, from the media and public for her actions following the earthquake that devastated her native Haiti on January 12, 2010, in which she lost her friend Magalie Marcelin, godmother to Jean's daughter. The Governor General, with her prime minister, Stephen Harper, attended an emergency meeting at the Department of Foreign Affairs and then made a tearful speech, with parts in Haitian Creole, thanking the Cabinet for its swift action and the Canadian media for its coverage, as well as urging strength and courage to Haitians. She later attended a vigil in Montreal and, on January 25, 2010, met at Rideau Hall with Haitian prime minister Jean-Max Bellerive. After officially opening the 2010 Winter Olympics in Vancouver, on February 12, and the Winter Paralympics a month later, the Governor General made a visit to Haiti, from March 8–10, 2010, to observe the devastation and Canadian assistance being meted out there and to meet with President Préval.

==== End of tenure ====
Jean announced to the press in early 2010 that she would step out of the viceregal role near the end of the traditional, but not official, five-year period. The then official opposition leader, Michael Ignatieff, publicly advocated the extension of Jean's tenure, in doing so breaking the tradition of keeping consultations on the next governor general among the prime minister and opposition party leaders confidential. Polls conducted around that time showed that Jean had earned an approval rating of 60%, and a constitutional expert at the University of Toronto called her performance as governor general "superb", though some of her missteps were noted.

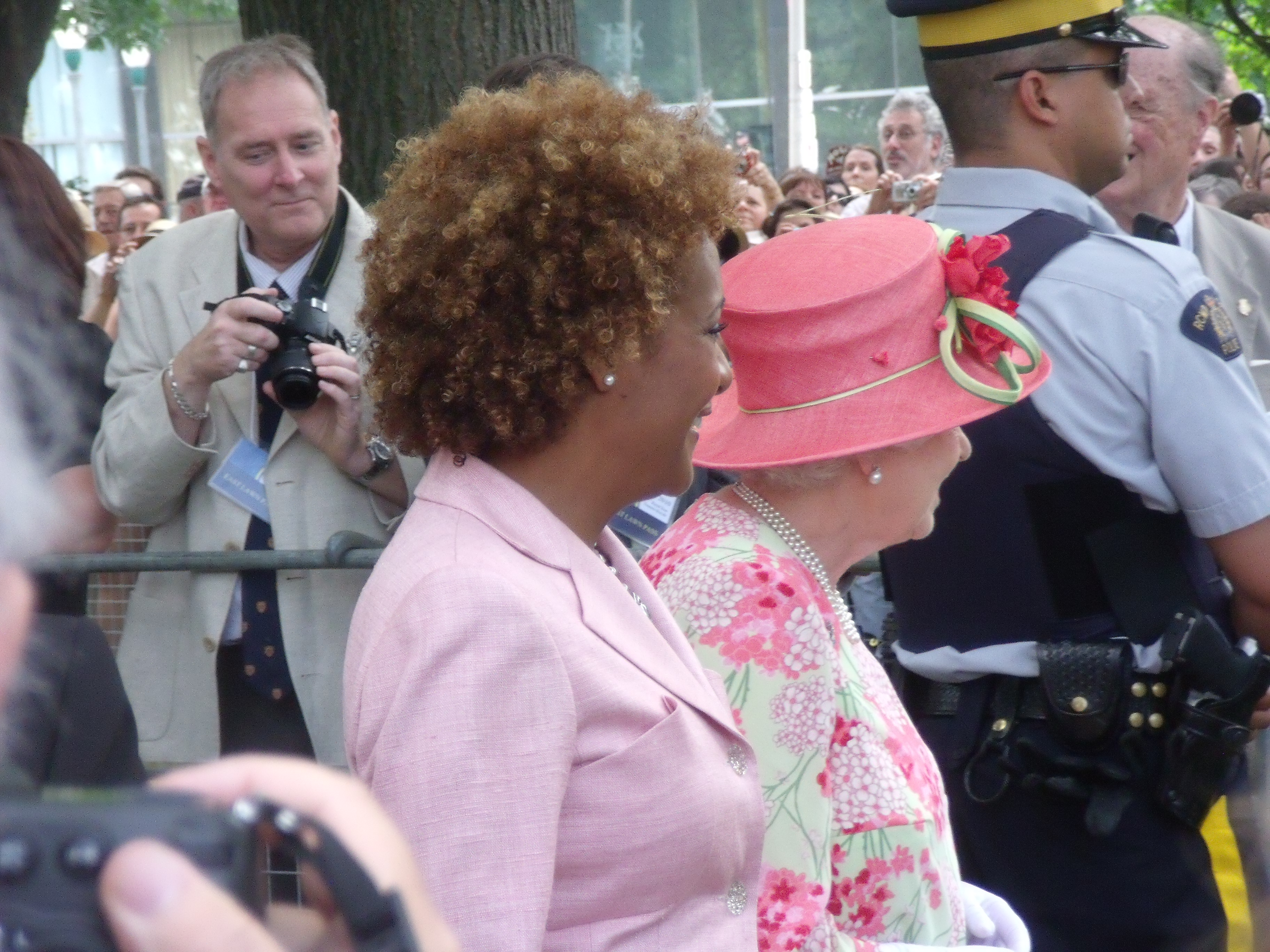
Jean (left) with Queen Elizabeth II at Queen's Park, Toronto, July 2010

On May 10, 2010, Princess Margriet of the Netherlands presented Jean with a new tulip cultivar named the Michaëlle Jean tulip; with deep maroon petals; it was designed to reflect the Governor General's personal tastes. This carried on the tradition of Dutch royalty giving tulips as gifts to Canada.

Summaries of Jean's time as the Queen's representative emerged by mid-2010; Jean was regarded as having fulfilled the role in an admirable, though not perfect, fashion. It was noted that she used the office, her speaking abilities, and photogenic nature to Canada's advantage, promoting freedom, human rights, and urban youth, and to bring attention to socio-economic problems in the country's north. She was commended for her dedication to the arts, Aboriginal Canadians, the Armed Forces, and her outreach to Haiti following the earthquake there, but critiqued for specific incidents, such as referring to herself as Canada's head of state and making public comments that skirted the political. Her ability to personally connect with those she met was also noted, as well as her frequent displays of emotion; commentators dubbed her the empathizer-in-chief.

== Post-viceregal life ==
In the weeks before Jean's departure from the viceregal office, the Cabinet announced that the Michaëlle Jean Foundation would be established by the federal Crown-in-Council to focus on promoting education, culture, and creativity among youth from rural, northern, and/or poor communities in Canada. It was also reported that the Secretary-General of the United Nations would be appointing Jean to act as special envoy to Haiti for the United Nations Educational, Scientific and Cultural Organization, with an aim to fight poverty and illiteracy and raise international funds. She was on November 8, 2010, appointed for a four-year term. Although the position's office is in Paris, France, Jean opted to remain in Canada and base herself out of space provided by the University of Ottawa and rented by the Michaëlle Jean Foundation. In early 2011, Jean made a call for the overhaul of Haiti's education system, as "the cornerstone of the impoverished nation's future prosperity." Also that year, it was announced that Jean had been appointed as Chancellor of the University of Ottawa; she began her term on February 1, 2012, and stepped down in 2015.

In 2023, Jean was announced as the distinguished keynote speaker for Canada's Supporting Women in Film Trades (SWIFT) 2023 Conference held in Winnipeg, Manitoba, Canada. At a SWIFT press conference at Frank Digital's Studio, the event's Executive Director Adam Smoluk praised Jean's accomplishments and stated, "As a woman who made strides in male-dominated fields including politics, journalism, and filmmaking, Jean was a natural choice to headline the conference."

=== Secretary-General of La Francophonie ===
Secretary-General of La Francophonie Abdou Diouf, in April 2011, appointed Jean as the Grand Témoin de la Francophonie for the 2012 Summer Olympics in London, England, with the task of promoting the French language and ensuring compliance by the London Olympic Organising Committee with rule 24 of the Olympic Charter, which gives French the status of an official language of the Olympic Games.

In 2014, the Canadian federal government, along with the provincial governments of Quebec and New Brunswick, as well as the government of Haiti endorsed Jean's candidacy to be Diouf's successor as Secretary-General of La Francophonie. On November 30, 2014, the representatives of governments of the 57-member organization chose Jean for the position by consensus after the four other candidates withdrew.

Her four-year mandate began January 5, 2015, and she has since promoted democratic procedures—particularly in respect to elections in the Central African Republic, Niger, Comoros, and Benin—education, and the rights of women and girls.

Jean sought a mandate for a second four-year term at the 2018 Francophonie Summit in Armenia, however, France and eventually Canada supported the consensus candidate, Rwandan foreign minister Louise Mushikiwabo. Jean has been criticized for expenses such as spending $500,000 to renovate her Paris apartment, a $50,000 bill for four nights at Manhattan's Waldorf-Astoria hotel, the acquisition of a $20,000 piano and the $1-million price tag for a youth-engagement program carried out aboard the replica of a historic 18th century ship, the Hermione.

Jean was defeated in her bid for a second term when the 2018 Francophonie summit held in Armenia agreed, by consensus, to elect Rwandan foreign minister Louise Mushikiwabo as secretary-general. Jean's term in office ended on January 2, 2019.

=== Other activities ===
Jean was named to succeed Jean Paul Gladu as chancellor of St. Paul's University College in late October 2020. The school, which is affiliated with the University of Waterloo, offers programs in Indigenous Studies, International Development, Canadian Studies and Human Rights while also being home to the Waterloo Indigenous Student Centre, the Student Refugee Program, and GreenHouse, a nationally recognized social enterprise incubator.

Jean was given the mandate to revive the Haitian Football Federation from 2021 to 2022 after a sex scandal involving the former president. Jean and her three colleagues were to organize the election of the next FHF executive committee. None of them were eligible for the vacancies.

== Honours ==
Viceregal styles of Michaëlle Jean (2005–2010)
- Reference style: Her Excellency the Right Honourable; Son Excellence la très honorable
- Spoken style: Your Excellency; Votre Excellence

Ribbon bars of Michaëlle Jean

Appointments

- September 27, 2005 – October 1, 2010: Chancellor and Principal Companion of the Order of Canada (CC)
  - October 1, 2010 – May 8, 2013: Companion of the Order of Canada (CC)
  - May 8, 2013 –: Extraordinary Companion of the Order of Canada (CC)
- September 27, 2005 – October 1, 2010: Chancellor and Commander of the Order of Military Merit (CMM)
  - October 1, 2010 – May 8, 2013: Commander of the Order of Military Merit (CMM)
  - May 8, 2013 –: Extraordinary Commander of the Order of Military Merit (CMM)
- September 27, 2005 – October 1, 2010: Chancellor and Commander of the Order of Merit of the Police Forces (COM)
  - October 1, 2010 – : Commander of the Order of Merit of the Police Forces (COM)
- September 27, 2005 – October 1, 2010: Dame of Justice, Prior, and Chief Officer in Canada of the Most Venerable Order of the Hospital of Saint John of Jerusalem (DStJ)
  - October 1, 2010 – : Dame of Justice of the Most Venerable Order of the Hospital of Saint John of Jerusalem (DStJ)
- September 27, 2005 – October 1, 2010: Chief Scout of Canada
- 2005 – : Honorary Member of the Royal Military College of Canada Club
- 2007 – : Honorary Fellow of the Royal College of Physicians and Surgeons of Canada (FRCPSC(hon))
- September 26, 2012 – : Member of the Queen's Privy Council for Canada (PC)

Medals

- September 27, 2005: Canadian Forces' Decoration (CD)
- 2005: Saskatchewan Centennial Medal
- February 6, 2012: Queen Elizabeth II Diamond Jubilee Medal

Awards

- 1989: the Human Rights League of Canada Media Award
- 1989: Fondation Mireille Lanctôt Prix Mireille-Lanctôt
- 1994: Canadian Broadcasting Corporation Prix Anik
- 1995: Amnesty International Canada Journalism Award
- 1997: City of Montreal Citizen of Honour
- 2000: Conseil de la Langue Française du Québec Prix Raymond-Charette
- 2000: Canadian Association of Cable Television Providers Galaxie Award
- 2001: Academy of Canadian Cinema and Television Prix Gémeaux (Best Interview: All Categories)
- 2004: Canadian Broadcasting Corporation French Television Prize
- 2009: Board of Governors Recognition Achievement Award from the National Quality Institute
- 2009: Recipient of the Top 25 Canadian Immigrant Awards
- November 16, 2009: National Quality Institute Recognition of Achievement Award
- 2022: Ottawa Key to the City

Foreign honours

- 1985: Swiss Ambassador to Canada's Prize of Excellence in French and Italian studies
- May 28, 2010: United Nations Development Fund for Women Canada Award
- 2011: Grand Cross of the National Order of the Legion of Honour
- 2003 – July 7, 2014: Knight of the Order of La Pléiade
  - July 7, 2014 – present: Grand Cross of the Order of La Pléiade

=== Honorary military appointments ===
- September 27, 2005 – October 1, 2010: Colonel of the Governor General's Horse Guards
- September 27, 2005 – October 1, 2010: Colonel of the Governor General's Foot Guards
- September 27, 2005 – October 1, 2010: Colonel of the Canadian Grenadier Guards

=== Honorary degrees ===
- June 5, 2006: University of Ottawa, Doctor of the University (D.Univ.)
- July 21, 2006: University for Foreigners Perugia, Doctor of International Relations (DIR)
- November 10, 2006: McGill University, Doctor of Letters (D.Litt.)
- March 25, 2007: Osgoode Hall Law School at York University, Doctor of Laws (LLD)
- June 5, 2007: University of Manitoba, Doctor of Laws (LLD)
- June 10, 2008: University of Alberta, Doctor of Laws (LLD)
- May 23, 2009: Université de Moncton, Doctorate of Letters (DLitt)
- June 14, 2009: Université Laval, Doctor of the University (DUniv)
- May 20, 2010: Royal Military College of Canada, Doctor of Military Science (DMSc)
- May 26, 2010: Université de Montréal, Doctor of Philosophy (PhD)
- February 25, 2011: University of Guelph, Doctor of Laws (LLD)
- November 17, 2011: University of Calgary, Doctor of Laws (LLD)
- 2012: Law Society of Upper Canada, Doctor of Laws (LL.D.)
- November 10, 2012: Carleton University, Doctor of Laws (LL.D.)
- June 15, 2013: DePaul University
- October 24, 2013: NorQuest College, Honorary Diploma
- May 28, 2014: Laurentian University, Doctor of Laws (LL.D.)
- Early 2019: Dalhousie University, Doctor of Laws (LL.D.)

=== Honorific eponyms ===
Awards

- Michaëlle Jean and Jean-Daniel Lafond Endowment Fund for Social Communication Studies
- Michaëlle Jean Emergency Hunger Relief Award

Geographic locations

- Michaëlle Jean Park, Winnipeg

Schools

- École Élémentaire Michaëlle Jean, Binbrook
- Michaëlle Jean Public School, Barrhaven
- Michaëlle Jean Public School, Richmond Hill

Flora

- Michaëlle Jean tulip

=== Arms ===
Coat of arms of Michaëlle Jean
Notes Just prior to her installation as Governor General, Jean was granted a personal coat of arms that depicted her Haitian roots. Adopted September 1, 2005 Crest A sea shell Or entoured by a chain its ends broken Sable Escutcheon Sable a sand dollar ensigned by the Royal Crown Or Supporters Two Simbis Or queued and crined Sable each sounding a sea shell Or Compartment Issuant from barry wavy Or and Sable set before a rocky mound proper growing thereon to the dexter a palm tree and to the sinister a pine tree Or Motto BRISER LES SOLITUDES (Eliminating isolation) Orders The ribbon and insignia of a Companion of the Order of Canada. DESIDERANTES MELIOREM PATRIAM (They desire a better country) Symbolism The shield shows a sand dollar, a special talisman for Jean, and the Crown symbolising her viceregal authority. The shell in a broken chain refers to Albert Mangonès' sculpture in Port-au-Prince, Le Marron Inconnu, which depicts an escaped slave blowing a sea shell to call to arms his fellow enslaved people; this symbolises Jean's ancestors' escape from slavery. The two Simbis are Haitian Vodou water spirits with the power to calm rough seas and give wisdom; they stand in before a rocky terrain upon which are rooted a palm tree—a Haitian symbol of peace—and a pine tree—representative of the natural riches of Canada.

== See also ==
- Haitian Canadian
- Immigration to Canada
- List of elected and appointed female heads of state

== Notes ==
Government offices
Preceded by Adrienne Clarkson	Governor General of Canada; 2005–2010	Succeeded by David Johnston
Diplomatic posts
Preceded by Abdou Diouf	Secretary General of the La Francophonie; 2015–2019	Succeeded by Louise Mushikiwabo
Academic offices
Preceded by Huguette Labelle	Chancellor of the University of Ottawa; 2012–2015	Succeeded by Calin Rovinescu
Order of precedence
Preceded by Adrienne Clarkson as former governor general	Canadian order of precedence	Succeeded by David Johnston as former governor general
