= Marie-Laurence Josselyn Lassègue =

Haitian journalist and politician (b. 1955)

Minister on the Status and Rights of Women in Haiti
- In office 2006–2015
- President: René Préval (2006–2011); Michel Martelly (2011–2015)
- Preceded by: Adeline Magloire Chancy
- Succeeded by: Gabrielle Hyacinthe

Personal details
- Born: 1 March 1955 (age 71) Port-au-Prince, Haiti
- Occupation: Teacher, journalist, politician

Marie-Laurence Josselyn Lassègue (born 1 March 1955) is a Haitian journalist, feminist and politician.

== Biography ==
=== Early life and career ===
Marie-Laurence Josselyn Lassègue was born on 1 March 1955 in Port-au-Prince. She spent her childhood in Zaire after her parents fled the dictatorship of François Duvalier. After graduating with her baccalauréat, she continued her studies in France. She earned a master's degree in literature from the University of Franche-Comté and a degree in legal science from the Université Publique du Sud in Les Cayes, Haiti. While in France, Lassègue joined the feminist movement. Following the rape of two of her friends, she became a volunteer worker with SOS femmes battues violées in Strasbourg from 1975 to 1978. At the age of 25, she co-founded the Solidarité femme women's shelter in Besançon, which ran from 1980 to 1983.

Lassègue began her professional life as a teacher in 1978 when she returned to Africa; she taught literature at the Lycée Français in Kinshasa. Once she had returned to her native country, she joined the French lycée in Port-au-Prince from 1983 to 1985, then taught literature at the Ecole Normale Supérieure and the Ecole Nationale des Arts from 1983 to 1990. Alongside her teaching duties, she also worked as a journalist, first for Télé-Haïti from 1983 to 1986. She then worked as a reporter for Radio-Antilles from 1986 to 1989 and as editor-in-chief of Haïti Libérée from 1986 to 1987. During this period, she was General Secretary of the Haitian journalists' union.

=== Political career ===
Lassègue entered politics in February 1991, when she was appointed as Minister of Information and Culture of the Republic of Haiti under the government of Jean-Bertrand Aristide and René Préval. She held this post until August 1993. She went into exile in Washington D.C. and then Belgium following the coup d'état that overthrew President Aristide. In October 1994, she returned to visit the grave of her father, who had died while in exile, and was about to leave again when she learned that she had been unanimously elected by the Senate to represent them on the Provisional Electoral Council. She took the oath of office in December 1995 but resigned a little later for ethical reasons. She became a member of the cabinet of the first woman prime minister, Claudette Werleigh, in 1995, and a member of the cabinet of President Réné Préval from 1996 to 2000.

In 1996, she chaired the Humanitaire Solidarité association, and since then she has been a member of the board of directors of La Maison Arc-en-ciel (an orphanage for children suffering from AIDS) and a member of the Haitian association for the blind. In 1999, she founded Famn Yo La, a Haitian women's collective campaigning for women's political participation and involvement in decision-making.

In 2006, Lassègue became Minister for the Status and Rights of Women, replacing outgoing Minister Adeline Magloire Chancy. In 2012, she oversaw the Haitian parliament's ratification of a bill aimed at making fathers responsible for delinquency.

Since January 2012, she has been Director of the Haiti Programme of the International Institute for Democracy and Electoral Assistance.
