= Pédrica Saint-Jean =

Haitian diplomat and politician

Minister on the Status and Rights of Women
- Incumbent
- Assumed office 16 November 2024
- Prime Minister: Alix Didier Fils-Aimé (acting)
- Preceded by: Marie-Françoise Suzan

Pédrica Saint-Jean is a Haitian diplomat and politician, Minister on the Status and Rights of Women of Haiti since 2024.

== Career ==
Saint-Jean has training as a diplomat and in 2019 was the chief of protocol for the Chamber of Deputies. She coordinates the Haitian League of Women Renewers.

In July 2019, she was seriously shot in the torso during an armed attack while traveling in the vehicle of deputy Printemps Bélizaire. On 6 August 2024 she escaped from an attempted murder attack while traveling to a meeting of the Provisional Electoral Council.

On 15 November 2024, Saint-Jean was announced as the new Minister on the Status and Rights of Women of the transitional cabinet of Alix Didier Fils-Aimé. She was sworn in on 16 November. In 2025, Saint-Jean called for greater participation by women in decision-making.
