= National Day of the Women's Movement in Haiti =

Annual national feminist observance

National Day of the Women's Movement in Haiti is an annual event on April 3 commemorating the first major feminist march in Haiti, organized in 1986 to demand women’s rights and gender equality in the country. The day marks reflection and action for women’s organizations and activists engaged in the struggle for women’s empowerment in Haiti.

== Origins and history ==
On April 3, 1986, almost two months after the fall of the Duvalier dictatorship, 30,000 women marched through the streets of the Haitian capital Port-au-Prince to denounce violence, discrimination, and the exclusion of women in Haitian society. The event marked a turning point in the history of the Haitian feminist movement and led to the implementation of several initiatives in support of women’s rights, notably the adoption of laws aimed at combating inequality.

== Celebrations ==
Every year on April 3, women’s organizations and government institutions organize conferences, debates, and awareness campaigns on women’s rights in Haiti. This day also serves as an opportunity to reflect on the progress made while highlighting the persistent challenges in the fight for gender equality and the inclusion of women in the country’s political and economic spheres. The National Day of the Women's Movement in Haiti has helped strengthen the mobilization of women’s organizations and promote the adoption of public policies that benefit women. However, activists have emphasized there remains a need for further efforts to ensure true gender equality and better protection of women’s rights in Haiti.

A 2016 press release from the "Haitian National Red Cross Society" highlighted the importance of this day in strengthening solidarity among Haitian women and promoting collective action toward a more equitable society. It also called for greater involvement by public authorities and international partners to ensure the effective realization of women’s rights in Haiti.

== See also ==
- Solidarite Fanm Ayisyèn
