= List of mayors of Port-au-Prince =

Mayor of Port-au-Prince
- Président de la Commission communale de Port-au-Prince
- Incumbent; Lucsonne Janvier since July 9, 2020
- Inaugural holder: Michel-Joseph Leremboure (1720 1804)
- Formation: March 3, 1791

The following is a list of the mayors and leaders of the city of Port-au-Prince, Haiti.

== List ==
- Thomas-Antoine de Mauduit du Plessis 1787-3 March 1791
- Michel-Joseph Leremboure (1720-1804) 3 March 1791 – 1792:
- Bernard Borgella de Pensié 1792
- Jean Paul (1843), mayor of Port-au-Prince under Charles Rivière-Hérard
- Noël Piron (1844), magistrate of Port-au-Prince under Philippe Guerrier
- Jules Saint-Macary (1880s), magistrate of Port-au-Prince under Lysius Salomon
- Etienne Mathon (1896–1899), magistrate of Port-au-Prince under Tirésias Simon Sam
- Sténio Vincent (1907–1909)
- Clément Magloire (1922–1930), prefect of Port-au-Prince under Louis Borno (born about 1880, owner of Le Matin (Haiti)
- Raphaël Brouard (1938–1940)
- Silvio Cator (1946)
- Nélaton Camille (1952–1955)
- Windsor Kléber Laferrière (1957)
- Jean Deeb (1960)
- Marc Pierre Exantus (1981–1988)
- Franck Romain (1988)
- Carmen Christophe (1988)
- Widner Gérard Vital-Herne, November 28, 1990
- Irene Ridoré (1991)
- Evans Paul (1991)
- Gerald Solomon (1991–1994)
- Evans Paul (1994–1995)
- Manno Charlemagne (1995–2000)
- Ginette Pomponneau Duperval (2000–2002)
- Rassoul Labuchin (2002–2004)
- Carline Simon (2004–2007)
- Jean Yves Jason (2007–2012)
- Municipal Commission (Gabrielle Hyacinthe, assisted in his duties by Jean-Marie Descorbettes and Junior Gérald Estimé) (2012–2012)
- Marie-Josephe René (President of the Interim Municipal Commission) (2012–2013)
- Pierre-Richard Duplan (Chairman of the Interim Municipal Commission) (2013–2016)
- Ralph Youri Chevry (2016–2020)
- Lucsonne Janvier (since July 2020)
