= Lise-Marie Déjean =

Haitian Organizer

Minister on the Status and Rights of Women in Haiti
- In office 4 November 1994 – 7 February 1996
- President: Jean-Bertrand Aristide
- Prime Minister: Smarck Michel (1994–1995); Claudette Werleigh (1995–1996)

Personal details
- Born: 1940s

Lise-Marie Déjean is a Haitian women's rights defender and organizer who served as the first minister of the Ministry on the Status and Rights of Women in Haiti.

== Life ==
Lise-Marie Déjean was born in the 1940s. She studied to become a physician in Spain and used her medical skills to work in urban health in New York City and with women throughout rural Haiti and in Port-au-Prince metropolitan area. In her work in Haiti, she noticed the high maternal mortality rates which made her recognize the magnitude of gender discrimination and lack of reproductive rights in the country. She joined Haitian Women's Solidarity (Solidarite Fanm Ayisyèn, SOFA), a major Haitian women's organization, soon after its founding in 1987. She has served in several roles throughout her 35-year participation in SOFA, including that of national coordinator and coordinator of women's health programming. As a long-term member of SOFA's coordinating committee, she helped open women's clinics in marginalized neighborhoods (slums) throughout the country.

Alongside many feminists in the Haitian women's movement and in Latin American and Caribbean region, Déjean worked towards the creation of a national ministry devoted to women's rights. The International Conference on Population and Development in Cairo in 1994 was a key event leading up to the founding of the Haitian women's ministry as it spurred international support for the effort. The Ministry on the Status and Rights of Women in Haiti (Ministère à la Condition féminine et aux Droit des femmes, MCFDF) was founded on 8 November 1994. Dr. Déjean was appointed to the cabinet post of minister and served until the end of Jean-Bertrand Aristide's first administration in 1996. Throughout her one-year tenure as minister and thereafter, she has been vocal about the need for citizen participation, political will within the three branches of government, and public sector funding in the struggle for gender equality.
