= Gabrielle Hyacinthe =

Haitian politician

Minister for the Status of Women and Women's Rights
- In office November 2015 – c. 2017
- Prime Minister: Evans Paul
- Preceded by: Marie-Laurence Josselyn Lassègue
- Succeeded by: Evelyne Sainvil

Gabrielle Hyacinthe is a Haitian politician who held a number of offices under the presidency of Michel Martelly and subsequent provisional governments.

== Political career ==
In February 2012, Hyacinthe was appointed by President Michel Martelly to head the municipal commission of Port-au-Prince, making her the de facto mayor of the city. In August of the same year, she was appointed Director General of the Permanent Electoral Council, from which she aimed to improve political transparency and oversee free and fair elections in the country. In January 2014, she was dismissed from her post without explanation. In April 2014, she was appointed Secretary of State for Youth and Civic Action, a post from which she aimed to support youth employment initiatives and encourage greater civic engagement among young people. In November 2015, she became Minister for the Status of Women and Women's Rights in the provisional government led by Evans Paul.
