= Yvonne Hakim-Rimpel =

Haitian feminist journalist

Yvonne Hakim-Rimpel (Portu-au-Prince, 1906 – June 28, 1986) was a Haitian feminist journalist and co-founder of Haiti's first feminist organization, the Ligue Féminine d'Action Sociale. A critic of president François Duvalier, she was one of the first victims of the Duvalier dictatorship.

== Biography ==
Yvonne Hakim-Rimpel was born in 1906 in Port-au-Prince, the daughter of Marie Louise Horatia Benjamin and Eli Abdallah Hakim. Very young, at age 14, she was forced to marry the groom her parents had chosen for her. From this marriage, she had 4 children, one of whom was stillborn. She was divorced the first time, remarried twice after that, and had 5 more children. By continuing and finishing her studies on her own, Yvonne freed herself from social norms and the rules dictated by her parents, namely by attending literary salons. Influenced by Paul Savain, she eventually studied law.

In 1934, she co-founded the Ligue Féminine d'Action Sociale, the first feminist association in Haiti, of which she was an active activist. The league promotes women's emancipation and equality through various actions, such as meetings, demonstrations and petitions (such as women's access to school), but also more concrete and direct actions, such as civic education for women, dismissal from school night club for working women and the opening of libraries.

In 1935, a newspaper of the League appeared, La Voix des femmes, a journal of expression for women, of which Yvonne was one of the main editors. In 1951, she founded L'Escale, a bimonthly magazine intended to be completely free, where she expressed herself or criticized writers, journalists and politicians in particular. She also strongly mobilized, through her League, for the expansion of women's right to vote, which resulted in the achievement of political equality between men and women in August 1957 and, therefore, women's right to vote.

In 1957, presidential elections were held in Haiti, in which she supported and actively participated in the campaign of the candidate Louis Déjoie. During that time, she published in her magazine the article "A moi général, deux mots", which denounced the actions of General Antonio Kébreau, who ensured the victory of the candidate François Duvalier.

At Christmas of that year, Yvonne criticized the already established Duvalier government in the article "Peuple à genoux, attends ta délivrance", where she protests against the arrest of Gilberte "Boubou" Vieux. This would be Yvonne's last publication in L'Escale.

On the night of January 5, 1958, while at home with her children, Yvonne Hakim-Rimpel was the victim of a violent attack: she and her two daughters were beaten, then Yvonne was kidnapped. She was found the next day on a road with injuries and signs of sexual assault. This event follows the publication of his criticisms of the government. The men sent to Yvonne Hakim-Rimpel would have acted under the orders of Duvalier, then head of the country. The event is publicized and the Women's League is outraged by publishing a protest note signed by 36 women. Thanks to strong mobilization from the league, humanitarian associations and the press, an investigation was opened four months after the events; an investigation closed some time later due to a lack of evidence.

Four years later, with more and more complaints from national and international opinion about the crimes of the Duvalier regime, the Yvonne case is back in the spotlight. To get a good face for the regime, she was summoned by General Jean Tassy to Fort Dimanche, where Yvonne signed, whether she liked it or not, a disclaimer exempting Duvalierist authorities from responsibility for attack of Yvonne.

She died on June 28, 1986, of a heart attack, some time after she said goodbye to the press.

== In culture ==
On Camille-Léon Street, in Port-au-Prince, there is graffiti done in her memory, made on the initiative of the foundation Devoir de Mémoire Haïti. The romance Femmes au temps des carnassiers from the writer Marie-Celie Agnant It was inspired by the life of Yvonne Hakim-Rimpel.

In 2009, the journalist Liliane Pierre-Paul received the Yvonne Hakim-Rimpel Award.
