= Solidarite Fanm Ayisyèn =

Hatian Women Organization

Solidarite Fanm Ayisyèn (SOFA) is a feminist organization working to promote and defend the rights of women in Haiti. The organization unites women in the countryside, in the working-class neighborhoods of the cities, and women within the universities and businesses.

== History ==
With the fall of the François Duvalier regime on Haiti in 1986, the feminist movement renewed itself considerably. More than 30,000 women took to the streets on 3 April 1986 in Port-au-Prince, the country's capital, to demand equal access to fundamental rights, work and health. The movement led to the creation of many feminist organizations in the country, including SOFA. Founded on 22 February 1986, its mission is to fight for Haitian women to be freed from subordination, domination, exclusion and exploitation. To fulfill this mission, it works on several levels, such as accompanying victims of gender based violence. It also works to make women mobile and autonomous, by concrete tools such as gran mills, textile workshops and a feminist farm school. At the same time, it advocates around issues related to sexism and patriarchal exclusion.

After having joined SOFA in 1987, Lise-Marie Déjean worked for the creation of the Ministry on the Status and Rights of Women in Haiti and became its first minister. Since 2017, SOFA has been led by Sabine Lamour, a sociologist with a PhD in sociology from Université Paris 8. She has a five-year mandate together with Monique Jeanty as secretary-general and Marie Bernardine Jeudi as treasurer. They started their mandate on 7 December 2017.

SOFA is a member of several national and international groups for promoting and defending the rights of women, and have participated in several international movements such as the Marche mondiale des Femmes in 2000.

== See also ==
- Women in Haiti
- National Day of the Women's Movement in Haiti
