= Léonie Coicou Madiou =

Haitian feminist activist, educator, & artist (1891–1974)

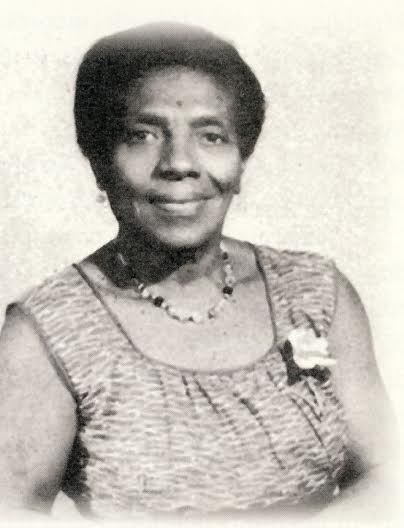
Léonie Coicou Madiou

Léonie Coicou Madiou (1891 – 1974) was a Haitian teacher, actress, political activist and feminist. In 1955, she was the first woman to be elected mayor of Port-au-Prince, Haiti.

== Early life ==
Léonie Coicou was born in Petion-Ville, Haiti, the daughter of Lisebonne Joseph and Masillon Coicou, a poet, playwright, author and diplomat. The latter was, for a time, chargé d'affaires of the Haitian embassy in Paris and so his daughter studied in France. On their return to Haiti, her father and his two brothers, Horace and Pierre-Louis Coicou, were executed in 1908 for planning to overthrow the President Pierre Nord Alexis.

== Career ==
=== Teacher ===
After the death of her father and two uncles, Coicou Madiou became a teacher and, later, headmistress of the École des Filles (girls school), now renamed the Thomas Madiou School in memory of the Haitian historian.

=== Actress ===
Masillon Coicou wrote a play titled Liberté when he was a diplomat in Paris. In 1904, his daughter played the role of Petit Sim in it at the Cluny Theatre in Paris. She also acted in plays in Haiti; in Torrent (May 18, 1940) which won the Grand Prize for Playwriting from the President of the Republic, and in La Famille des Petites-Caille, Triumph of the Earth, Sanite Bélair (August 10, 1942 ) Min Coyo (1943), Barrières<(1945) and Lococia

=== Activist ===
Coicou Madiou was an active member of the Women's League of Social Action (LFAS), which was founded in 1934 and which is mentioned in Women in Haiti in the section on the history of the Haitian Women's Movement. She also became the deputy secretary of the Comité d'Action Féminine (CAF), established in 1946. In 1947, she was appointed to the Conciliation and Arbitration Division of the Haiti Labor Office and, with Denyse Guillaume, created a women's section for the protection of mothers and children. In 1950, she was arrested and beaten while demonstrating for women's political rights and was put in prison in January, 1946 and May, 1957. In 1955, she was the first woman to be elected mayor of Port-au-Prince five years after Haitian women won the right to vote in municipal elections.

== Personal life ==
Coicou Madiou was married to Justin Madiou. They had eight children.

== Awards ==
Léonie Coicou Madiou was awarded the National Order of Honour and Merit, the highest merit awarded by the Haitian president, by President Sténo Vincent for her contribution to the training of young people. She was also awarded the Order of Toussaint-Louverture by President François Duvalier.
