= Michaëlle Jean Foundation =

Canadian non-profit organization

The Michaëlle Jean Foundation is a non-profit organization established by former Governor General of Canada Michaëlle Jean upon her retirement from that position in 2010. Its aim is to collaborate with other Canadian organizations across Canada to work with disadvantaged youth and effect change in their communities through the arts. The co-presidents of the foundation are Michaëlle Jean and her husband Jean-Daniel Lafond who also is CEO.

The foundation was established with a contribution of $3 million as by the Canadian Crown-in-Council as a legacy gift and is further funded by private donations, with up to $7 million in matching funds to be provided by the federal Department of Canadian Heritage.
