= Ann Valérie Timothée Milfort =

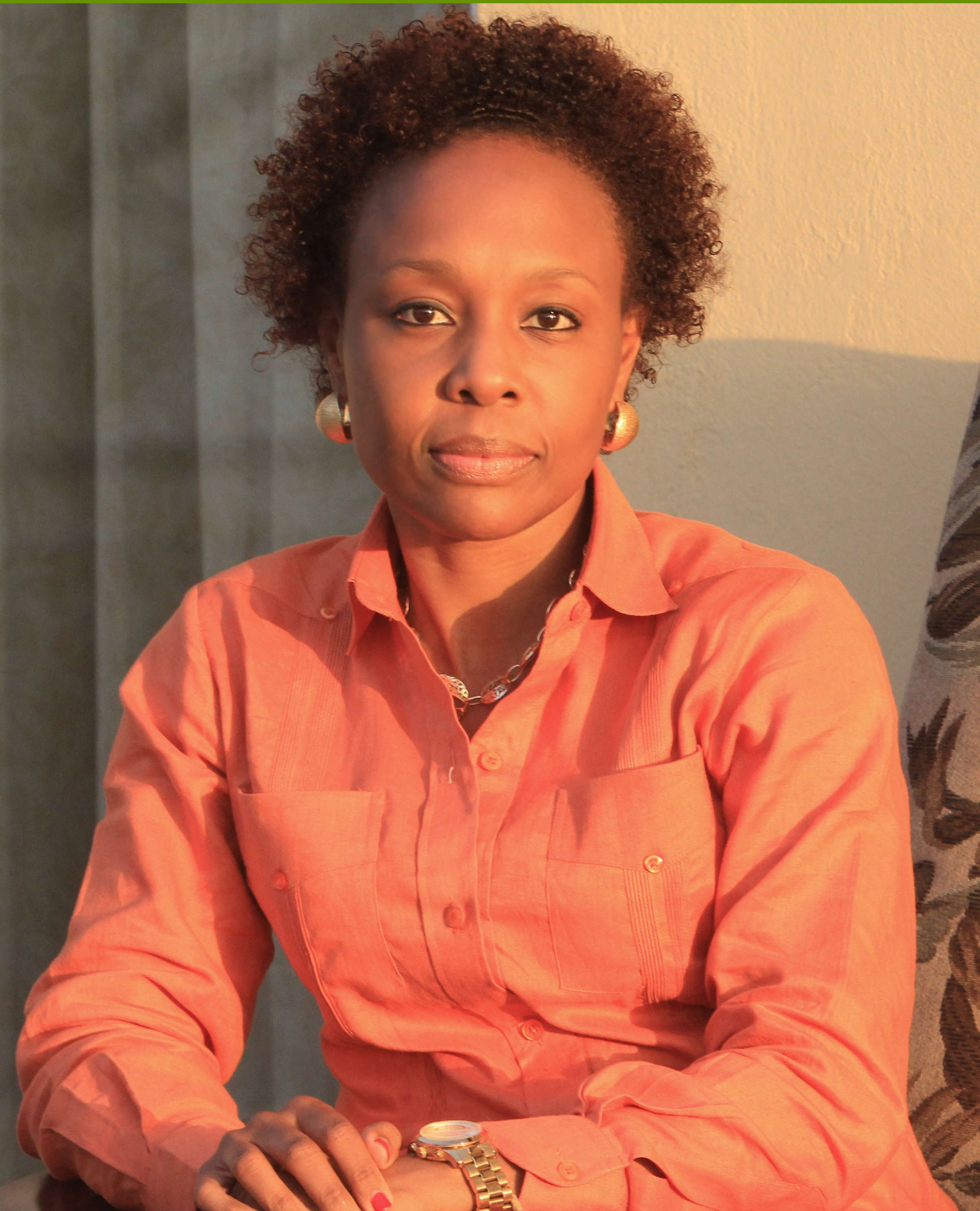

Chief of Staff of Haitian Presidency
- In office 2012 – 7 February 2016
- President: Michel Martelly

Personal details
- Born: 1973; Belgium
- Political party: Parti haïtien Tèt Kale
- Children: 2

Ann Valérie Timothée Milfort (French pronunciation: [an valeʁi timɔte milfɔʁ], born 1973 in Belgium), is the cabinet chief of staff of Haiti. She is the current president of Parti Haïtien Tèt Kale (PHTK).

== Early life and education ==
Former student of Sisters of St. Joseph of Cluny, Milfort has a degree in social sciences and mathematics from collège Jean-de-Brébeuf in Montréal during 1991 and 1992. She entered Université de Montréal in 1992, earning a bachelor's degree in economics in 1996. She earned a master's degree from Florida International University in 1997 and a gender and human rights master's degree from Rutgers University, Edward J. Bloustein School of Public Policy and Urban Planning in 2005.

== Professional and political career ==
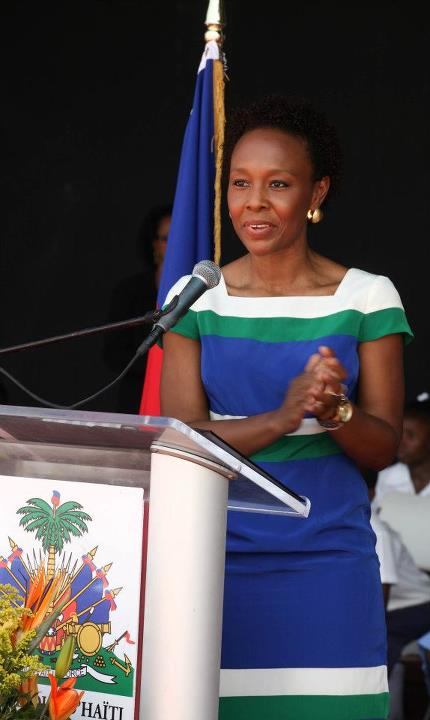
Milfort, during a speech in Haiti

Senior technical advisor to the Cabinet of Minister for the Status and Rights of Women from 2006 to 2010, she also lent her services as an independent consultant on women's issues for various non-governmental organizations and the Haitian private sector. With the support of the V-Day Foundation, Milfort contributed, as coordinator, to the implementation of the first shelter center run by the State for battered and abused women. She also framed and encouraged women to mount grassroots organizations and labored to relieve the suffering of women with H.I.V.

After the 2011 elections, she became coordinator of the Office of the First Lady of the Republic. She was then called to the Interim Commission for the Reconstruction of Haiti (IHRC) as executive director from July 2011 to February 2012. From that date, she successively held the positions of deputy director and director of the President's Office of the Republic of Haiti.

== Personal life ==
Milfort is fluent in French, Haitian Creole and English. Milfort is married and has two children.
