= Max Chancy =

Haitian trade unionist and intellectual (1928–2002)

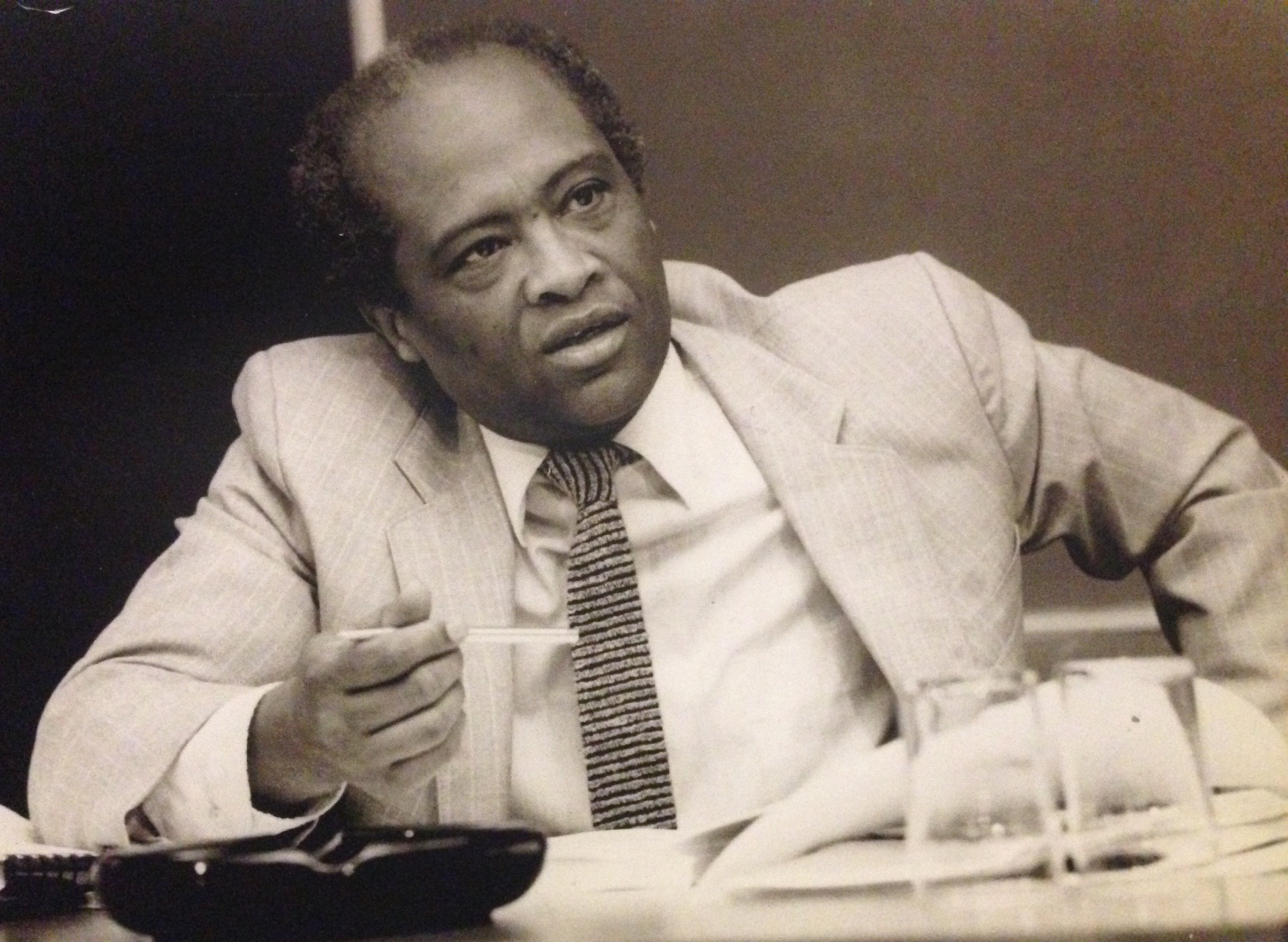
The Haitian activist Max Chancy.

Max Chancy (May 9, 1928 – March 25, 2002) was a Haitian intellectual, labor leader, and political activist.

Chancy was a co-founder of the Centre d’Études Secondaires and of a major teachers' union in Haiti. He participated in the leftist resistance to the Duvalier dictatorship and was exiled to Canada in the 1960s, where he continued his political and educational work, before returning to Haiti after the dictatorship's fall.

== Early life ==
Max Chancy was born in Port-au-Prince, Haiti, in 1928. He studied at the l'École normale supérieure at the Université d'État d'Haïti, and he also obtained a philosophy degree from the Sorbonne in France and a doctorate in philosophy from the University of Mainz in Germany.

== Career ==
After completing his university studies in Europe, Chancy returned to Haiti and taught at the Université d'État d'Haïti as well as Toussaint Louverture High School. In 1954, he co-founded the Centre d’Études Secondaires, a distinguished school in Port-au-Prince.

In parallel to his educational activities, Chancy was also engaged in syndicalism, and he was one of the founding members of Haiti's national secondary school teachers' union, UNMES. He also fought against the dictatorship of François Duvalier, joining the Marxist-Leninist People's Party of National Liberation and subsequently the Unified Party of Haitian Communists. He was arrested and tortured by the authorities in 1963.

After being released, he was exiled to Canada alongside his family, settling as political refugees in Outremont, Montreal, in 1965.

In Canada, Chancy continued his work as an educator, teaching philosophy at Cégep Édouard-Montpetit from 1970 until 1985 and lecturing at the Université du Québec à Montréal from 1973 until 1977. In 1980, he became a member of Quebec's Council of Education, where he oversaw various committees, notably one on "Quebecois Schools and Cultural Communities." His work on this committee led to the "Chancy Report," which introduced the concept of intercultural education for the first time in the province.

He also continued his trade unionist work, including through the 1974 International Conference of Worker Solidarity, alongside Michel Chartrand.

Chancy continued to engage with Haiti's educational system from afar. Along with his wife, fellow educator and activist Adeline Magloire Chancy, he helped found the Maison d'Haïti, an organization dedicated to education, in Montreal in 1972.

After Jean-Claude Duvalier was ousted in 1986, Chancy returned to Haiti. He died in Pétion-Ville in 2002, after a long illness.

== Personal life ==
Max Chancy married Adeline Magloire Chancy, a feminist activist, educator, and public servant, in 1955. The couple had three sons: Bernard Chancy, Jean-Pierre Chancy, and Michel Chancy.
