= Adeline Magloire Chancy =

Haitian educator, feminist, and politician (born 1931)

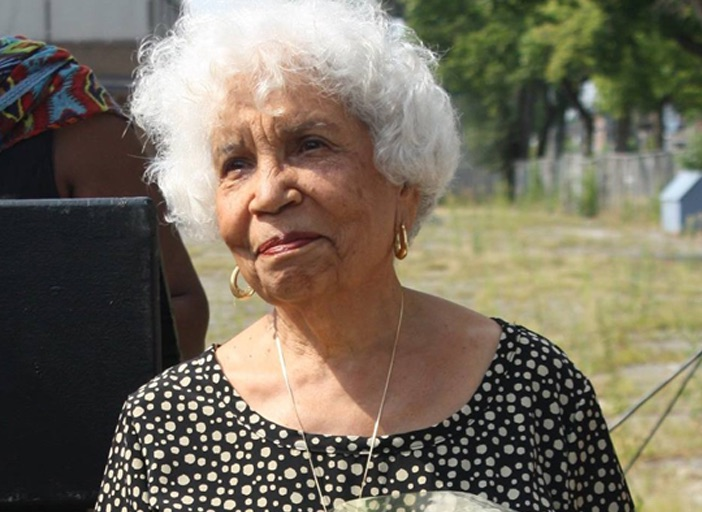
- Adeline Chancy in 2018

Minister on the Status and Rights of Women in Haiti
- In office 29 February 2004 – 14 May 2006
- President: Boniface Alexandre
- Prime Minister: Gérard Latortue
- Succeeded by: Marie-Laurence Josselyn Lassègue

Personal details
- Born: Adeline Magloire; 4 April 1931 (age 95) Port-au-Prince, Haiti
- Spouse: Max Chancy (m. 1955; died 2002)
- Children: Bernard Chancy; Jean-Pierre Chancy; Michel Chancy
- Education: Université d'État d'Haïti

Adeline Magloire Chancy (born 4 April 1931) is a Haitian educator, feminist, and politician. She has worked to promote the recognition of Haitian Creole as a valid language in its own right.

Chancy is a founding member of the Haitian Creole Academy and served as Haiti's minister for the feminine condition and women's rights from 2004 to 2006.

== Early life ==
Adeline Magloire was born in 1931 in Port-au-Prince, Haiti, and grew up in the suburb of Pétion-Ville. Her father was an architect and her mother was a teacher. Her sisters were Nicole Magloire and Denise Magloire Fouchard, both of whom also became feminist activists.

Chancy studied at L'École Normale Supérieure, a constituent school of the Université d'État d'Haïti, as well as at the university's law school.

== Career ==
In the early 1960s, Chancy became an activist for democracy and women's rights under the Duvalier dictatorship, organizing with the Committee of Patriotic Women and the Unified Democratic Front. This period shaped her advocacy for Haitian Creole:

It was at this time, amid a climate of political repression that left a mark on my blood, that I came to understand the role of our national language in the struggle to establish a democratic political regime and to pave the way for progress, development, and national unity.

Chancy was forced to go into exile with her family in 1965, and they settled in Canada, taking up residence in Montreal's Outremont neighborhood. Their home became a center of community organizing for Haitians in Montreal, as well as a haven for new arrivals from many countries.

In Montreal, while pursuing a professional career in secondary education, Chancy continued her social and political activism both within the Haitian community and across Quebec society. She was chosen by the Government of Quebec to take part in a commission overseeing the implementation of immigrant integration policies. She also worked with the provincial human rights commission on issues of racism.

Chancy was a pioneer in literacy efforts through the Maison d'Haïti in Montreal, which she helped found, and the provincial-level literacy organization Regroupement des Groupes populaires en alphabétisation. She helped shape literacy and adult education policy, both directly through her teaching as well as through conferences and publications. She received a master's degree in adult education from the University of Montreal in 1981, writing her thesis on illiteracy among Haitian women immigrants.

In the 1970s and 1980s, Chancy was a member of the Congress of Black Women of Canada. She also advocated for the recognition and validation of the Haitian Creole language. In 1983, she launched the first International Creole Day in Montreal, on October 28.

Chancy returned to Haiti after Jean-Claude Duvalier went into exile in 1986. Since then, she has held several positions in the public sector, including training director at the National Office for Participation and Popular Education from 1986 to 1987, secretary of state for literacy from 1996 to 1997, and minister for the feminine condition and women's rights from 2004 to 2006. A noteworthy accomplishment during her time as women's minister was the July 6, 2005, declaration that recognized rape as a crime and that abolished discriminatory provisions against women in the Penal Code.

She has written extensively on women's rights, literacy, and Haitian Creole. In November 2014, Chancy was named a knight of the French Legion of Honour.

== Personal life ==
She married Max Chancy, a philosophy professor and political activist, in 1955. He died in 2002. The couple had three sons: Bernard Chancy, Jean-Pierre Chancy, and Michel Chancy.

== Selected works ==
- 1982: Lagramè, Grammaire créole, Maison d’Haïti, Montréal, 1982.
- 1986: Faut-il nommer le racisme ?, Montréal, CIDIHCA
- 1994: Batay pou alfabetizasyon se batay pou dwa fondamantal pèp la, Colloque 10ème : Education en Haïti, pp 28–39, New York, 1994.
- 2002: Jounen Entènasyonal Lang Kreyòl, Inauguration du mois de Créole, Montréal, October 28, 2002.
