= Ministry on the Status and Rights of Women =

Government minister of Haiti

- Ministère à la Condition féminine et aux Droits des femmes Ministè Kondisyon Feminin ak Dwa Fanm yo
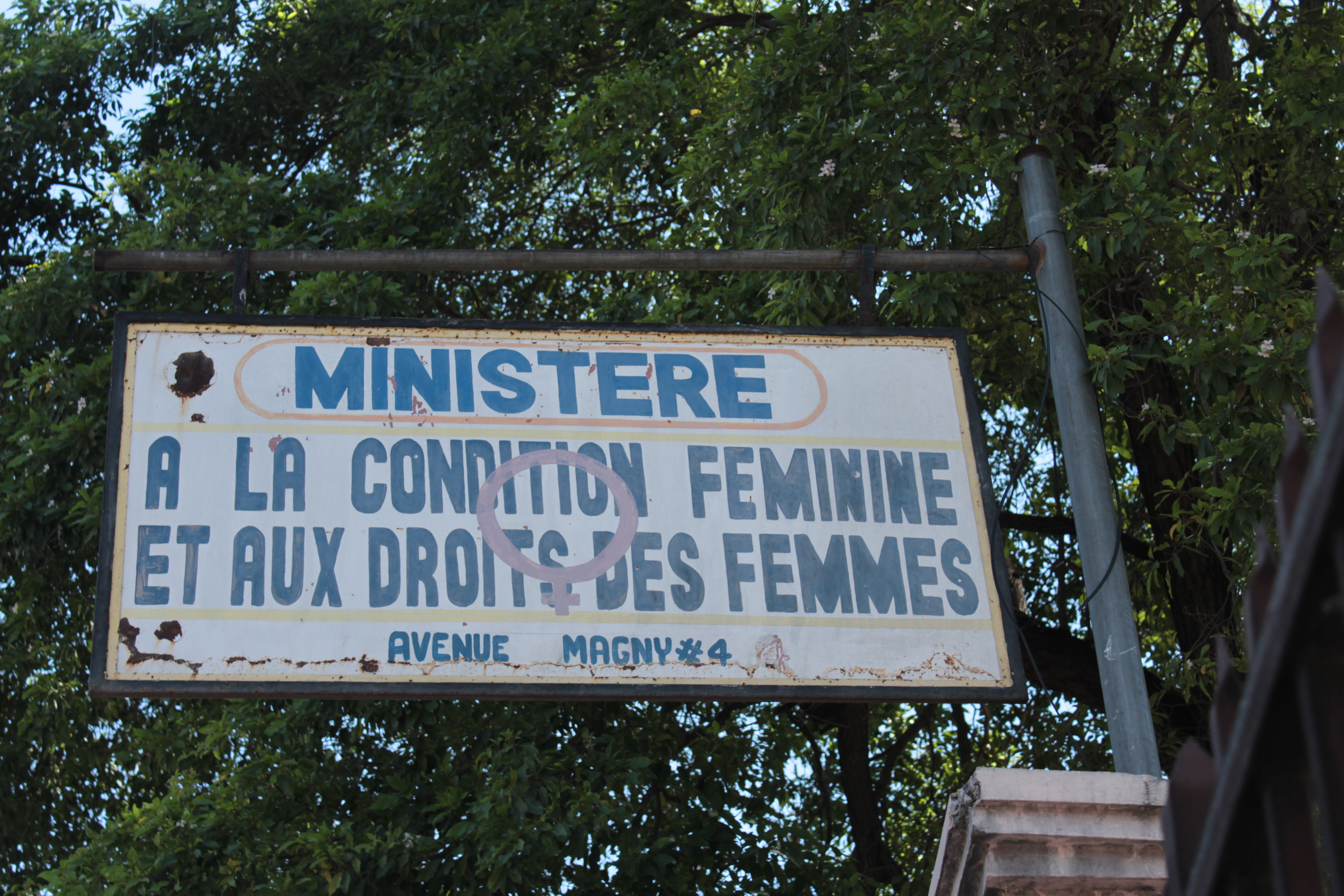

Ministry overview
- Formed: 8 November 1994; 31 years ago
- Headquarters: Port-au-Prince
- Minister responsible: Pédrica Saint-Jean

The Ministry on the Status and Rights of Women (French: Ministère à la Condition féminine et aux Droits des femmes; MCFDF) is a ministry in Haiti, founded on 8 November 1994 with the mission to work for the emergence of an egalitarian society with equality between men and women.

== History ==
MCFDF is a result of demands from Haitian women, and was created as part of the preparatory work for the World Conference on Women, 1995. It was created by decree on 8 November 1994 and gave itself two functions in 2004: to defend and promote the rights of women and to promote gender analyses.

Lise Marie Déjean, one of the co-founders of Solidarite Fanm Ayisyèn, worked for the creation of the ministry, and was also named the first minister. The last minister, before the collapse of the government of Ariel Henry in 2024, was Sofia Loréus.

== Structures ==
MCFDF consists of two structures:

=== Central services ===
- The Secretariat of the minister
- The Cabinet of the minister
- The General Directorate
- The Management

=== Decentralized services ===
Each geographic department of the country, according to the decree, has a departmental management working to coordinate the regional services of the ministry.

== List of ministers ==
- Lise-Marie Déjean (1994–1996)
- Adeline Magloire Chancy (2004–2006)
- Marie-Laurence Josselyn Lassègue (2006–2015)
- Gabrielle Hyacinthe (2015–2018)
- Evelyne Sainvil (2018–2020)
- Marie Ghislaine Mompremier (2020–2021)
- Sofia Loréus (2021–2024)
- Marie-Françoise Suzan (2024-2024)
- Pédreca Saint-Jean (2024-present)
