= Magalie Marcelin =

Haitian feminist, lawyer and actress

Magalie Marcelin (1962 – January 12, 2010) was a Haitian feminist, lawyer and actress.

While still in her teens, she performed with a theatre group which used the stage as a medium to raise issues about women's rights and social justice. Marcelin was expelled by the government of Jean-Claude Duvalier. She was sent to Venezuela, came to Montreal in 1981 and studied law. Marcelin returned to Haiti after Duvalier's departure in 1986.

In 1987, she established Kay Fanm (Women's House), a shelter for battered women and women's rights organization. She also helped ensure that women in legal difficulties related to gender-based violence received a fair trial, working pro bono. Marcelin worked as a consultant for a number of development projects. In 1997, she helped organize an international tribunal in Haiti dealing with violence against women.

Marcelin appeared in the films Haiti in all our dreams and Anita.

She was the godparent of the daughter of former Canadian Governor General Michaëlle Jean.

Marcelin died at the age of 47 at Port-au-Prince in the 2010 Haiti earthquake.
