= Alice Téligny Mathon =

Alice Téligny Mathon was a Haitian feminist, active in the 1920s and 1930s. She was an inaugural member of the Inter-American Commission of Women in 1928 and on 3 March 1934 co-founded the Feminine League for Social Action in Haiti. Other founding members of the League were Fernande Bellegarde, Marie Corvington, Esther Dartigue, Alice Garoute, Olga Gordon, Thérèse Hudicourt, Georgette Justin, Madeleine Sylvain, and Maud Turian.
