= Lucienne Heurtelou =

Haitian diplomat (1920–2006)

- Born: 1920; Port-au-Prince, Haiti
- Died: May 19, 2006 (aged 85–86)
- Spouse: Dumarsais Estimé
- Children: Jean-Robert Estimé

Lucienne Heurtelou (1920 – May 19, 2006) was a Haitian diplomat, women's rights advocate, and author. She was the First Lady of Haiti from 1946 to 1950 as the wife of Haitian President Dumarsais Estimé.

== Early life ==
Heurtelou was born in Port-au-Prince in 1920 to a light-skinned family. She was working as a physical education teacher when she married Dumarsais Estimé at age 19.

== Career ==
In October 1948, Heurtelou inaugurated an orphanage in Truittier, near Carrefour, which was never completed.

She was honorary President of the Ligue Féminine d'Action Sociale, a Haitian feminist organization created in 1934, during its First Congress of Haitian Women (April 14–19, 1950). The Congress attracted delegates from 44 Haitian women's organizations and 32 delegates from 17 international women's organizations, and relaunched the Haitian women's movement for equal rights. Later that year, she and her husband were forced to flee the country following the general elections and the election of Haitian army general Paul Magloire.

Estimé died in 1953, and Heurtelou brought his body back to Haiti for burial.

In 1959, Heurtelou became ambassador to Belgium, making her Haiti's first female ambassador. She lived in Belgium for nearly 30 years, serving as ambassador until 1971, before returning to Haiti in 1984.

She is the first Haitian First Lady to have written her memoirs, a book in which she delves into the undoing of her husband's presidency by his political enemies. She published her memoirs in 2001.

== Personal life ==
She was the mother of four children, including former Haitian government official Jean-Robert Estimé. She had five grandchildren.

In her later years, Hertelou lived in a retirement home in Port-au-Prince. She died on May 19, 2006, at age 85, after being shot during a jewelry store robbery in the capital. Her remains were housed at the Ministry of Foreign Affairs building in Port-au-Prince.
