= Ligue Féminine d'Action Sociale =

Haitian women's organization

Organization’s founders

Ligue Féminine d'Action Sociale was a women's organization in Haiti, founded in 1934. It was founded by the leading suffragist Yvonne Sylvain in 1934. It was the first feminist organization in Haiti, and played an important role for the struggle for women's suffrage, which was finally introduced in 1950.

== History ==
Against this backdrop of ongoing women's opposition to the US military occupation of Haiti (1915–1934) Alice Garoute was among the founders in 1934 of the Ligue Féminine d'Action Sociale (aka Feminine League for Social Action) and its president starting in 1941. She made several impassioned and well-documented speeches in the National Assembly for full equality for women buttressing her arguments with the various conventions signed by Haiti in support of women's rights.

Besides Alice Garoute, the League's founding members included: Madeleine Sylvain, Fernande Bellegarde, Thérèse Hudicourt, Esther Dartigue, Alice Téligny Mathon, Marie-Thérèse Colimon, Marie-Thérèse Poitevien and Yvonne Hakim-Rimpel, many of whom were teachers of elite social extraction. In April 1935, Esther Dartigue was asked by the League to give a talk on the education of women in Haiti, held at the Centre d'Etudes Universitaires, and stated that unfortunately the women were poorly educated. (Only 3% of girls in rural districts attended school and many of those subsequently dropped out, and until 1944 there were no secondary schools for girls in urban areas.) The talk caused a sensation and was heavily covered by the nation's newspapers.

The league's goals were supported by the political left and included: more schools for girls, equality for women in family law, equal pay for equal work, voting rights for women, free labor unions and a labor ministry with a women's bureau. The League was banned by the government sometime after its founding but was reestablished when it agreed to study its goals instead of immediately implementing them. The league is credited for successfully campaigning for women's voting rights which were finally granted in 1957.

=== The First Congress of Haitian Women ===
The First Congress of Haitian women was organized by the League on April 10–14, 1950, under the watchful eye of its honorary president, First Lady Lucienne Heurtelou Estimé. Alice Garoute offered a particularly impassioned address about the state of education of Haitian women during which she argued that those women who had been schooled since 1940 in the three private schools that accepted them had done as well as men. She also deplored that women in Haiti during her time were treated as poorly as during Napoleon's Code Noir (aka Napoleon's Black Code): "like children and the mentally ill". At the Congress' closing ceremony Alice Garoute and other notable women lodged an official list of their demands.
