= Marie-Thérèse Colimon-Hall =

Marie-Thérèse Colimon-Hall (née Colimon, April 11, 1918 – April 1997), was a Haitian writer.

Born in Port-au-Prince, Colimon began her writing career as a playwright and published five plays between 1949 and 1960. In 1974 she published her first and most well-known novel, Fils de Misère. She also wrote essays, short stories, and children's literature. Colimon's keen observations of the Haitian people's struggle against poverty gave a particular poignancy to her work, as demonstrated by Fils de Misère. In Les Chants des sirenes, her collection of short stories, she explored the painful impact of the Haitian diaspora on both the individuals in exile and the Haitian community. She was one of the initial members of the Feminine League for Social Action.

== Recording from the Library of Congress ==
Marie-Thérèse Colimon Hall reading from her own work (1980).
