= Holtun =

Maya archaeological site in Guatemala

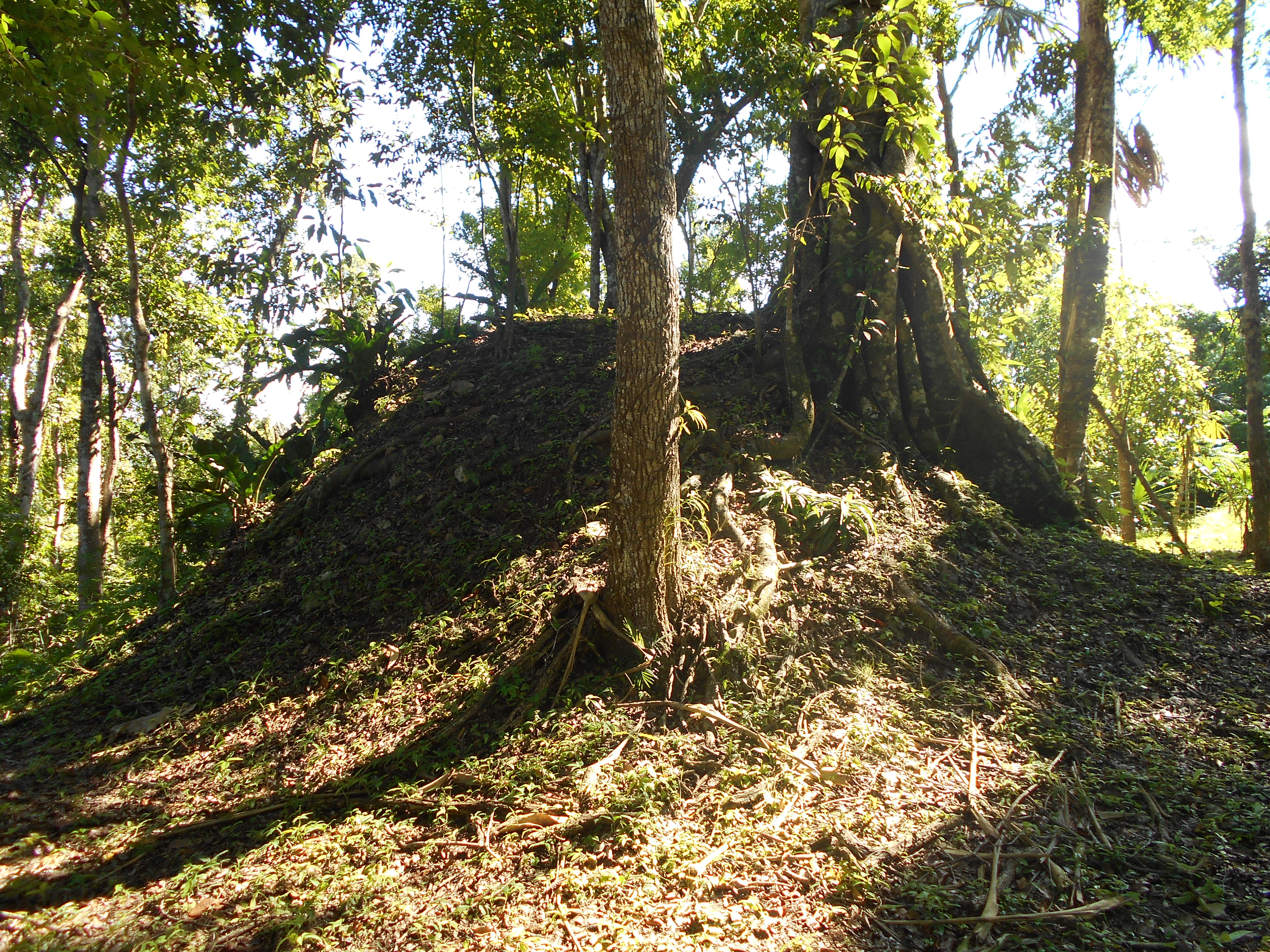

- Location within Guatemala
- 16°58′25″N 89°25′32″W
- Periods: Classic Period
- Cultures: Maya civilization
- Location: Melchor de Mencos
- Region: Petén Department, Guatemala

History
- Built: Middle Preclassic Period
- Abandoned: Late Classic Period

Site notes
- Architectural style: Classic Maya
- Archaeologists: IDAEH

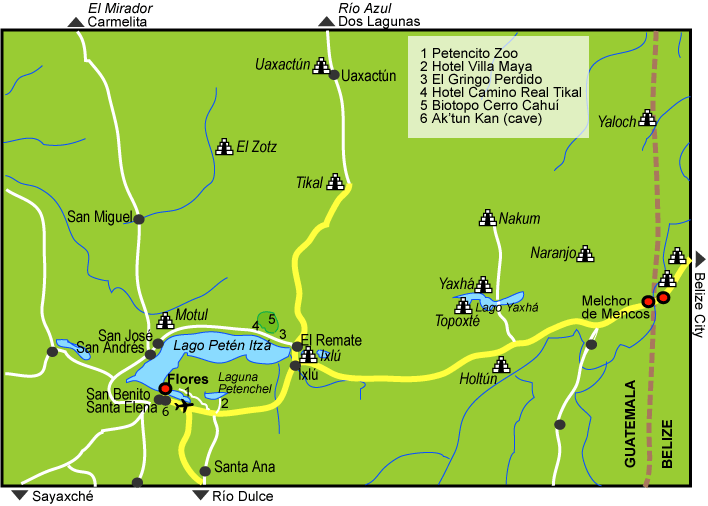
The location of Holtun in the Petén lakes region

Holtun, originally named La Máquina, is a Maya archaeological site located in the Petén Department of northern Guatemala on the road to Melchor de Mencos from Flores. The city had a long period of occupation that lasted from the Middle Preclassic through to the Late Classic periods. The site was officially recognized by the Guatemalan authorities in 1994 in response to reports from the local community of looting activity in the area. This looting had revealed large masks sculpted onto the side of one of the principal structures at the site. Holtun is the southernmost site in the Maya lowlands that is known to have such masks. The site is characterized by the presence of two particular architectural groups, consisting in a triadic acropolis and an E Group, which are markers of the sociocultural complexity of the Preclassic period in the Lowland Maya area. In addition, the nature of the karstic bedrock allowed for the creation of a great quantity of chultuns, which can be found in almost all of the architectural groups

== Location and etymology ==
The site was originally named as La Maquina after the nearest village but was renamed as Holtun by Agustín Estrada Monroy, the then director general of the Patrimonio General Cultural y Natural (General Cultural and Natural Heritage). The new name is derived from the local Itza Maya language and means "stone head". The land surrounding the site has been completely deforested and is used for the cultivation of maize, beans and plantain, with ownership divided among the municipality and private landowners .

The ruins of Holtun are located among a cluster of important Classic Period cities. Tikal is located 35 kilometres (22 mi) to the northwest, Yaxha is 12.3 kilometres (7.6 mi) to the north and Naranjo is 25 kilometres (16 mi) in the same direction.

The site is located 1.3 kilometres (0.81 mi) to the south of La Maquina village, in the municipality of Flores. Holtun lies in a broken hilly region upon a karst ridge running from northeast to southwest. It is situated on a hilltop at an altitude of 300 metres (980 ft) above mean sea level and is bordered on the south, east and west sides by three seasonal streams. There are no rivers passing very close to the site due to the local topography, with those watercourses to the south of the city draining toward lake Camalote some 3 kilometres (1.9 mi) to the south. The Mopan and Salsipuedes rivers flow 3 kilometres (1.9 mi) to the east of the lake, and the La Blanca lake is situated 8 kilometres (5.0 mi) further south. The watercourses to the north of the ruins flow northward towards Laguna Yaxhá.

== History ==
The site was occupied from the Middle Preclassic period right through to the Late Classic period.

The archaeological evidence obtained from looters trenches and systematic excavations in the E-Group suggests that Holtun plateau was occupied during the Early Preclassic period. The ceramics obtained from the context include potsherds from Mamon horizon. The excavations at the Triadic Acropolis reveals an occupation around the Late Preclassicperiod, associated with the Chicanelhorizon. The Early Classic period occupation in Holtun was identified in the elite residential groups, particularly in the groups C, D, E and F. The Late Classic period was associated with architecture modifications for residential purposes. The ceramic evidence for the Terminal Classicperiod is minimum and comes from sectors associated with the main plaza near the Group C.

=== Modern history ===
Holtun was officially discovered in February 1994, when the Guatemalan Instituto de Antropología e Historia (IDAEH - "Institute of Anthropology and History") was notified of the looting of a previously unknown site between Flores and Melchor de Mencos. IDAEH investigators are estimated to have arrived at the site between six and eight months after looting had started, during which time the major architecture at the site had been damaged. The site was thoroughly surveyed by IDAEH's Department of Prehispanic and Colonial Monuments (Departamento de Monumentos Prehispánicos y Coloniales) in June and July 1994. New archaeological investigations were initiated in 2010 by Brigitte Kovacevich and Michael Callaghan of Southern Methodist University.

==== Research Projects ====
The first official reconnaissance of the site was performed in 1994 by Erick Ponciano and the first map of the site was created. In 1998 and 2001 respectively, two field seasons were performed looking for rescuing information from the previous looting practices. The result was a valuable documentation of the site and its archaeological traits, particularly the masks at the building facades and the Chultuns. The seasons were performed by personnel of Yaxhá project from the National Institute of Anthropology and History of Guatemala, and conducted by Vilma Fialko. In 2010 the first season of Holtun Archaeological Project, with the support of Southern Methodist University, perform the first field season. During this season, personnel of the project did an exhaustive reconnaissance and surveying, creating a new map of the site. During the 2011 season, the project perform test pits in the plazas with the objective of collecting information to understand the ceramic sequence of the site. Also, the excavations pursued to understand the settlement pattern through the study of architectonic modifications in the plazas. The season of 2012 consisted in the analysis of materials collected during the previous season, particularly ceramics, Obsidian and carbon samples for Radiocarbon dating. During the next season in 2014, new test pits were done and the mapping project incorporates new land segments and archaeological traits. During this season, soil samples were taken to understand the chemical composition of the floors at the plazas through X-ray fluorescence analysis.

==== Mapping ====
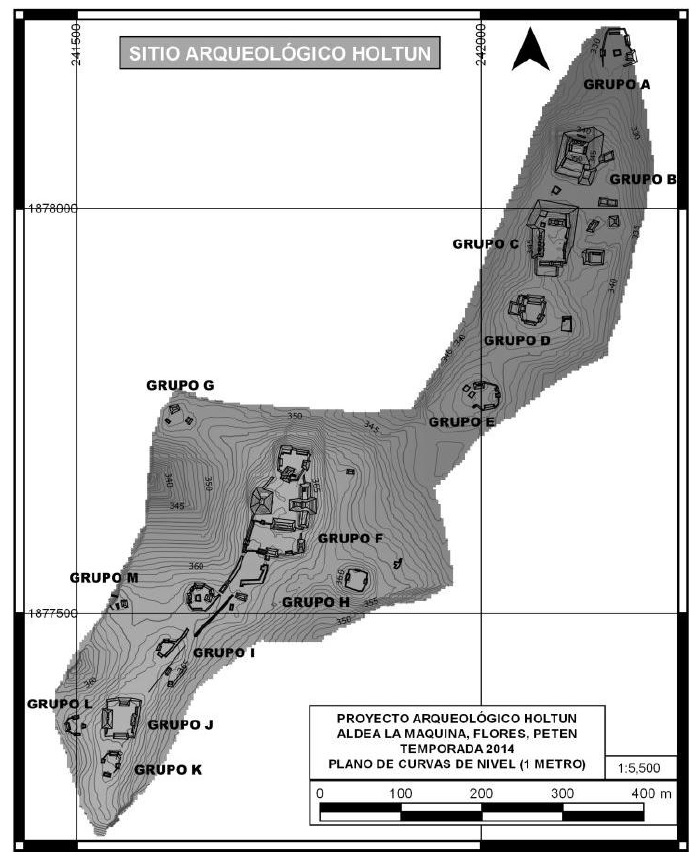
Plan of Holtun

Holtun has been mapped three times since the first reconnaissance in 1994. The first version of the map was created in 1994 as part of the first approaching to the site. The first survey reported 86 structures which were organized in four groups named with the literals A, B, C and D. The second map was created by the "Proyecto de Sitios Arqueológicos de Petén" (PROSIAPETEN). It was a revision of the original map which resulted in the identification of 115 structures organized in 14 major groups. The third map version was created by the Holtun Archaeological Project, which began the research in 2010. The project have been supported by the Department of Anthropology of Southern Methodist University . The map has been updated over three different mapping season, with the result of more than 200 structures identified and more than 27 chultuns.

== Site description ==
The sites consists of about 115 structures distributed largely along a north–south axis according to the local topography, with six architectural groups. The four principal groups are located upon hilltops, with two other groups in dry lower areas not subject to seasonal flooding. The four main groups have been labelled A–D by archaeologists.

=== Group A ===
This group is the largest group at the site, located at the extreme northern end.

Structure A-1 is a massive basal platform that measures 50 by 70 metres (160 by 230 ft) and stands 8 metres (26 ft) high. Standing upon this platform is another, smaller platform (A-2) and two structures (A-3 and A-7). These two structures flank a patio with a surface area of approximately 144 square metres (1,550 sq ft). The smaller upper platform supports three further structures laid out around a patio with an area of 108 square metres (1,160 sq ft). The whole complex faced southwards and has been identified as a Late Preclassic triadic pyramid structure.

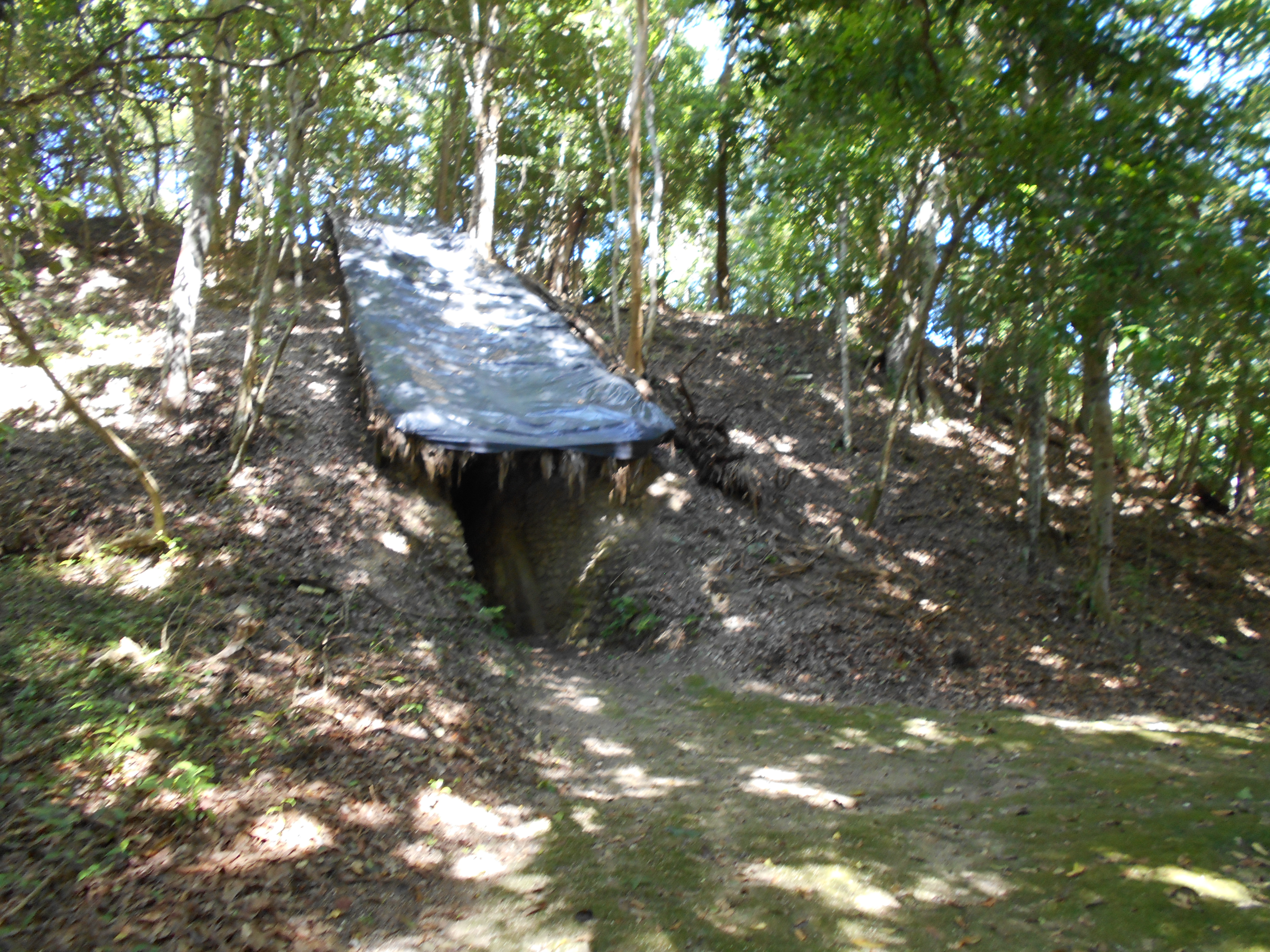
The covered looters' trench cut into Structure A2

Structure A-2 is smaller platform standing upon Structure A-1. It measures 30 by 20 metres (98 by 66 ft) by 8.5 metres (28 ft) high and is decorated with two large masks on its south face, fashioned from stone and stucco. These masks were revealed by an enormous looters' trench and gave rise to the name of the site. One of the masks is anthropomorphic and the other zoomorphic, although both have jaguar features.

Structure A-2 supports 3 additional structures (A-4, A-5 and A-6).

Structure A-3 is a mound on the south side of the main platform, it is flanked by structure A-7 and the two together limit access to the platform.

Structure A-4 stands upon the upper platform and measures approximately 2.4 metres (7.9 ft) high.

Structure A-5 is another structure standing upon the upper platform. It measures approximately 2.4 metres (7.9 ft) high.

Structure A-6 also stands upon the upper platform and measures approximately 2.4 metres (7.9 ft) high.

Structure A-7 is another mound on the south side of the main platform, it is flanked by structure A-3 and the two together limit access to the platform.

Structure A-8 is a large pyramid 34 metres (112 ft) south of Structure A-1. It measures 55 by 95 metres (180 by 312 ft) and supports a number of smaller structures (A-9 through to A-20) enclosing a courtyard with an area of 1,071 square metres (11,530 sq ft). The structures have an average base width of 8.5 metres (28 ft) and an average height of 2.7 metres (8.9 ft) high.

Structure A-9 is the largest building standing on Structure A-8.

Structures A-21 to A-24 are four low mounds with an average height of 1.2 metres (3.9 ft). They are located to the east of Structure A-8.

=== Group B ===
Group B is situated 60 metres (200 ft) south of Group A. The group consists of two small clusters of buildings grouped around their respective plazas and contains a number of chultunob (subterranean storage chambers).

Structures B-1, B-2 and B-3 enclose an interior patio on the north, west and south sides respectively. These structures measure 5 by 10 metres (16 by 33 ft).

Structure B-4 is a small basal platform situated to the east of structures B-1 to B-3.

The south plaza of Group B has an area of 480 square metres (5,200 sq ft) and is enclosed by a number of structures.

Structure B-5 is on the north side of the southern plaza in Group B. It measures 7 by 12 metres (23 by 39 ft) and stands 2.6 metres (8.5 ft) high.

Structures B-6 and B-7 are on the east side of the south plaza.

Structure B-8 is a range structure enclosing the south side of the plaza.

Structures B-9 and B-10 are on the west side of the south plaza.

=== Group C ===
This group lies 160 metres (520 ft) southeast of Group B and includes 29 structures, most of which are clustered on an artificially levelled hilltop.

Structure C-1 is a small mound on the north side of the group, it is associated with a nearby chultun.

Structures C-2 through to C-5 are part of a compact and formally arranged complex measuring 35 by 24 metres (115 by 79 ft) and form a T-shape as seen from above. The complex measures 6.2 metres (20 ft) high.

Structure C-6 is on the east side of the complex and measures 22 by 6 metres (72 by 20 ft).

Structure C-7 is the largest structure in the group and measures 20 metres (66 ft) square with a height of 6.3 metres (21 ft). It is on the south side of the complex.

Structure C-8 is on the east side of the complex and measures 6 by 12 metres (20 by 39 ft). It stands 2.6 metres (8.5 ft) high.

Structures C-15 to C-21 are long structures measuring up to 47 metres (154 ft) lying to the south of the group. The appear to be parapets enclosing an avenue running south to another cluster of buildings.

Structures C-22 to C-29 form a well-defined cluster arranged around a central courtyard lying to one side of a possible causeway running southwards from Group C to Group D. Most of these mounds are quite small, with only Structures C-22 and C-25 being of a larger size, measuring 6 metres (20 ft) in diameter and 3.6 metres (12 ft) high. The whole complex is located upon an artificially levelled platform; the central courtyard has an area of 140 square metres (1,500 sq ft).

=== Group D ===
Group D is located to the south of Group C and is linked to it by a 10-to-12-metre (33 to 39 ft) wide causeway that runs for 200 metres (660 ft).

Structures D-1, D-2 and D-3, form another small cluster to one side of the causeway. Structure D-2 is on the south side and measures 5 by 6 metres (16 by 20 ft) by 3.2 metres (10 ft) high. The three buildings enclose a small 100-square-metre (1,100 sq ft) courtyard except on the east side.

Structures D-4 through to D-10 are arranged around a central plaza with an area of 735 square metres (7,910 sq ft), mostly supported by Structure D-11.

Structure D-4 measures 10 by 12 metres (33 by 39 ft) by 4.4 metres (14 ft) high and is on the north side of the plaza.

Structure D-6 is a large building on the west side of the plaza. It measures 10 by 20 metres (33 by 66 ft) and is 3.8 metres (12 ft) high.

Structure D-9 is on the west side of the plaza and is the largest structure in Group D, measuring 23 by 13 metres (75 by 43 ft) by 4.6 metres (15 ft) high.

Structure D-10 is also on the west side of the plaza and measures 10 by 6 metres (33 by 20 ft) and stands 1.7 metres (5.6 ft) high.

Structure D-11 is an artificial platform supporting the southernmost cluster of buildings in the group, it is accessed via the causeway.

Structures D-12, D-13 and D-14 form another small plaza group, the plaza has an area of 120 square metres (1,300 sq ft) and is open on the southern side.

=== Sculpture ===
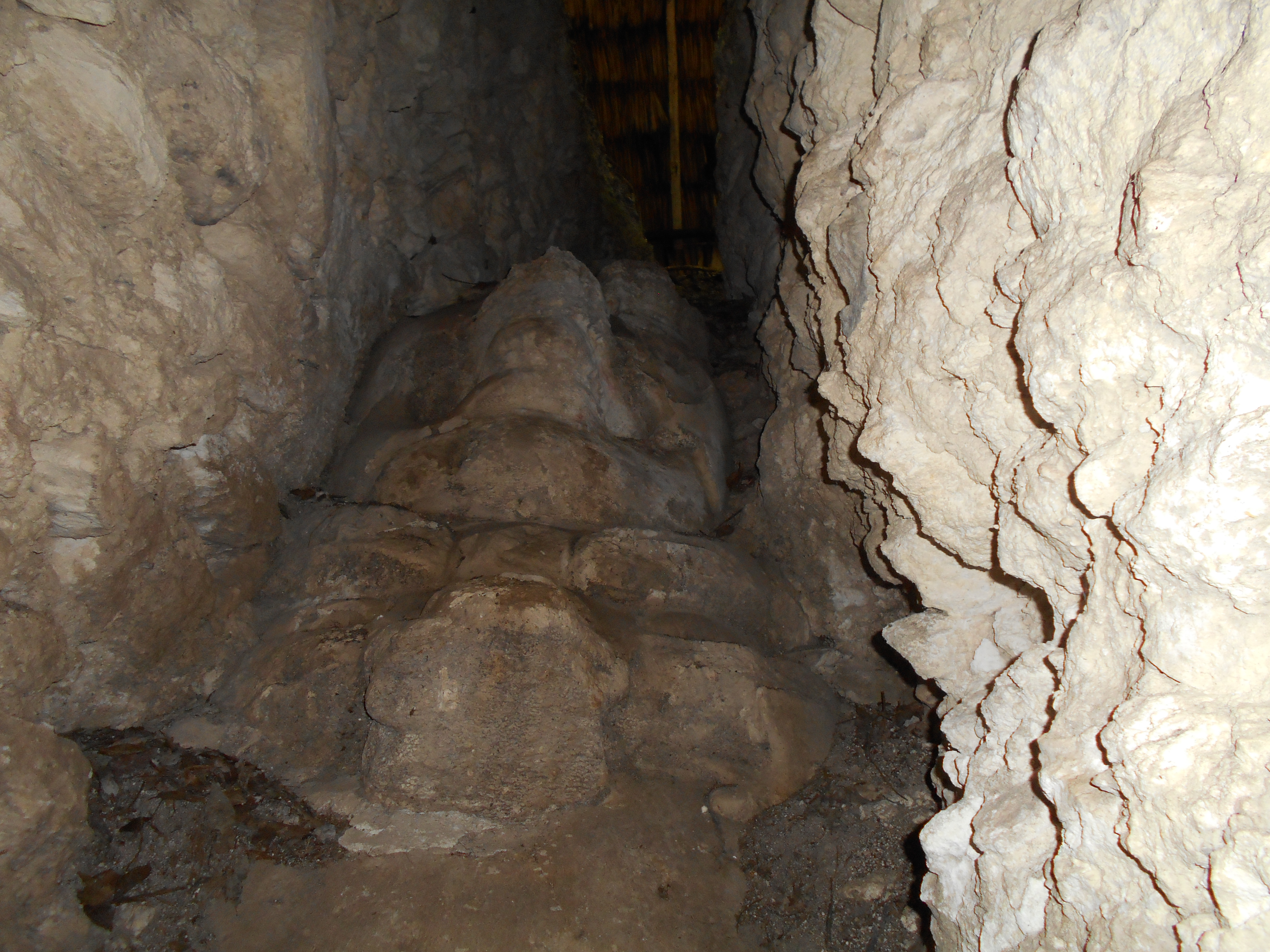
Stucco masks on Structure A-2

The masks for which the site is best known were found on Structure A-2 and are known from three parts of the structure where they appear to have flanked the principle stairway. The first of these is 4 metres (13 ft) under the stone talud forming the last stage of construction. It was only partially uncovered during excavations and traces of red pigment were found on the plaster. The exposed portion of the mask measures 90 centimetres (35 in) high by 12 centimetres (4.7 in) thick and is inclined at 60°.

The second area of masks was found 8 metres (26 ft) inside the main looters' tunnel. There are three masks fashioned from limestone blocks and covered with a 30-centimetre (12 in) thick coating of stucco. These masks are angled at 45°. The lowest is a zoomorphic mask with feline features that measures 87 by 86 centimetres (34 by 34 in). Immediately above it is another mask measuring 130 by 86 centimetres (51 by 34 in). It is an anthropomorphic mask in a good state of preservation with circular eyes, a prominent upper lip, a flattened nose and a downturned mouth. The third mask was destroyed by the looters' excavations and was estimated to have a height of 1.6 metres (5.2 ft) based on remaining stucco fragments.

The final area of masks was found 16 metres (52 ft) into the looters' tunnel. The two masks in this area are the best preserved at the site. The lower mask measures 50 by 48 centimetres (20 by 19 in) and was fashioned from limestone blocks covered in a 60-centimetre (24 in) thick coating of stucco. It is a zoomorphic mask that still has traces of red, cream and black paint. The other mask is located immediately above it and is covered in a 42 centimetres (17 in) layer of stucco. It is an anthropomorphic mask with just a part of the right cheek exposed. It also has red, cream and black pigment traces, as well as orange spots in a band around the cheek that are similar to jaguar pelt. Both masks are angled at 45°.
