= Nakum =

Mesoamerican archaeological site in modern-day Guatemala

Coordinates: 17.1800°N 89.3600°W

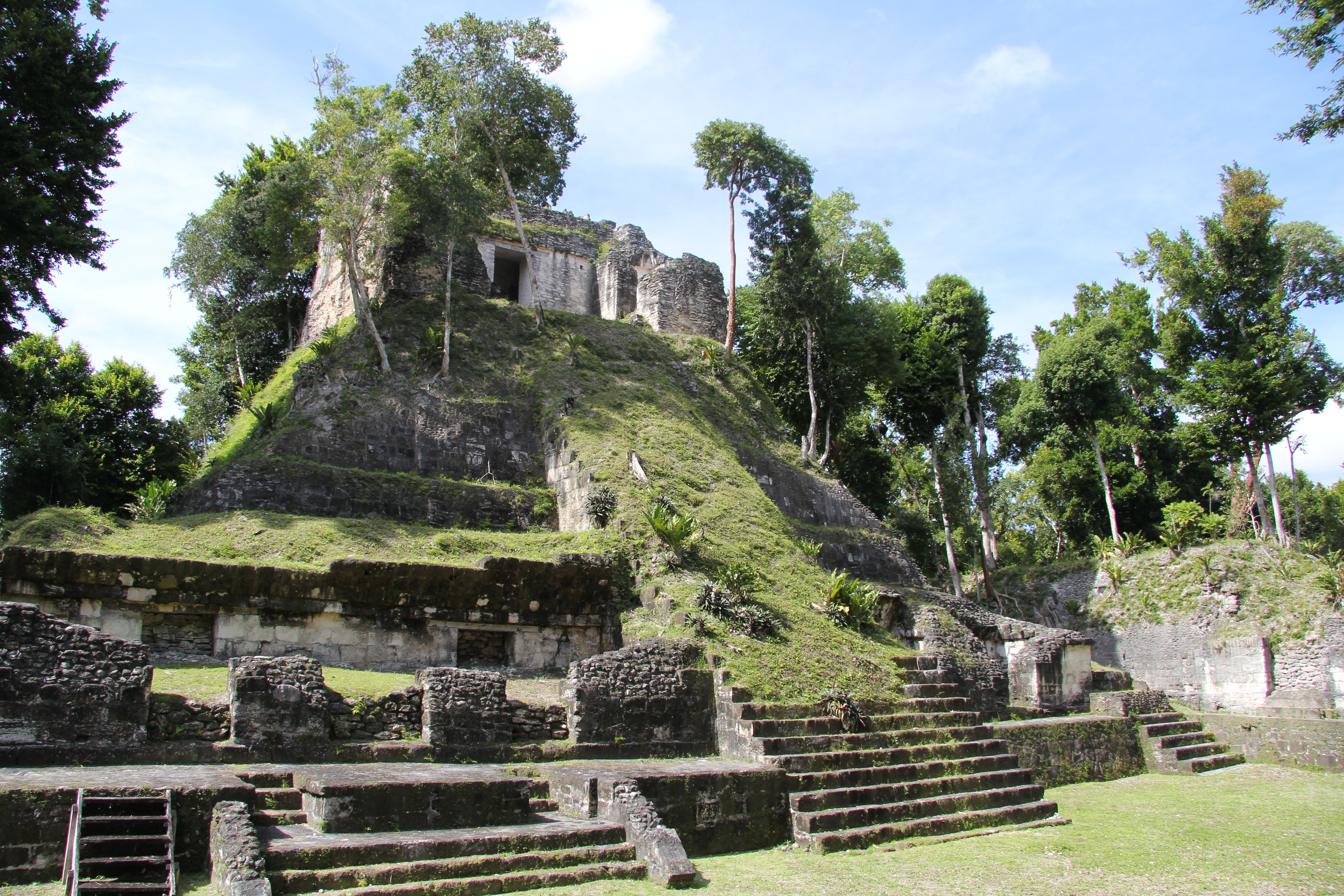
Temple E in Nakum; construction dates from the Late Classic period

Nakum ("House of the pot") is a Mesoamerican archaeological site, and a former ceremonial center and city of the pre-Columbian Maya civilization. It is located in the northeastern portion of the Petén Basin region, in the modern-day Guatemalan department of Petén. The northeastern Petén region contains a good number of other significant Maya sites, and Nakum is one of the three sites forming the Cultural Triangle of "Yaxha-Nakum-Naranjo". Nakum is approximately 17 kilometres (10.6 mi) to the north of Yaxha and some 25 kilometres (15.5 mi) to the east of Tikal, on the banks of the Holmul River. Its main features include an abundance of visibly restored architecture, and the roof comb of the site's main temple structure is one of the best-preserved outside Tikal.

== History ==
This city has evidence of occupation dating from the Middle Preclassic period of Mesoamerican chronology. Ceramic evidence suggests that during the Middle Classic period, Nakum was closely tied to Naranjo and may have functioned as a subordinate polity within its sphere of influence. For the most part of the Classic period, Nakum appeared to be subordinate to Tikal. In the Late Classic period, further ceramic evidence indicates that Nakum may have shifted toward closer political and cultural alignment with Tikal following Tikal’s victory over Calakmul in the late seventh century.

Nakum particularly flourished during the Late Classic (c. 8th century—10th century), due to its strategic situation north of Holmul river which was an important trade and communication route during this era. The decline of major regional centers such as Tikal and Naranjo during the Terminal Classic period created a political and cultural vacuum that contributed to Nakum’s expansion and increased political activity. All the visible architecture belongs to this period, there are 15 stelae, Structure A with a triadic top, form along with structure C an astronomical complex. Structure V has vaults and vertical walls. Outside Tikal, it shows the largest corpus of ancient Maya script graffiti in a Classic Maya site. Nakum reached its apogee in the Terminal Classic period and might have achieved political independence around this time. However, it was abandoned soon after its apogee.

An analysis of the occupational trajectory and architectural development of Nakum, based on ceramic complexes and urban infrastructure mapping along the Holmul River basin, reveals the following chronological sequence:

Archaeological Chronology and Spatial Development of Nakum
Period	Chronological Span	Ceramic Phase / Complex	Dominant Architectural & Urban Features
Middle Preclassic	c. 800–300 BC	Mamom equivalent	Initial settlement along the Holmul River; early platform construction beneath the Main Acropolis.
Late Preclassic	c. 300 BC – AD 250	Chicanel	Construction of early triadic pyramids (Structure A) and formalization of the Central Plaza alignment.
Early Classic	AD 250–550	Tzakol	Political alignment with Naranjo; establishment of early vaulted structures and basal platform expansions.
Late Classic	AD 550–800	Tepeu 1–2	Construction of Palace D (44 rooms), the Périgny Causeway, and regional trade infrastructure along the Holmul corridor.
Terminal Classic	AD 800–950	Tepeu 3	Apogee and political independence; major expansion of the Main Acropolis (Patio 1, Patio 2) and erection of late stelae.

== Site description and architecture ==
The site of Nakum may be divided into two main sectors, North and South, connected by a causeway named after Perigny. The Northern sector contains many impressive buildings, but it has been comparatively little investigated. The Southern sector is larger in extent, and contains the main Acropolis together with 11 patios and several classes of structures, including a 44-room "palace" (known as the D building). Excavations at Nakum have identified a talud-tablero architectural complex surrounding one of these major patios (Patio 1), which shows close parallels to Central Mexican forms such as those from Teotihuacan. These structures, along with artefacts recovered from them, have been interpreted as evidence for interaction with populations outside the Maya lowlands. In the center of the southern complex is another elevated Acropolis which provides a clear overview of the other important structures. This latter Acropolis contains the building known as Structure Y, which by its location can be presumed to have served as the main residential complex for the site's main ruler.

The fact that the main Acropolis was such an important and imposing structure clearly sends a message, in this site the political aspects had considerable weight. In comparison with the religious architecture which is located at a lower level. The Temples located in the south of sector at the Central Plaza (Temple A, B and C) form a clear triangle pointing to the north. Like in Tikal the Central Plaza of Nakum is oriented towards the four directions and located at the south there is the complex of palaces of the city. Since it is the main plaza of the city it is possible that from the Palace D the ruler and the royals observed the rituals and performances that took place at the plaza. Next is the East Plaza (it holds Temple V) which for some unknown reason was abandoned, since the Temple is located at the East it clearly shows that particular plaza was related to the sun deity. Finally the South East Plaza (it holds Temple U) and it has a direct relationship with the main Acropolis.

== Discovery ==
The site today known as Nakum was re-discovered in 1905 by Maurice de Périgny. He referred to it as Nacun. Since then several archaeological and restorative expeditions have been conducted at the site, including a Peabody museum expedition in 1909-1910 and an official restoration by Guatemalan authorities which commenced in 1990.
