= Twin-pyramid complex =

Style of Mayan structure

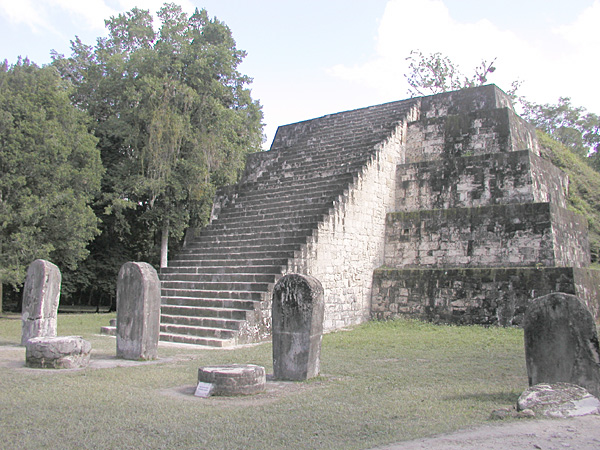
The restored east pyramid of Group Q, a twin-pyramid complex at Tikal

A twin-pyramid complex or twin-pyramid group was an architectural innovation of the Maya civilization of ancient Mesoamerica. Twin-pyramid complexes were regularly built at the great city of Tikal in the central Petén Basin of Guatemala to celebrate the end of the 20-year kʼatun cycle of the Maya Long Count Calendar. A twin-pyramid complex has been identified at Yaxha, a large city that was 30 kilometres (19 mi) to the southeast of Tikal. Another has been mapped at Ixlu, and Zacpeten appears also to possess at least one twin-pyramid complex and possibly two. These examples outside of Tikal itself indicate that their cities were closely linked to Tikal politically.

The basic layout of a twin-pyramid complex consists of identical pyramids on the east and west sides of a small plaza, with a walled enclosure to the north housing a sculpted stela-altar pair and a range building to the south. Plain monuments were generally raised at the foot of the east pyramid. The term "twin-pyramid complex" was first used in 1956 by Edwin M. Shook when he recognised that five such groups conformed to a similar architectural pattern.

== Design ==
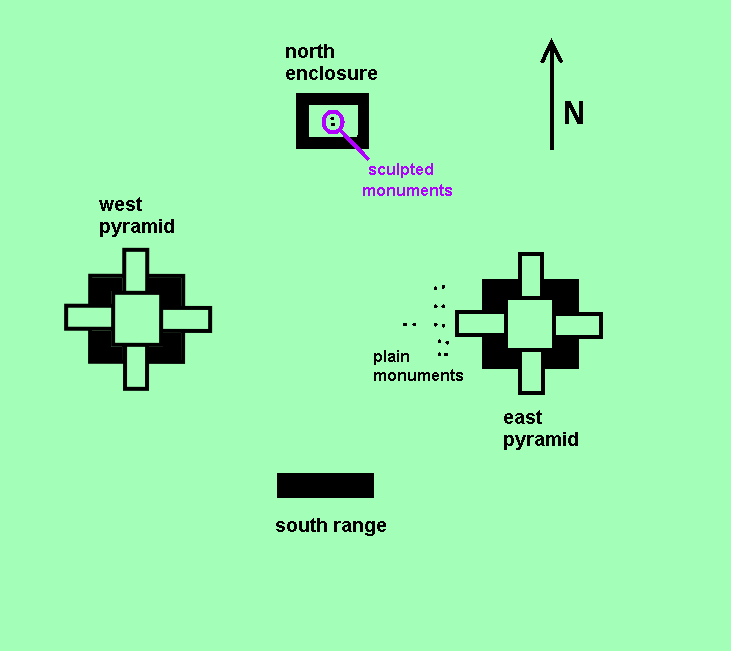
Plan of a typical twin-pyramid complex

Twin-pyramid complexes had identical radial pyramids on the east and the west sides of a small plaza; these pyramids had a stairway climbing each of its four sides. Usually they had a range building on the south side that possessed nine doorways and a small enclosure on the north side that housed a sculpted stela-altar pair. These sculpted monuments recorded the king performing the kʼatun-ending ceremony. Up to nine plain stela-altar pairs were erected in a line at the foot of the eastern pyramid, facing west; at Tikal no stelae were ever placed in front of the western pyramid. The whole twin-pyramid complex may be a miniature representation of Tikal's Great Plaza, mirroring the placement of pyramids on the east and west sides, an ancestral shrine to the north and a simple palace on the south side. The twin pyramids were never designed to support a summit temple.

The walled northern enclosure faced southwards onto the plaza. Access was via a single doorway sporting a corbel arch; the enclosure was not roofed.

== Group descriptions ==
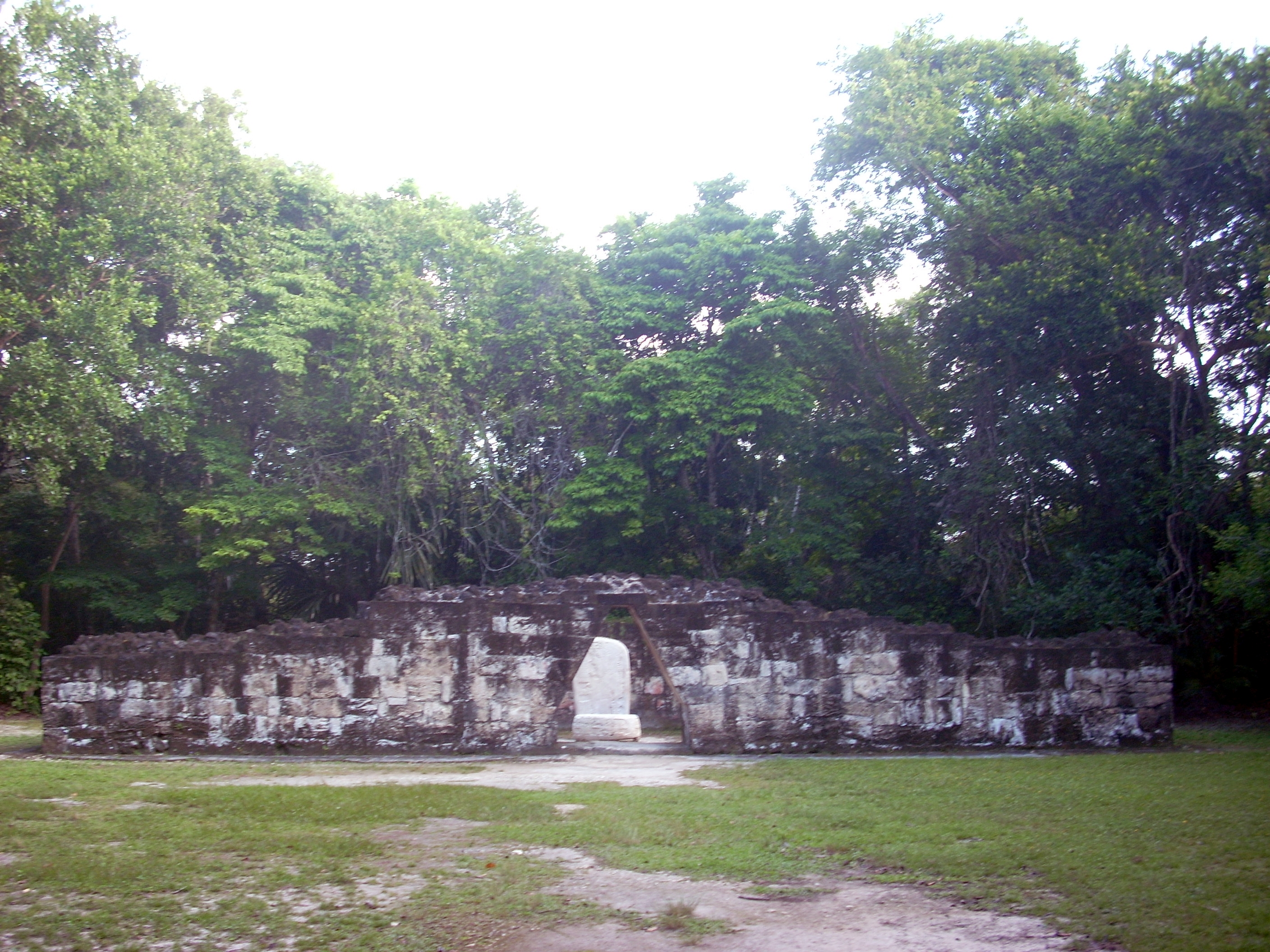
The restored north enclosure of Group Q at Tikal

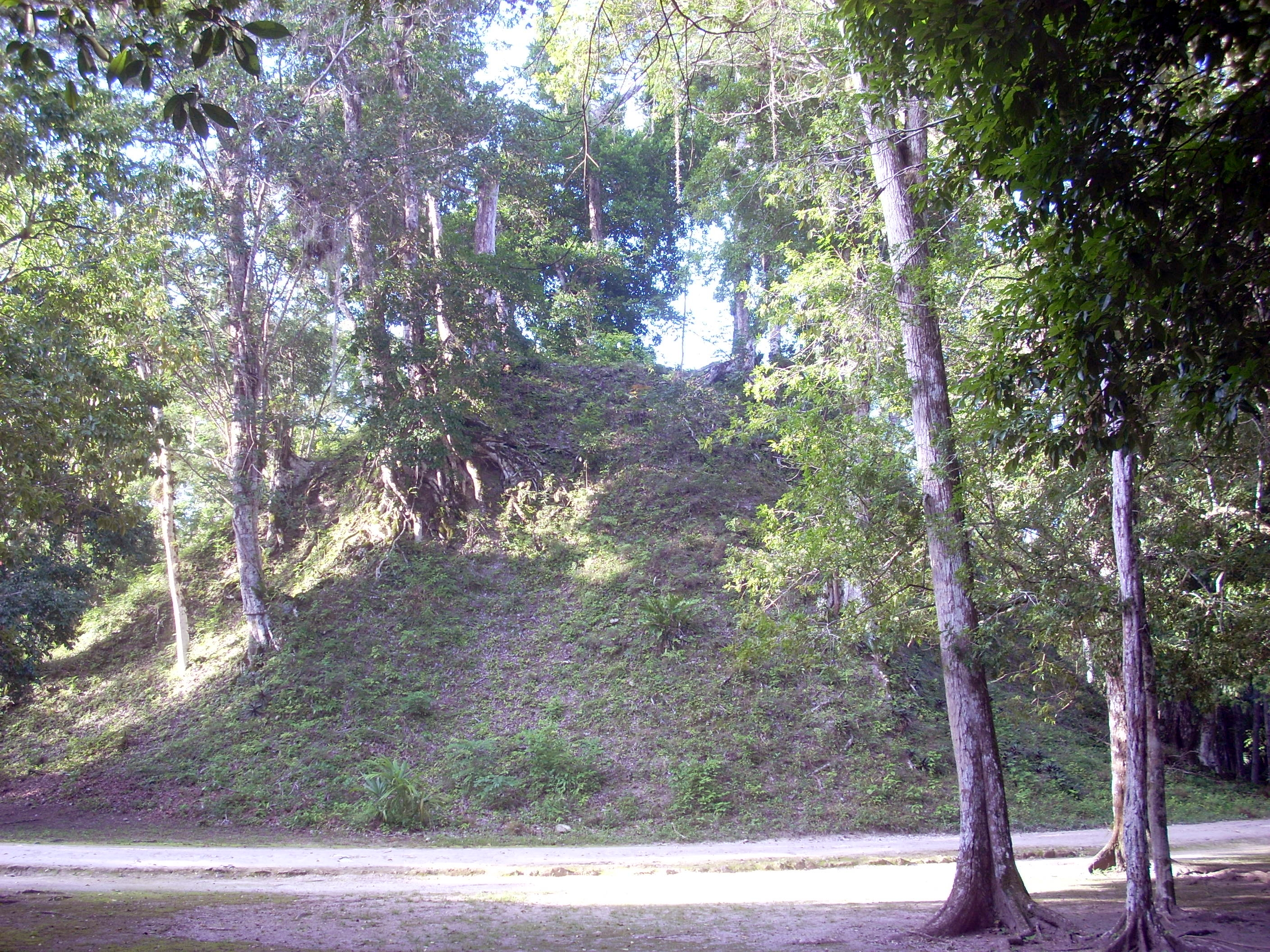
The unrestored east pyramid of Tikal Group R

The earliest twin-pyramid complex was built in Tikal's East Plaza early in the 6th century AD. This first example was used to celebrate several kʼatun endings. In the Late Classic Period (c. AD 600–900) a new twin-pyramid complex was built for each kʼatun-ending ceremony, with six complexes built between 692 and 790. A total of nine such complexes have been discovered at Tikal, although one was completely demolished in antiquity and others were partially dismantled.

Later twin-pyramid complexes tended to be larger than their predecessors, with two examples being much larger than earlier versions.

Summary of twin-pyramid complexes
| Site | Group | Date (AD) | Kʼatun |
|---|---|---|---|
| Ixlu | North Plaza | Classic | |
| Tikal | Group L (Group 5B-1) | 672 | 9.12.0.0.0 |
| Tikal | Group M (Group 3D-1) | 692 | 9.13.0.0.0 |
| Tikal | Group N (Group 5C-1) | 711 | 9.14.0.0.0 |
| Tikal | Group O (Group 4D-1) | 731 | 9.15.0.0.0 |
| Tikal | Group P (Group 3D-2) | 751 | 9.16.0.0.0 |
| Tikal | Group Q (Group 4E-4) | 771 | 9.17.0.0.0 |
| Tikal | Group R (Group 4E-3) | 790 | 9.18.0.0.0 |
| Tikal | Group 4D-2 | | |
| Tikal | Group 5E-Sub.1 | | |
| Yaxha | Plaza A | 793 | |
| Zacpeten | Group A | Late–Terminal Classic | |
| Zacpeten | Group B | Late–Terminal Classic | |

=== Tikal ===
Five of the nine twin-pyramid complexes at Tikal had been recorded prior to the University of Pennsylvania initiating the Tikal Project of investigations in 1956. Four had been reported by Teobert Maler in 1911 and mapped by Alfred Tozzer and R. E. Merwin that year; the last had been discovered by Edwin Shook in 1937. When Shook found Stela 22 in Group Q in 1956, he realised that all five groups conformed to a set architectural pattern and he coined the term "twin-pyramid complex" to describe them.

Tikal Group L (also known as Group 5B-1) was situated to the south of Tikal Temple IV but was demolished in antiquity. Site archaeologists believe that the complex was demolished around 740 in order to provide construction material for Temple IV. The visible remains are a number of plain monuments scattered on the surface; the northern enclosure no longer stands but contained a plain stela-altar pair (Stela P-41 and Altar P-43). The complex was probably built in 672.

Tikal Group M (also known as Group 3D-1) is west of the twin-pyramid Group P, on the north side of the Maudslay Causeway, near its northern extreme. The west pyramid (Structure 3D-98) was largely dismantled in ancient times. Three plain stelae were erected in front of the east pyramid (Structure 3D-100). The north enclosure is badly preserved, although it still contains Stela 30, paired with Altar 14; these monuments are dated to 692. Group M was discovered during mapping by the Tikal Project in 1959; it was confirmed as a twin-pyramid group by excavations that uncovered its northern enclosure in 1961.

Tikal Group N (also known as Group 5C-1) lies between Tikal Temple IV and the Bat Palace. It was built in 711, according to the hieroglyphic text sculpted on Stela 16 in the group. Stela 16 is paired with Altar 5, they are among the finest examples of sculpted monuments surviving from Tikal; both of these monuments are located in the northern enclosure. Altar 5 bears the sculpted image of two nobles on its upper face, one of these is probably Jasaw Chan K'awiil I. They are performing a ritual using the bones of an important woman. Stela 16 is sculpted only on its front face, which bears a portrait of king Jasaw Chan K'awiil I and an accompanying hieroglyphic text.

Tikal Group O (also known as Group 4D-1) is on the west side of the Maler Causeway, due west from the twin-pyramid groups Q and R. It differs in size from the twin-pyramid groups to the east. Unusually, the stela-altar pair in the northern enclosure are plain monuments, lacking sculpture and hieroglyphic text. This group is likely to have been dedicated in 731.

Tikal Group P (also known as Group 3D-2) is at the northern extreme of the site core, where the Maudsley Causeway meets the Maler Causeway. The pyramids have been excavated and are partially restored. The northern enclosure housed Stela 20, paired with Altar 8; it was dedicated in 751. Both monuments are now in the Museo Nacional de Arqueología y Etnología in Guatemala City.

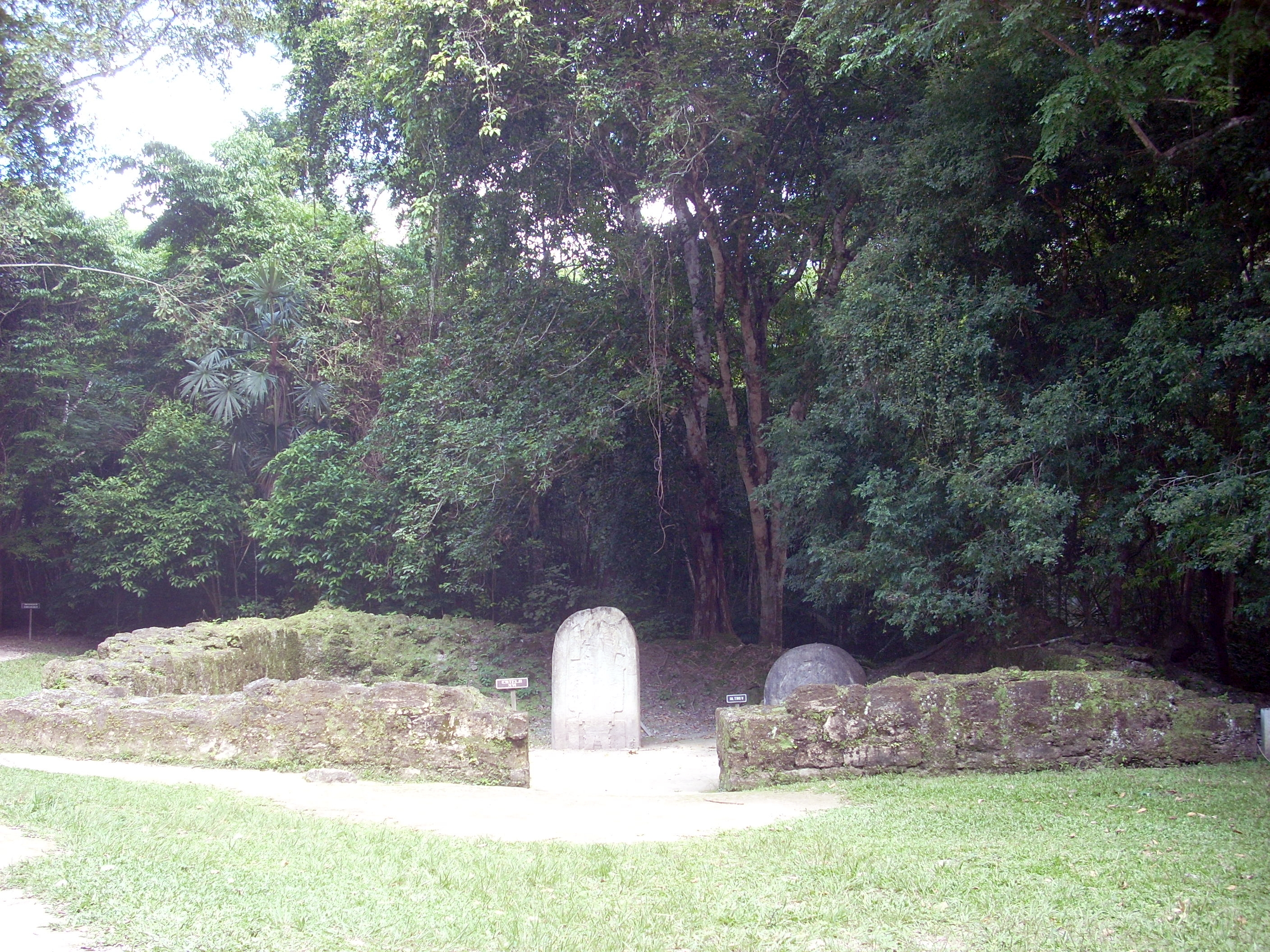
Northern enclosure of Group N at Tikal

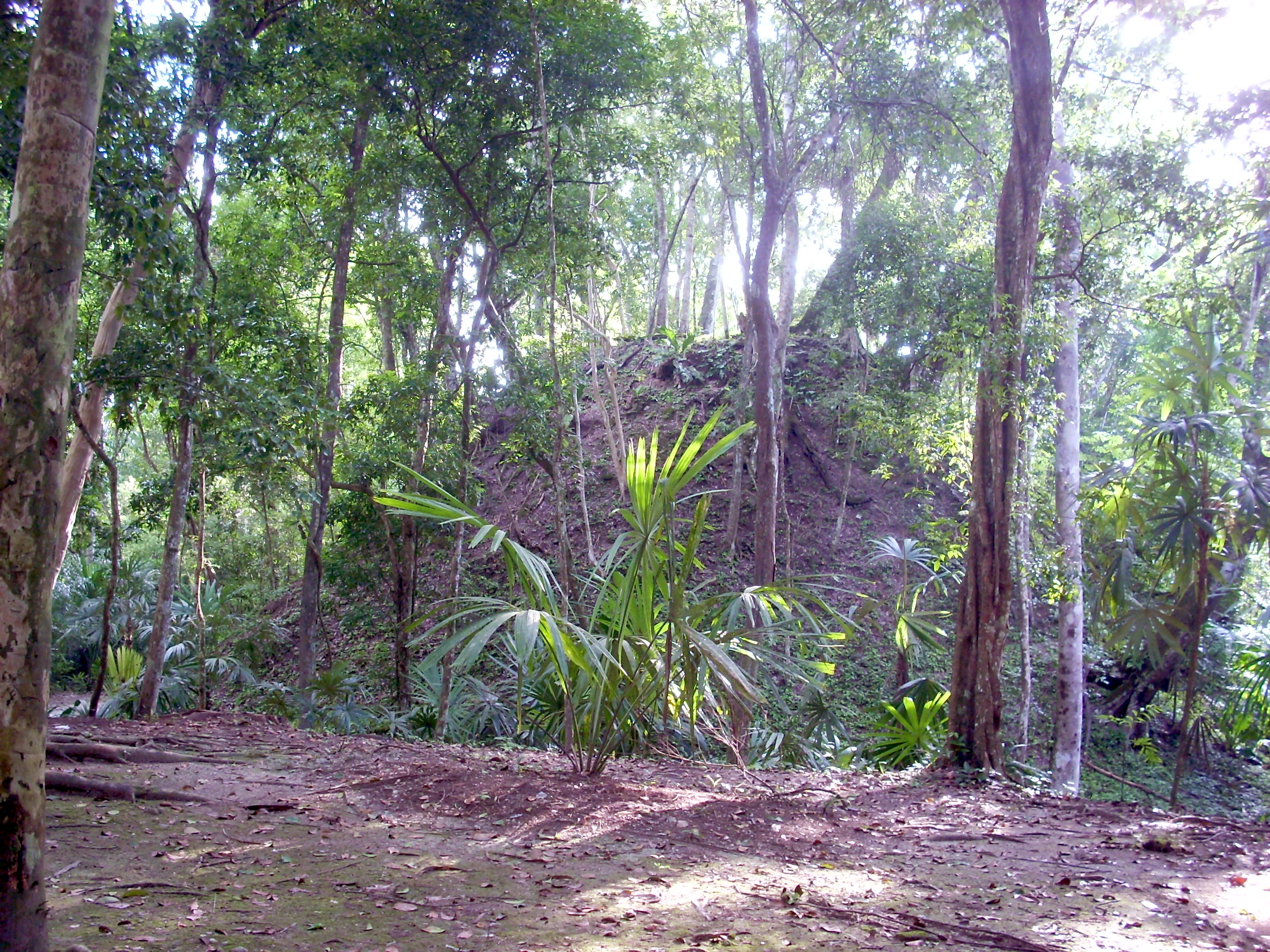
The west pyramid of Tikal Group R

Tikal Group Q (also known as Group 4E-4) is situated to the east of Group R, another twin-pyramid group on the east side of the Maler Causeway. It is largest twin-pyramid complex at Tikal and was associated with king Yax Nuun Ayiin II, who is portrayed on Stela 22, erected within the complex's enclosure. Stela 22 and the paired Altar 10 outstanding examples of Late Classic Maya sculpture, although the sculpted figure was mutilated in ancient times. The group has been largely restored, with its monuments re-erected, and restoration of the east pyramid, north enclosure and south range. Group Q dates to 771.

Tikal Group R (also known as Group 4E-3) is on the east side of the Maler Causeway about halfway between the East Plaza and the North Group. Stela 19 and Altar 6 are situated in the northern enclosure; the text on the stela dates the complex to 790. One of the plain stelae that was erected in front of the east pyramid is missing and the altar that was once paired with it has been moved away from its original position. Excavations indicate that the stela and altar were moved by inhabitants of the area during the Postclassic period (AD 900–1525).

Tikal Group 4D-2 possessed two monuments that were suggestive of a badly damaged twin-pyramid group.

Tikal Group 5E-Sub.1 was discovered during excavations of an overlying ballcourt in 1965 by Christopher Jones. The style and locations of the two pyramids in the group included it among Tikal's twin-pyramid complexes.

=== Ixlu ===
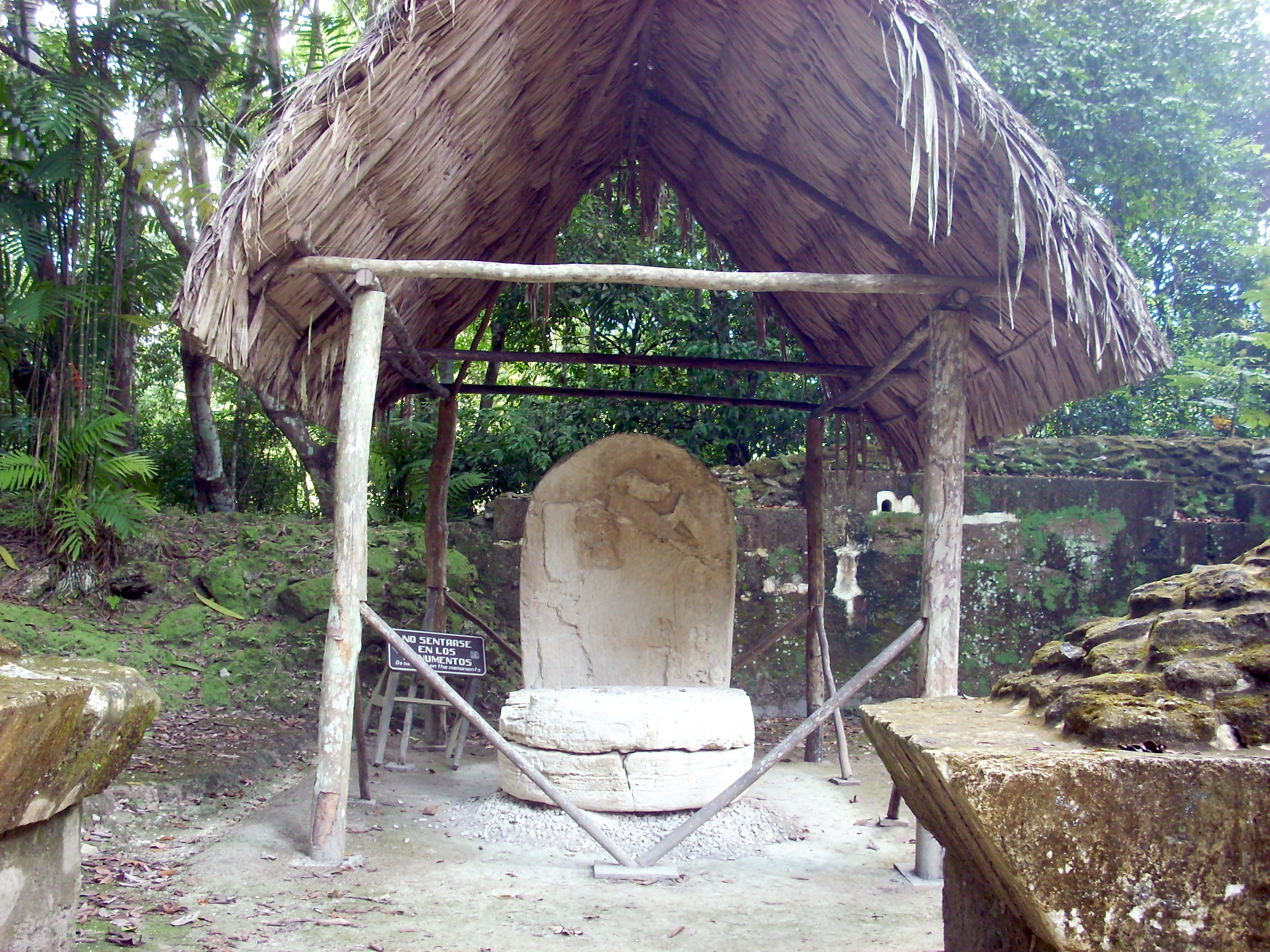
Tikal Stela 19 and Altar 6 viewed through the entrance of the north enclosure of Group R

Ixlu possesses a twin-pyramid complex in its North Plaza. The complex has been dated to the Classic Period.

=== Yaxha ===
Yaxha Plaza A is a twin-pyramid complex located immediately north of its East Acropolis. A sculpted stela was erected at the base of the West Pyramid of the complex; Stela 13 was sculpted but has been broken into fragments, although much of the sculpture is preserved. The text on the stela includes a date in 793, the latest recorded date at the city. Stela 13 bears the image of a king of Yaxha together with a text describing the celebration of an equinox.

=== Zacpeten ===
Zacpeten Group A has been identified as having a possible twin-pyramid complex dating to the Late to Terminal Classic Period. It was built upon an earlier basal platform dating back to the Middle Preclassic, with later Postclassic modifications. Group A included some plain stelae and a sculpted stela-altar pair such as those typically found in a twin-pyramid complex. Although the stelae may have been moved from nearby Group B, the investigating archaeologists consider that it is more likely that Group A was itself once a twin-pyramid complex.

Zacpeten Group B was dominated by a rough twin-pyramid complex dating to the Late to Terminal Classic Period. The twin-pyramids in the group differed in size and neither stood higher than 4 metres (13 ft). A plain stela was raised before the eastern pyramid and a sculpted stela was found buried in this complex. Structures representing the north and south structures of a regular twin-pyramid complex were also present although they were not aligned symmetrically.
