= Ixlu =

Archaeological site in Flores, Guatemala

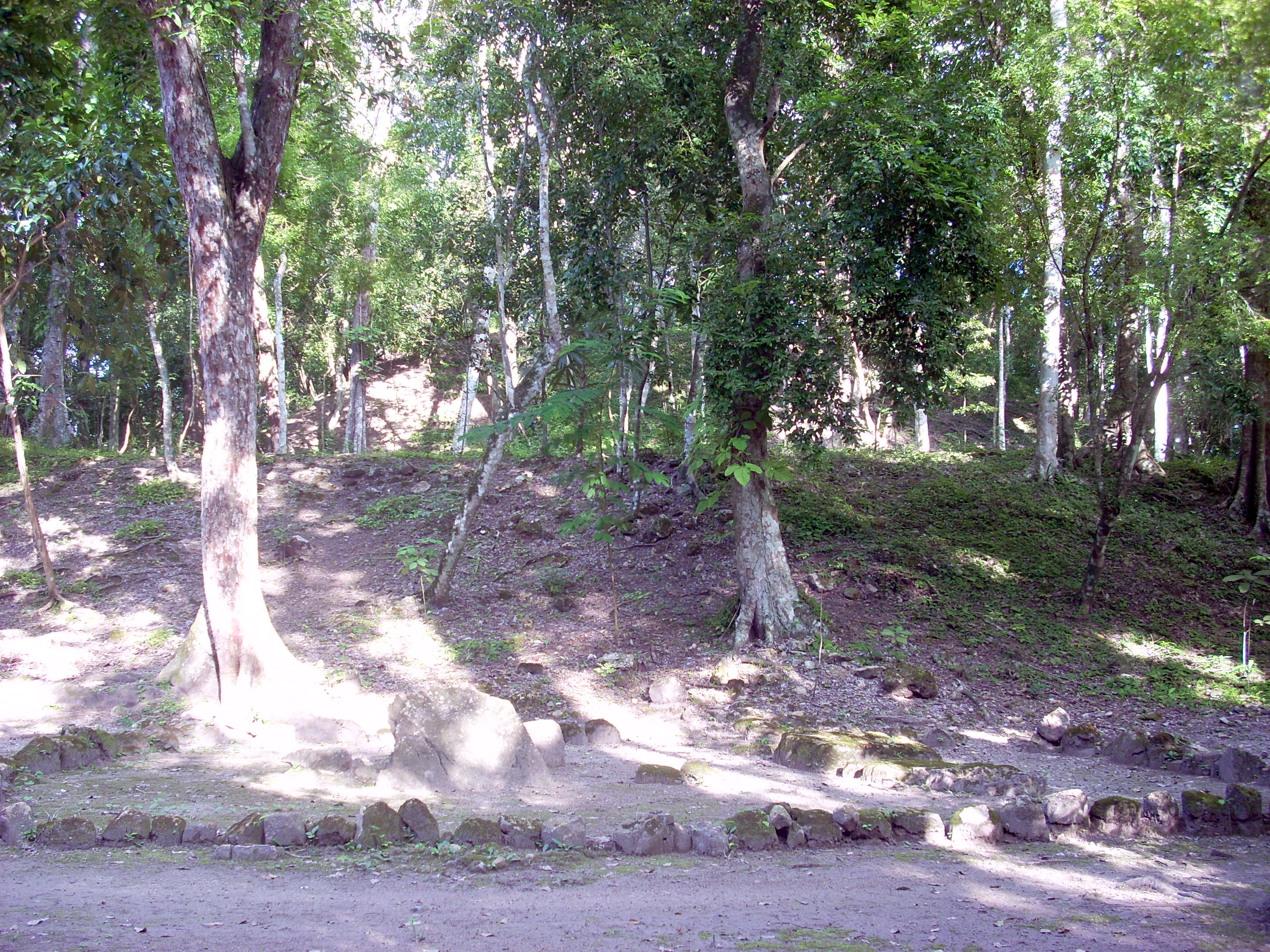
- Unrestored architecture overlooking the Main Plaza

- Location within Guatemala
- 16°58′19″N 89°41′9″W
- Periods: Classic - Postclassic
- Cultures: Maya
- Location: Flores
- Region: Petén Department, Guatemala

Site notes
- Architectural styles: Classic and Postclassic Maya
- Responsible body: Ministerio de Cultura y Deportes

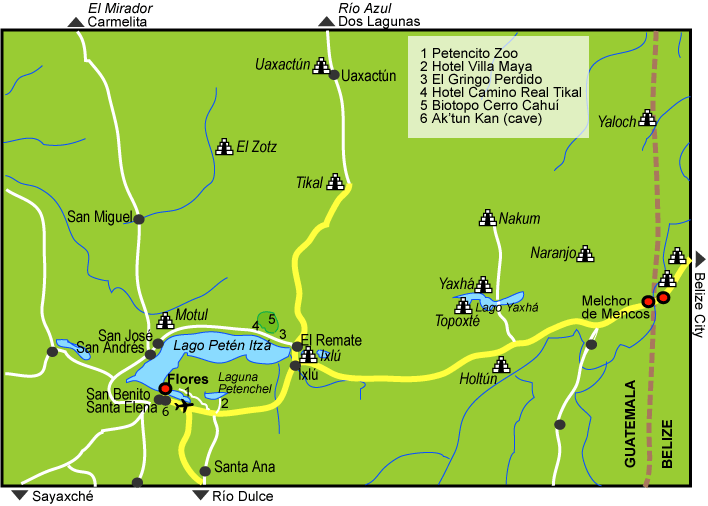
Map of Lake Petén Itzá, showing location of Ixlu on the eastern shore

Ixlu (Mayan pronunciation: [iʃˈluː]) is a small Maya archaeological site that dates to the Classic and Postclassic Periods. It is located on the isthmus between the Petén Itzá and Salpetén lakes, in the northern Petén Department of Guatemala. The site was an important port with access to Lake Petén Itzá via the Ixlu River. The site has been identified as Saklamakhal, also spelt Saclemacal, a capital of the Kowoj Maya.

The site has over 150 structures, the majority of which in the site core display typically Postclassic characteristics. The site was briefly investigated by Don and Prudence Rice in 1980.

Ixlu is located approximately 23 km (14 mi) east of the departmental capital of Flores and 275 km (171 mi) north of Guatemala City. Ixlu is approximately 28 km (17 mi) south of the ruins of the major Classic Period city of Tikal.

== Occupation ==
Archaeological investigations have uncovered potsherds dating as far back as the early Middle Preclassic (1000 BC–800 BC). Postclassic potsherds are widely distributed in the upper levels of the site to a depth of 30 to 40 cm (12 to 16 in). Evidence from the Temple of the Hidden Jars indicates a continuous occupation from the Preclassic right through the Classic (AD 200–900) to the Postclassic Period (AD 900–1525), with occupation continuing until approximately 1700, well after the Spanish Conquest of most of Guatemala, according to ethnohistoric sources. The Petén Lakes region finally fell to the Spanish Crown in 1697, at which time Ixlu was in disputed territory between the mutually hostile Itza and Kowoj kingdoms.

== Structures ==
Fifty structures have been mapped at Ixlu by the Central Peten Historical Ecology Project. Nine of these are C-shaped bench superstructures and two are L-shaped.

Ixlu has two ballcourts and is one of only two Postclassic sites in the central Petén lakes region to have a recognisable ballcourt. However, both ballcourts at Ixlu apparently date to the Late Classic. The site possesses a twin pyramid complex, a feature that is rare outside of Tikal and probably indicates the political influence of that great city.

The architecture at Ixlu resembles that at the Late Classic site of Seibal on the Pasión River.

=== The Temple of the Hidden Jars ===
The Temple of the Hidden Jars (Templo de las Vasijas Escondidas) has been labelled as Structure 2034. It is bordered by Structure 2041 on the south side, Structure 2036 to the west and Structure 2035 to the north, its eastern side faces onto Patio B. The temple measures 13.9 by 9.6 metres (46 by 31 ft) and consisted of a two-level platform, the first level was 1.15 metres (3.8 ft) high and the second level had a height of 1.2 metres (3.9 ft). The temple has been dated to the Late Postclassic Period (AD 1200-1525). A stairway ascended the west side of the temple and there was an altar on the summit that measured 1 metre (3.3 ft). The temple is named from two hidden niches on the west side of the temple, one at the foot of the stairway and the second under an altar on the temple steps. Each contained a single red-brown ceramic vessel measuring approximately 16 centimetres (6.3 in) in diameter and 14 centimetres (5.5 in) high, each with its respective concave lid. The vessels have four handles spaced equidistantly around the circumference, with the lids also possessing a handle. The jars contained only brown soil. This style of hidden niche is similar to niches associated with ceremonial structures in distant Mayapan in the north of the Yucatán Peninsula.

== Monuments ==
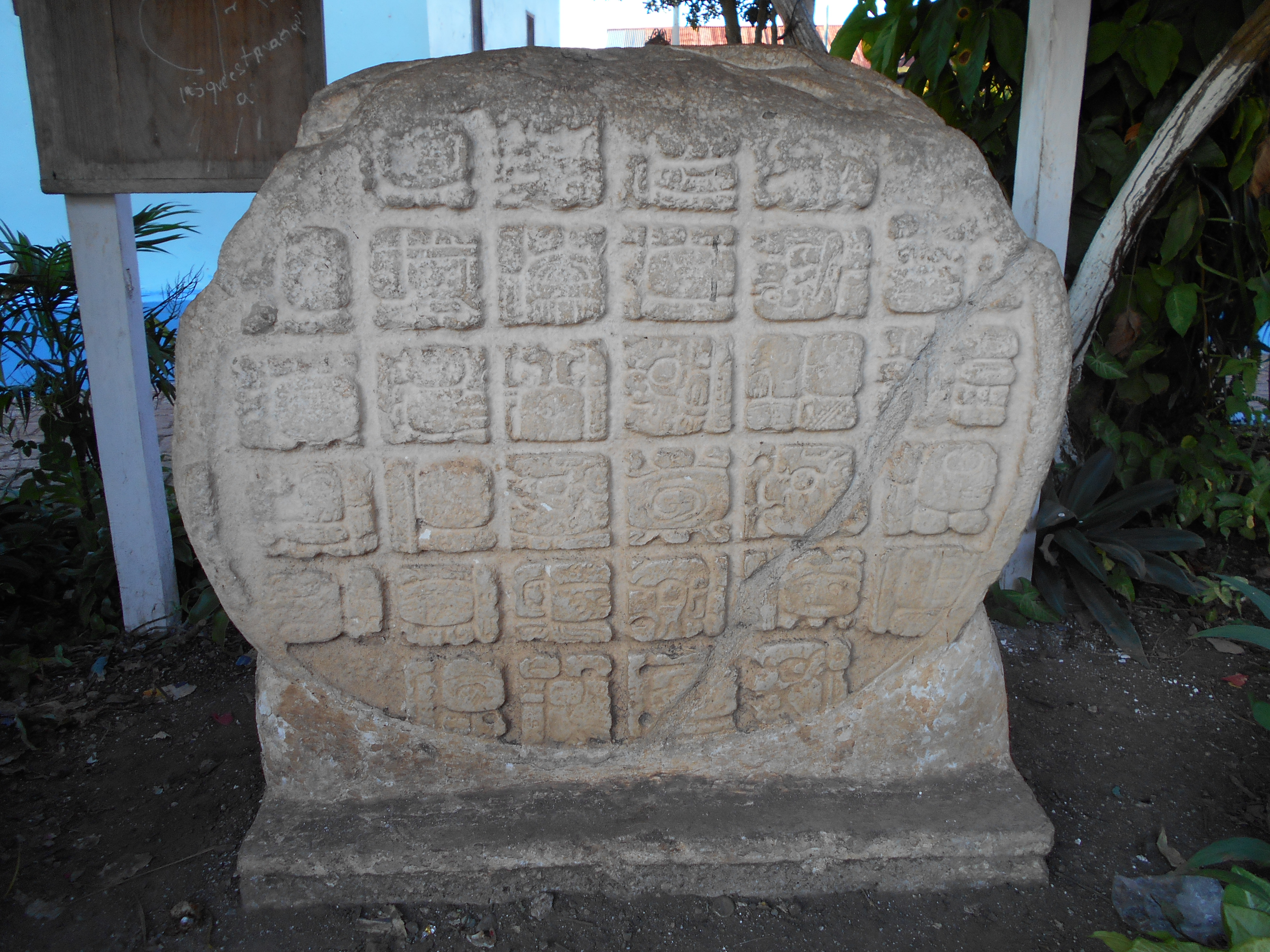
Altar 1 from Ixlu, which contains a section of text comprising eight glyphs that are identical to a phrase on the Dos Pilas Stela 8.

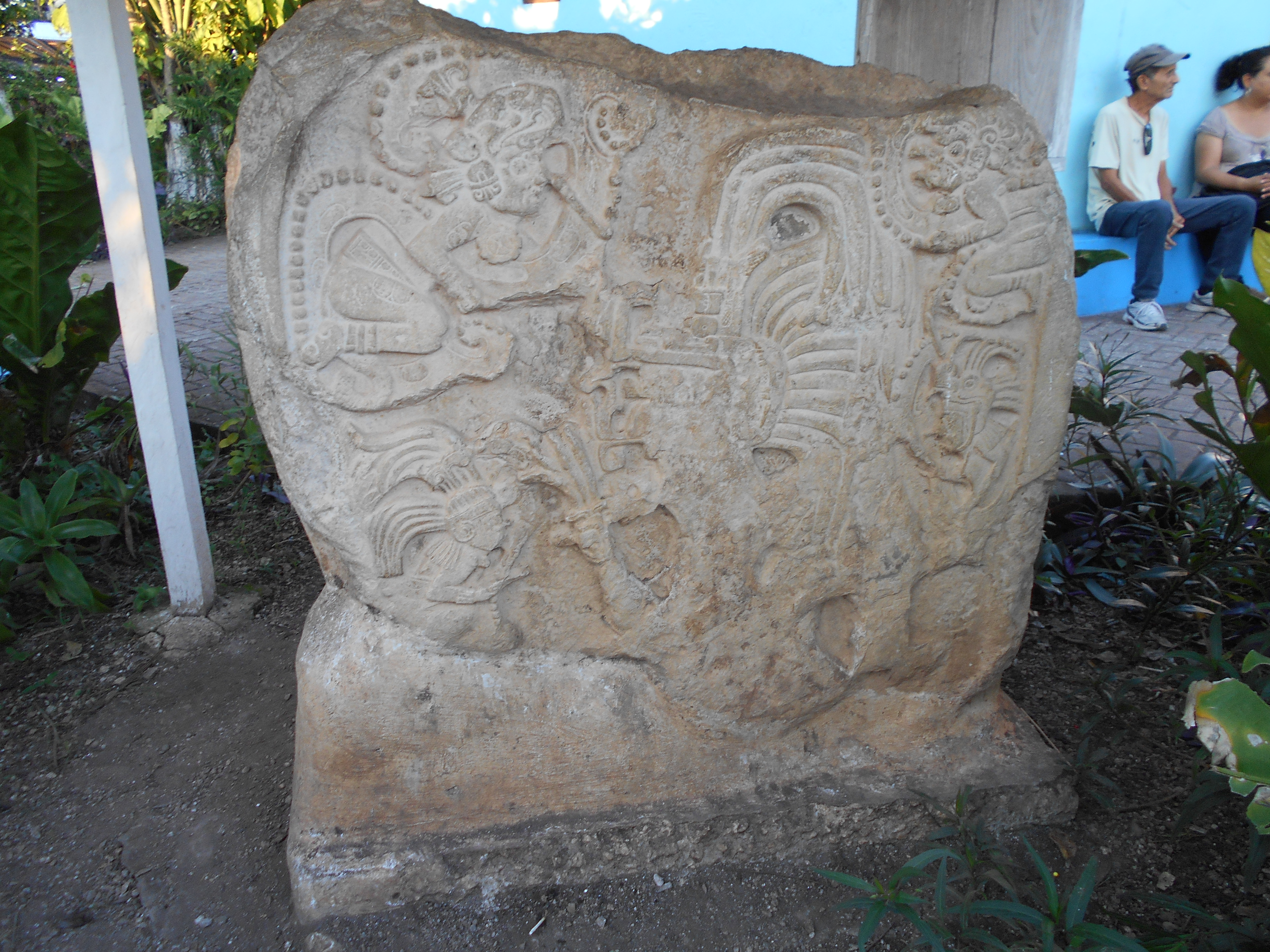
Stela 2 from Ixlu

Four Classic Period sculpted monuments were recovered from the site, two stelae and two altars. Ixlu Stela 1 bears the date 879 AD, in the Late Classic Period, and depicts a ruler who used the Tikal Emblem Glyph and the K'ul Mutul Ahaw title ("holy lord of Tikal"). The stelae at Ixlu resemble traditional Classic Period stelae such as those at Tikal. Both Stelae 1 and 2 show bloodletting rituals and the materialisation of the Paddler Gods. Ixlu Stela 2 is now located in the main plaza of Flores.

The monuments of Ixlu bear some hieroglyphic texts that closely resemble texts from the site of Dos Pilas, suggesting that the lords of Ixlu may have been refugees from the collapse of that state in the Petexbatún region of the Petén Basin, a state that itself professed to have a legitimate claim to the rulership of Tikal.

== See also ==
- Topoxte
- List of Maya sites

== Notes ==
=== References ===
- Aguilar, Boris A. (2001). "Las excavaciones en el Templo de las Vasijas Escondidas en Ixlu, Flores, Petén" [Excavations in the Temple of the Hidden Jars in Ixlu, Flores, Peten] (PDF). XIV Simposio de Investigaciones Arqueológicas en Guatemala, 2000 (edited by J.P. Laporte, A.C. Suasnávar and B. Arroyo) (in Spanish). Guatemala: Museo Nacional de Arqueología y Etnología: 259–274. Archived from the original (versión digital) on 2011-07-07.
- Bey, George J. III; Craig A. Hanson; William M. Ringle (September 1997). "Classic to Postclassic at Ek Balam, Yucatan: Architectural and Ceramic Evidence for Defining the Transition". Latin American Antiquity. 8 (3). Washington, DC: Society for American Archaeology: 237–254. doi:10.2307/971654. JSTOR 971654.
- Castellanos Cabrera, Jeanette (2008). "Buenavista-Nuevo San José, Petén, Guatemala: Another village from the Middle Preclassic (800-400 BC)" (PDF). Foundation for the Advancement of Mesoamerican Studies, Inc. (FAMSI). Archived from the original (PDF) on 2008-12-02.
- Drew, David (1999). The Lost Chronicles of the Maya Kings. London: Weidenfeld & Nicolson. ISBN 0-297-81699-3. OCLC 43401096.
- Jones, Grant D. (2009). "The Kowoj in Ethnohistorical Perspective". In Pridence M. Rice; Don S. Rice (eds.). The Kowoj: identity, migration, and geopolitics in late postclassic Petén, Guatemala. Boulder, Colorado: University Press of Colorado. pp. 55–69. ISBN 978-0-87081-930-8. OCLC 225875268.
- Kelly, Joyce (1996). An Archaeological Guide to Northern Central America: Belize, Guatemala, Honduras, and El Salvador. Norman: University of Oklahoma Press. ISBN 0-8061-2858-5. OCLC 34658843.
- Martin, Simon; Nikolai Grube (2000). Chronicle of the Maya Kings and Queens: Deciphering the Dynasties of the Ancient Maya. London and New York: Thames & Hudson. ISBN 0-500-05103-8. OCLC 47358325.
- Sánchez Polo, Rómulo; Don S. Rice; Prudence M. Rice; Anna McNair; Timothy Pugh; Grant D. Jones (1995). J.P. Laporte; H. Escobedo (eds.). "La investigación de la geografía política del siglo XVII en Petén central: La primera temporada" [Investigation of the 17th century political geography of central Peten: First season] (PDF). VIII Simposio de Investigaciones Arqueológicas en Guatemala, 1994 (in Spanish). Guatemala: Museo Nacional de Arqueología y Etnología: 589–602. Archived from the original (versión digital) on 2011-07-07.
- Schele, Linda; David Freidel (1990). A Forest of Kings: The Untold Story of the Ancient Maya. New York: William Morrow and Company. ISBN 0-688-11204-8. OCLC 24501607.
- Sharer, Robert J.; Loa P. Traxler (2006). The Ancient Maya (6th (fully revised) ed.). Stanford, CA: Stanford University Press. ISBN 0-8047-4817-9. OCLC 57577446.
- Valdés, Juan Antonio; Fahsen, Federico (2005). "Disaster in Sight: The Terminal Classic at Tikal and Uaxactun". In Arthur A. Demarest; Prudence M. Rice; Don S. Rice (eds.). The Terminal Classic in the Maya lowlands: Collapse, transition, and transformation. Boulder: University Press of Colorado. pp. 162–194. ISBN 0-87081-822-8. OCLC 61719499.
- Webster, David L. (2002). The Fall of the Ancient Maya: Solving the Mystery of the Maya Collapse. London: Thames & Hudson. ISBN 0-500-05113-5. OCLC 48753878.
