= Yaxha =

Archeological site

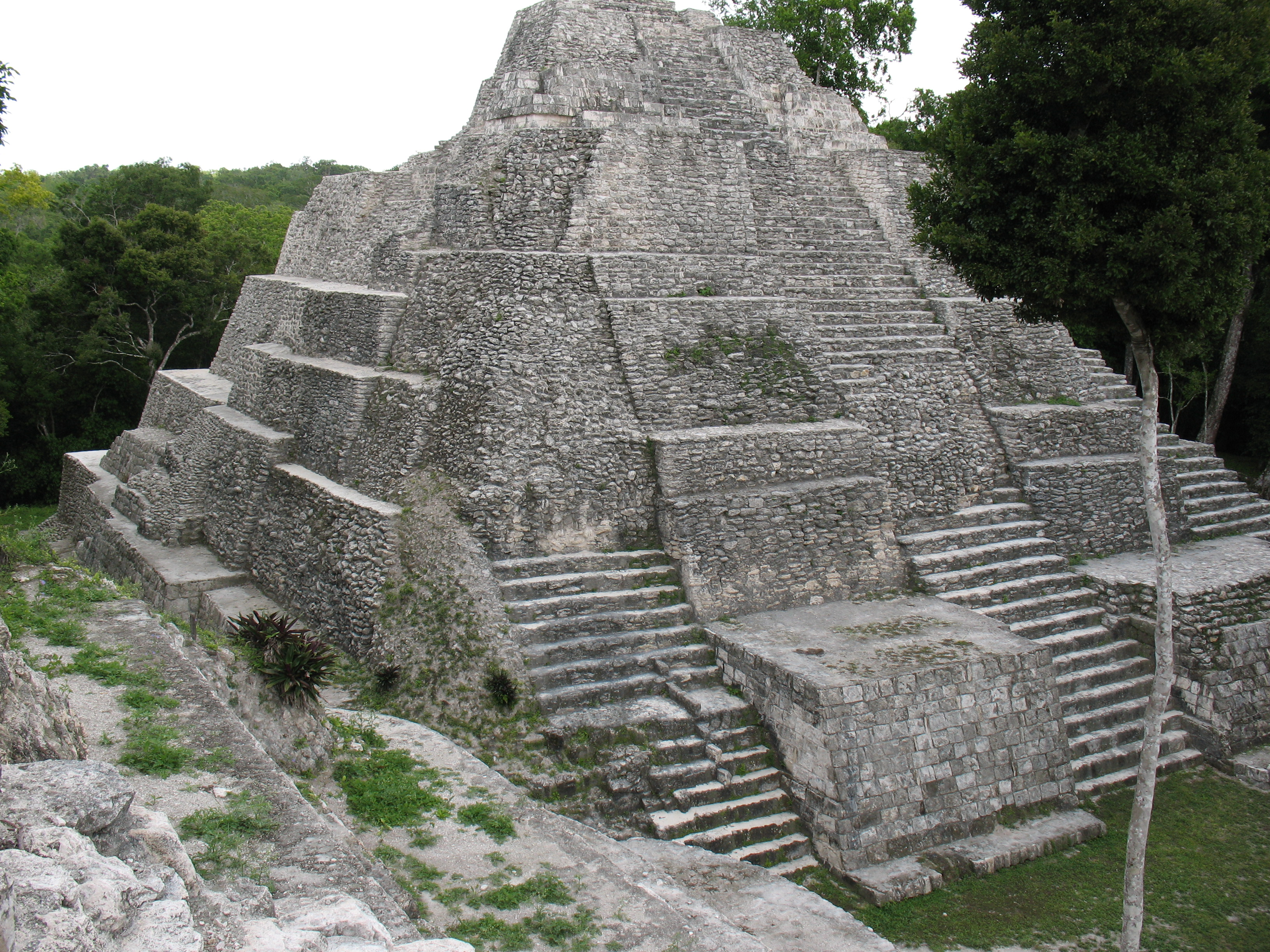
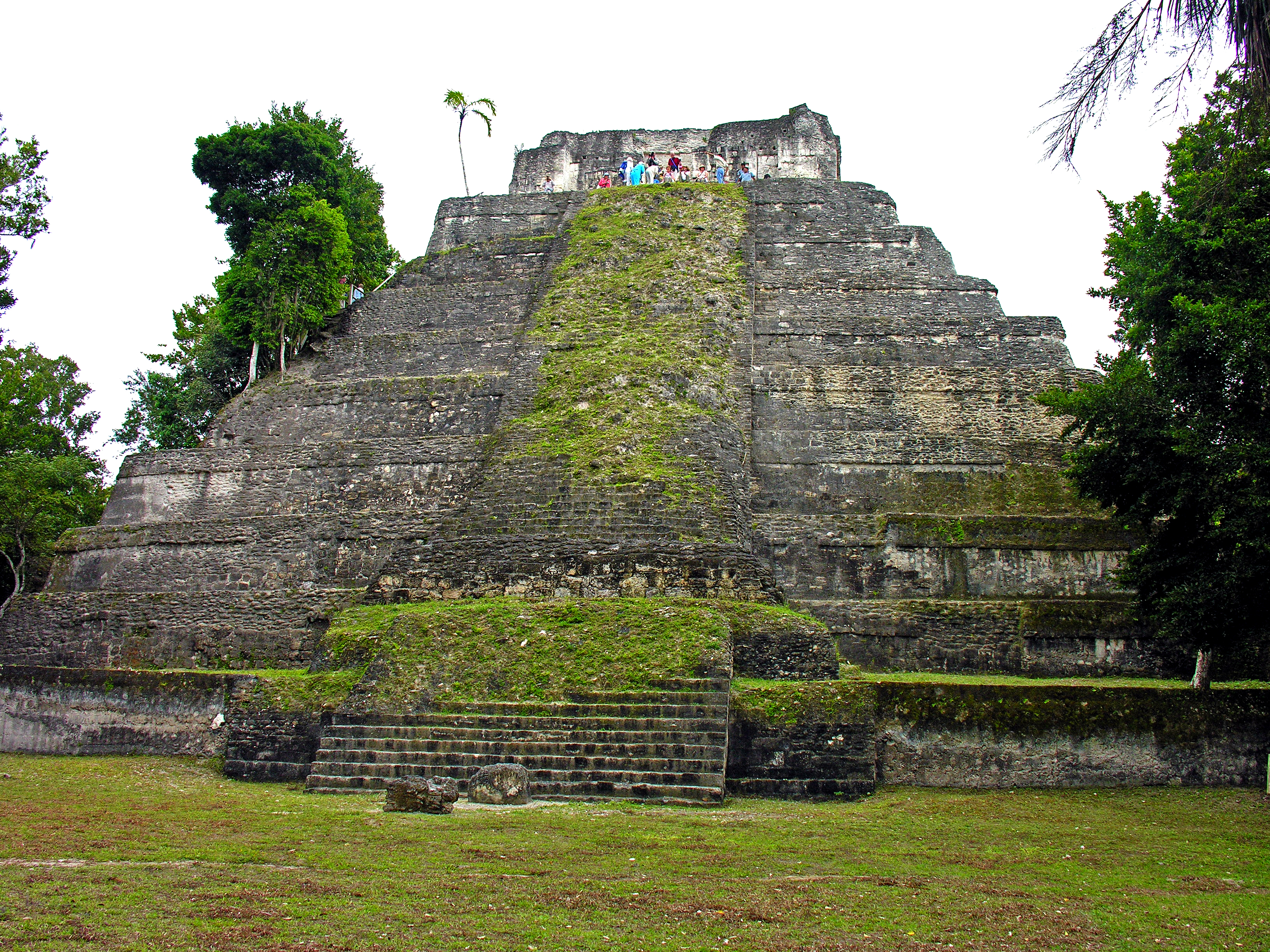
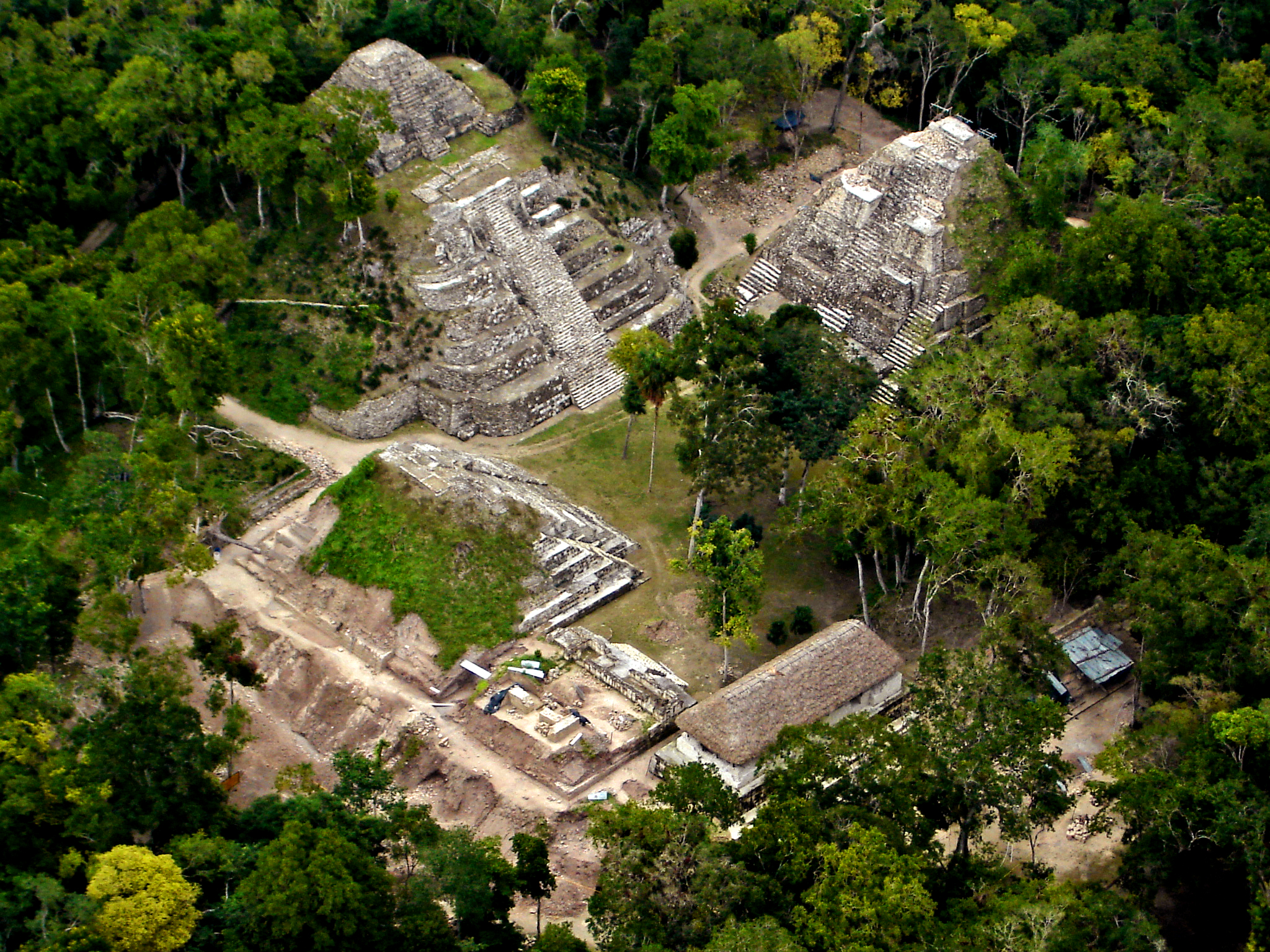
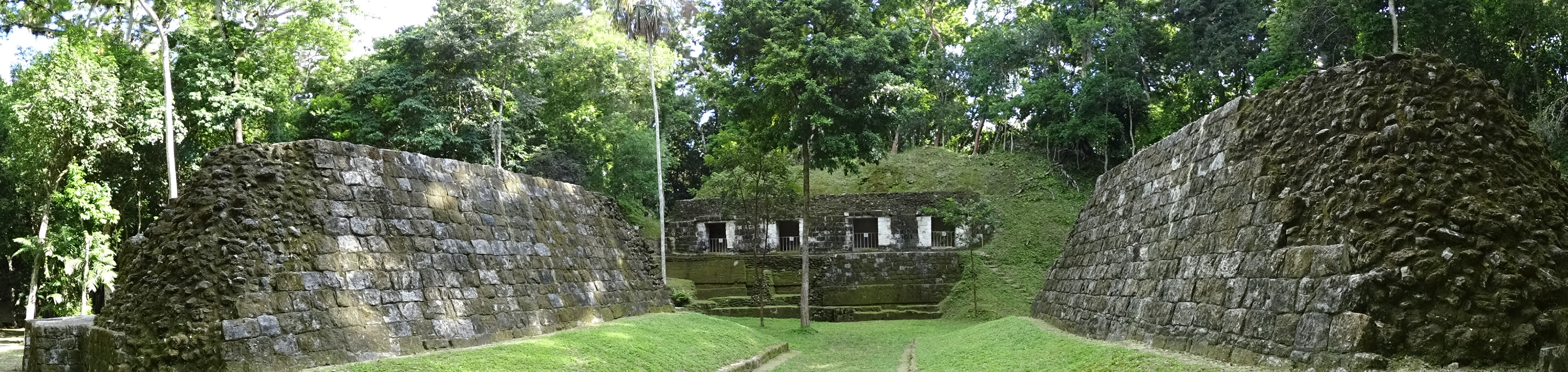
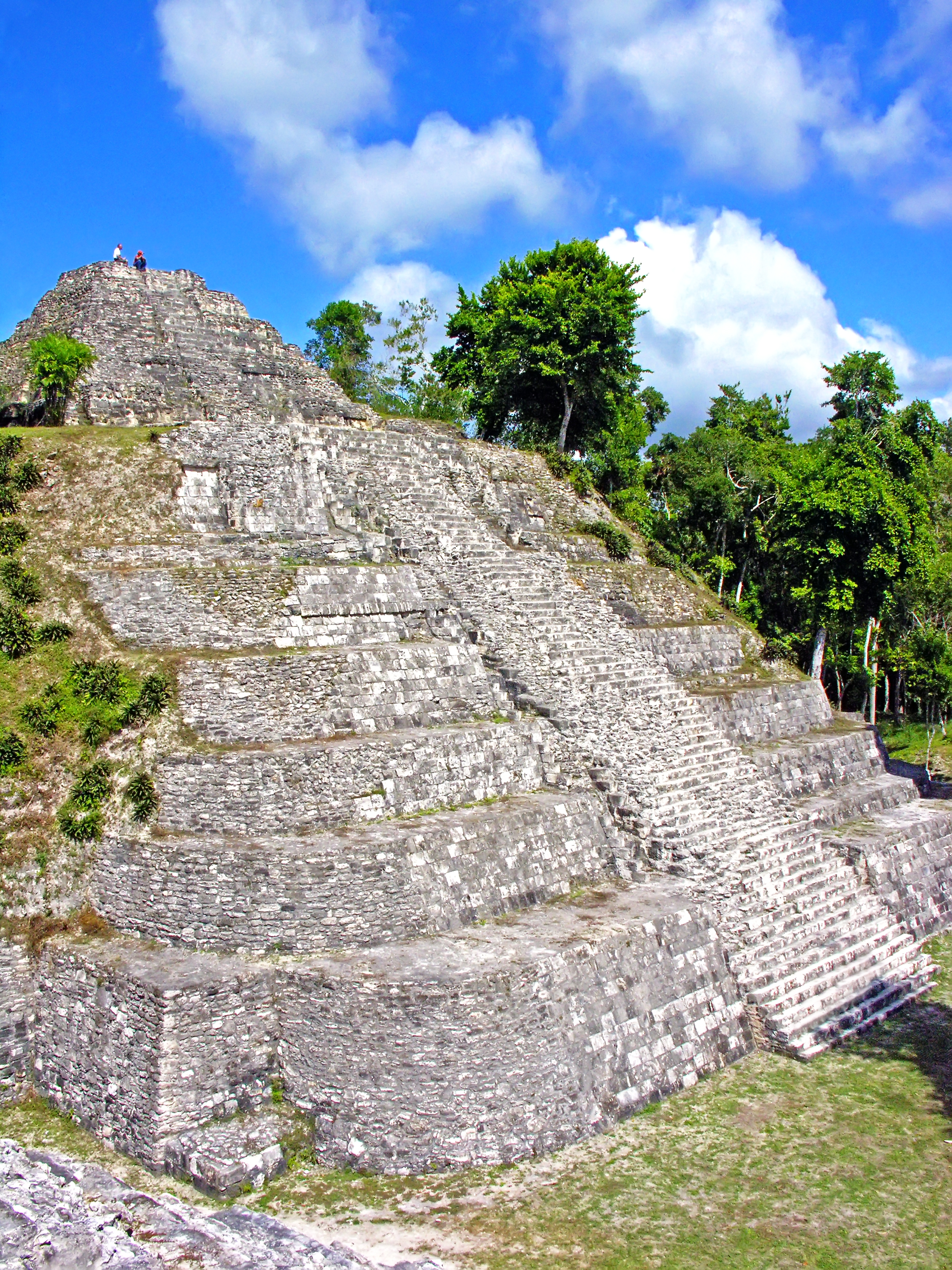
- View of the archaeological site of Yaxhá

- Location within Mesoamerica Location within Guatemala
- 17°4′39″N 89°24′9″W
- Periods: Preclassic and Classic Periods
- Cultures: Maya
- Location: Flores
- Region: Petén Department, Guatemala

History
- Built: Middle Preclassic
- Abandoned: Terminal Classic

Site notes
- Architectural styles: Preclassic and Classic Maya
- Excavation dates: 1970s onwards
- Archaeologists: Bernard Hermes Proyecto Nacional Tikal
- Responsible body: IDAEH

Yaxha (or Yaxhá in Spanish orthography) is a Mesoamerican archaeological site in the northeast of the Petén Basin in modern-day Guatemala. As a ceremonial centre of the pre-Columbian Maya civilization, Yaxha was the third largest city in the region and experienced its maximum power during the Early Classic period (c. AD 250–600).

Geographically situated on a prominent limestone ridge between Lake Yaxha and Lake Sacnab, the city occupied a strategic position controlling ancient trade routes across the eastern Petén lakes region. The name of the city derives from the Mayan yaxa', meaning "blue-green water," representing a rare survival of an authentic Classic period toponym into modern usage. The Yaxha polity controlled an estimated territory of 237 square kilometres (92 sq mi) within what is now the Yaxha-Nakum-Naranjo National Park, reaching a peak population of approximately 42,000 during the Late Classic period of Mesoamerican chronology.

Yaxha had a long history of occupation with the first settlement being founded sometime in the Middle Preclassic period (c. 1000–350 BC). It developed into the largest city in the eastern Petén lakes region during the Late Preclassic (c. 350 BC – AD 250) and expanded into an enormous city during the Early Classic (c. AD 250–600). At this time, in common with other sites in Petén, it shows strong influence from the distant metropolis of Teotihuacan in the Valley of Mexico. It was eclipsed during the Late Classic (c. AD 600–900) by neighbouring Naranjo but was never completely dominated. The city survived well into the Terminal Classic (c. 800–900) but was abandoned by the Postclassic period (c. 900–1525).

The ruins of the city were first reported by Teoberto Maler who visited them in 1904. The site was mapped in the 1930s and again in the 1970s and stabilisation work began in the late 1980s. The ruins include the remains of more than 500 structures with a number of major archaeological groups linked by causeways. Approximately 40 Maya stelae have been discovered at the site, about half of which feature sculpture.

== Etymology ==
The name Yaxha derives from the Mayan yaxa', which means "blue-green water". Yaxha is notable for the survival of its toponym from the Classic period, when it was a thriving city. David Stuart first proposed that the emblem glyph of the site should be read Yax-ha and that the name of the city (and the lake) is of ancient origin.

== Location ==
Located in the modern-day department of Petén, northern Guatemala, it is approximately 30 kilometres (19 mi) southeast of Tikal; Yaxha is situated on the north shore of Lake Yaxha; the ruins extend roughly 3 kilometres (1.9 mi) along a hilltop parallel to the lake shore. The ruins fall within the borders of the Yaxha-Nakum-Naranjo National Park, which encompasses an area of 37,160 hectares (143.5 sq mi) and incorporates the remains of four ancient Maya cities: Yaxha, Topoxte, Nakum and Naranjo, as well as 10 intermediate sites and more than 280 smaller settlements.

== Paleolimnology and Wetland Hydrogeology ==
The spatial development of Yaxha was fundamentally dictated by the limnological dynamics of the closed-basin Lake Yaxha and Lake Sacnab system. Geochemically isolated from major river discharge, these endorheic lakes preserved long-term paleoclimate records within their laminated sediment cores, detailing cycles of prehistoric soil erosion and land clearance associated with Classic Maya agriculture.

- Endorheic Water Chemistry': The distinct blue-green color of Lake Yaxha (ancient yaxa) is driven by high concentrations of dissolved calcium carbonate and gypsum dissolved from the surrounding karstic bedrock, creating a alkaline, low-nutrient (oligotrophic) aquatic environment.
- Sediment Siltation Layers: Stratigraphic analysis of the lakebed shows a prominent "Maya clay" deposit layer corresponding to the Late Preclassic and Early Classic expansion, recording accelerated topsoil wash caused by extensive terrace construction and urban deforestation across the ridge.
- Seasonal Wetland Corridor: The surrounding bajos (seasonal swamps) and lacustrine fringes function as a core neotropical sanctuary within the Maya Biosphere Reserve, harboring dense populations of Morelet's crocodile (Crocodylus moreletii), central American river turtles, and over 150 species of resident and migratory waterfowl.

== Known rulers ==
All dates A.D.

Name	Ruled
K'inich Lakamtuun	c.799

== History ==
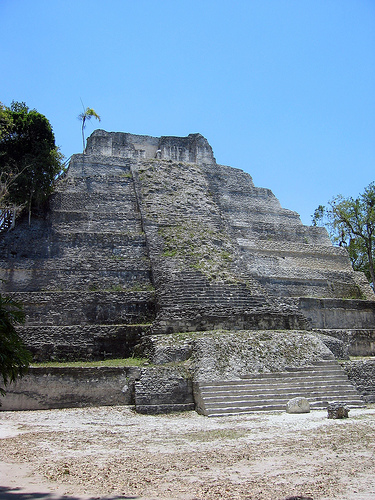
Temple 216 in the East Acropolis at Yaxha

=== Preclassic ===
Yaxha was already significant in the Late Preclassic (c. 350 BC – AD 250), and was a large site as far back as the Middle Preclassic (c. 1000–350 BC). Archaeological investigations indicate that the earliest, Middle Preclassic, settlement was in what developed into the southern and western sectors of the city. In the Late Preclassic the city became the largest settlement in the Yaxha-Sacnab basin, with a marked increase in population and in construction activity.

=== Early Classic ===
The city reached the height of its power during the Early Classic period of Mesoamerican chronology (c. AD 250–600), during which period the city expanded enormously. The city's Early Classic monuments are poorly preserved, meaning that the history of its period of maximum power is poorly understood. The influence of the distant metropolis of Teotihuacan in the Valley of Mexico is evident in Early Classic imagery following Teotihuacan's decisive intervention at Tikal in AD 378. At the end of the Early Classic, seismic activity caused movement of the Yaxha Fault, resulting in damage to buildings in the East Acropolis. The same earthquake appears to have caused damage across the city and at neighbouring Nakum. The earthquake may have resulted in the temporary abandonment of the East Acropolis.

During this period the city established itself as an important centre on the trade routes that crossed the Petén lakes region.

=== Late Classic ===
In the Late Classic (c. AD 600–900) the city developed with major construction projects taking place across the city centre, especially during the 8th century; the twin pyramid complex is an example of one of the major construction projects undertaken at this time. At this time the city became an important trading centre to the southeast of the great city of Tikal. During the Late Classic the city fought several wars against the neighbouring city of Naranjo, which had eclipsed Yaxha in power but was never able to complete dominate it. In 710, king K'ak' Tiliw Chan Chaak of Naranjo sacked Yaxha, captured its king and sacrificed him.

In the latter 8th century, king K'ak' Ukalaw Chan Chaak of Naranjo took a Yaxha princess as his wife; Lady Shell Star provided the king with his heir. This heir was unable to maintain peace between the cities and Itzamnaaj K'awiil of Naranjo went to war against Yaxha and its allies in AD 799, launching assaults against his mother's city in July and September of that year, some months after defeating a number of Yaxha's satellites. He managed to capture K'inich Lakamtuun, Yaxha's king.

=== Terminal Classic ===
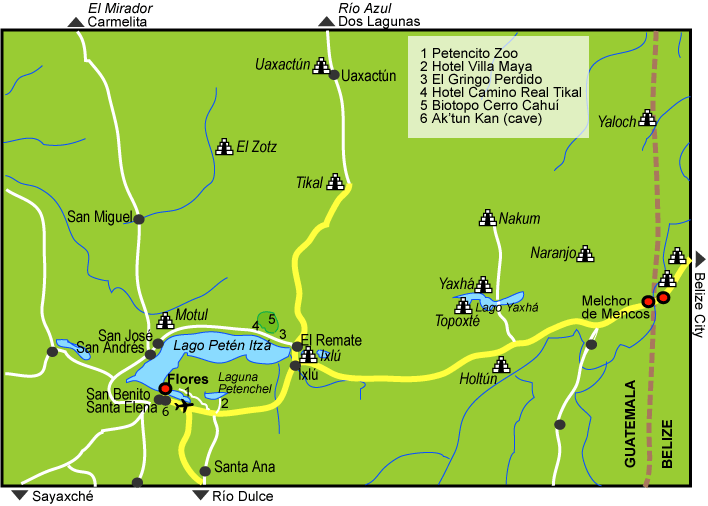
Map of the eastern Petén lakes region

There is no evidence of the rapid collapse of the Yaxha polity in the Terminal Classic (c. AD 800–900) as took place at other cities in the vicinity. Instead there is evidence of renewed and widespread construction activity. It is apparent that the local elite made every effort to prolong the city's Late Classic political system. Some entry controls to the city were removed in order to encourage the flow of visitors to Yaxha from surrounding areas that were more immediately affected by the Classic Maya collapse.

=== Postclassic ===
During the Postclassic (c. 900–1525) there is some evidence of activity at the site associated with the inhabited islands of Lake Yaxha but these were not in any way associated with occupation of the city itself, rather consisting of pieces of ceramic and food refuse left at the city by the islanders.

=== Modern history ===
Teoberto Maler first reported Yaxha's existence after visiting the ruins in 1904. The Carnegie Institution of Washington mapped the ruins in the 1930s and the site was again mapped in the early 1970s, at which time test excavations were undertaken. The Proyecto Nacional Tikal ("National Tikal Project") carried out a survey of architectural damage at Yaxha in 1987 and in 1988 the first work was undertaken in order to stabilise some of the structures. Archaeological excavations have continued into the 21st century; The South Acropolis was excavated from 2005 through to 2007. The early 21st century excavations of Yaxha formed a part of the Peten Sustainable Development Programme (Programa de Desarrollo Sostenible de Petén) funded by the Banco Interamericano de Desarollo (Inter-American Development Bank).

== Site description ==
Yaxha is the third largest ruin in Guatemala, with only Tikal and El Mirador being larger. The centre of the city consisted of a number of plazas and architectural groups, with outlying groups and the lake shore linked by causeways. The main architectural groups are the Maler Group to the north, linked to the central area by the Blom Causeway; the South (or Main) Acropolis, the West Group, the Northeast Acropolis, the East Acropolis and a number of plazas and lesser groups make up the site core. The city was linked to the shore of Lake Yaxha by the Lake Causeway. Plaza A is a twin pyramid complex. Ten main communication routes have been identified in the city, with the four principal routes having been classified as causeways by archaeologists, with the remainder classed as "vias". Yaxha was more densely occupied than most other Maya cities.

The site has more than 500 structures, including about 40 stelae, 13 Altars, 9 temple pyramids, 2 Mesoamerican ballcourts, and a network of sacbeob (causeways) that connect the central, northern (Maler), and eastern 'acropoleis', and the Lake causeway that was the main entrance in the past. The top of Temple 216 (restored) provides a view of the two lakes on one side and the jungle and the stepped-pyramids on the other.

Yaxha possesses one of very few twin pyramid complexes outside of Tikal; the fact that the site holds a twin-pyramid complex provides a visible insight into the political alliances that eventually influenced the architectural style of the city at its peak, although it appears that the complex at Yaxha was unfinished.

=== Architectural groups ===
Plaza A is a twin pyramid complex to the north of the East Acropolis. It was built during the 8th century AD.

Plaza B is on the west side of the East Acropolis.

Plaza C is an E-Group astronomical complex to the southeast of the site core, linked to the city centre by the Lincloln Causeway. Three Early Classic stelae were erected on the east side of the plaza.

Plaza D is in the site core, at the northwest end of the Lincoln Causeway and immediately north of the South Acropolis. It is bordered to the north by the Northeast Acropolis.

Plaza E is situated in the site core, on the north side of the South Acropolis and linked to it via a stairway rising from the plaza.

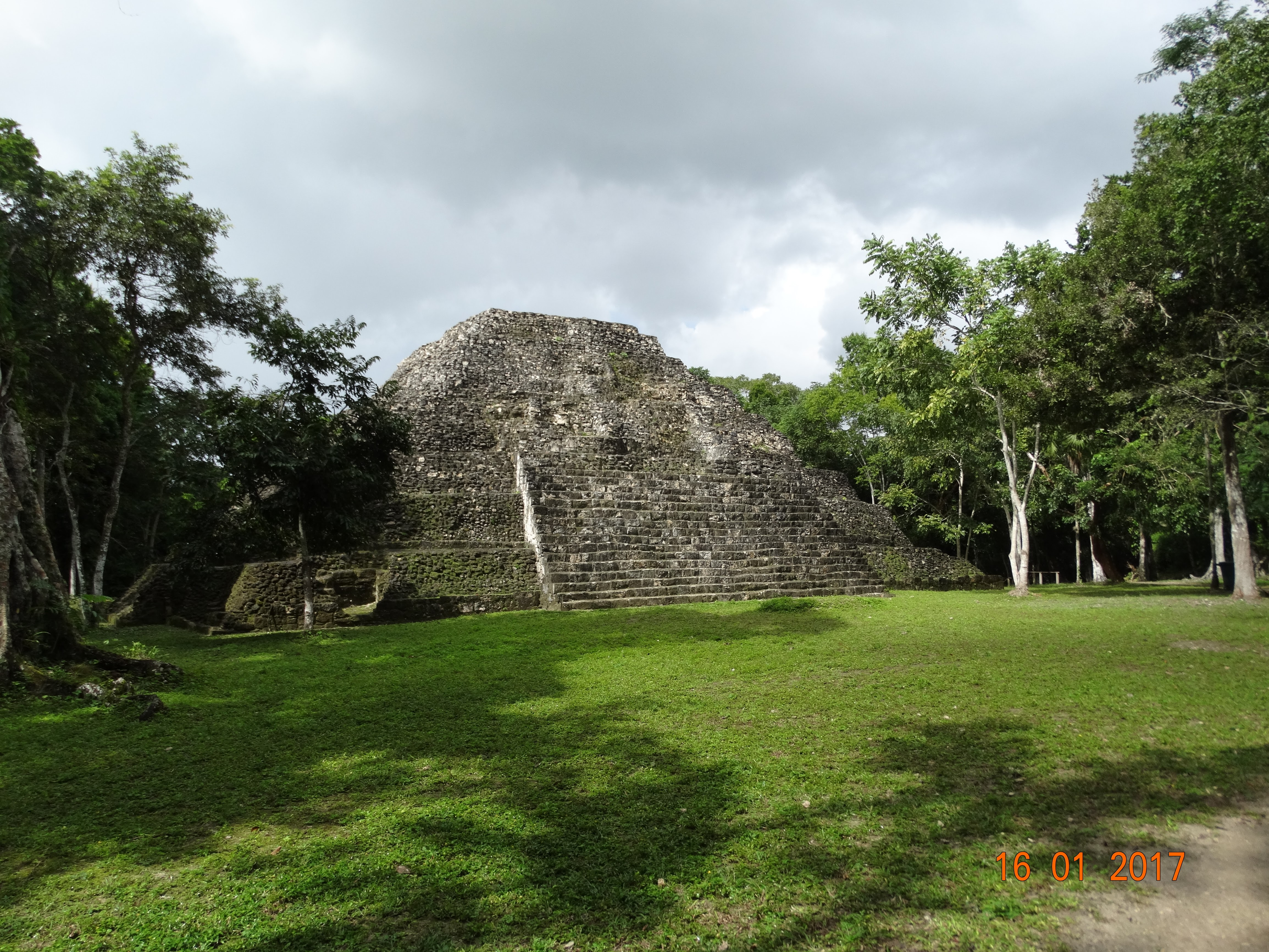
Calzada de los Peregrinos

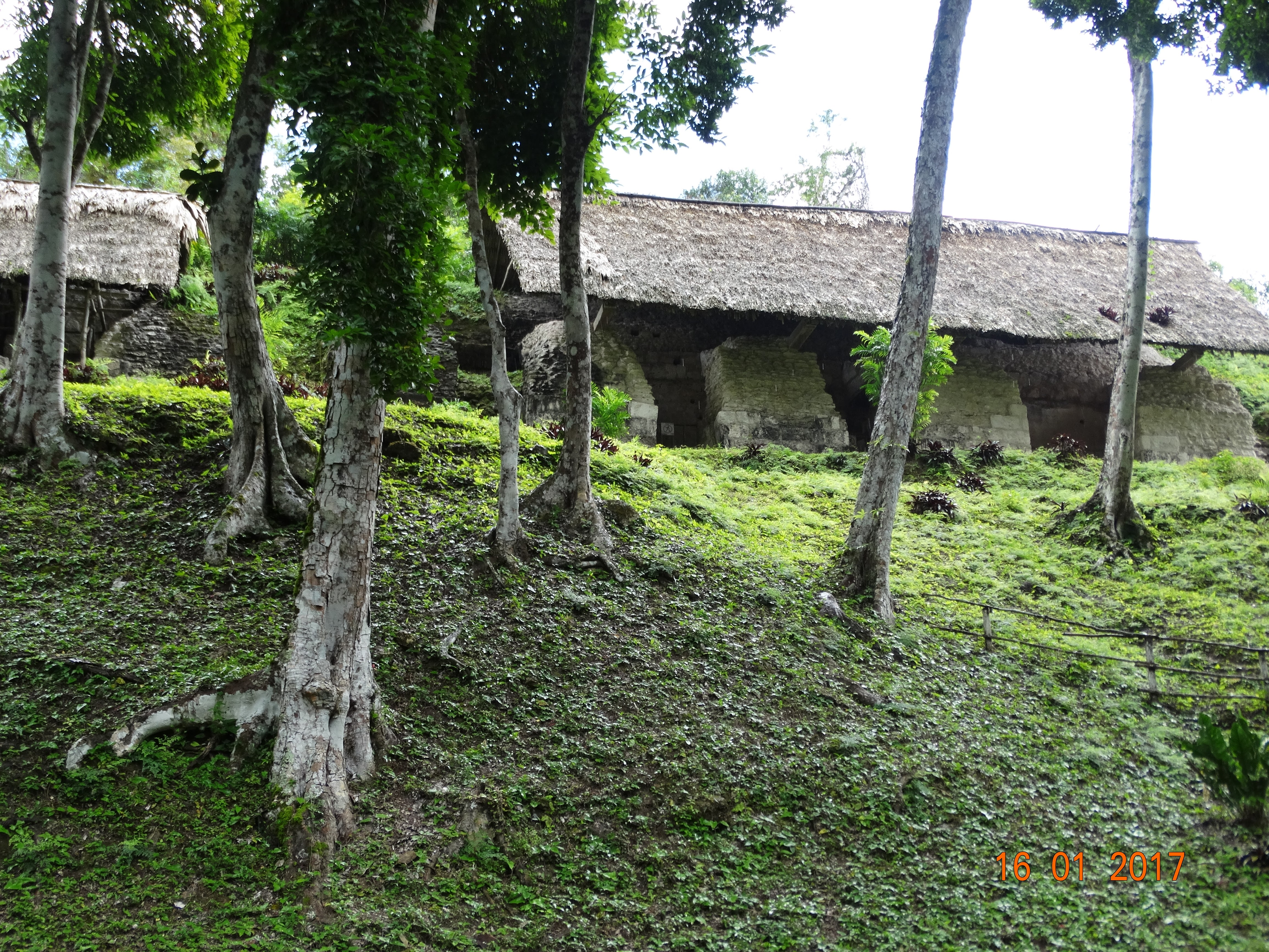
Ruins on the Plaza B (Plaza de las Columnas)

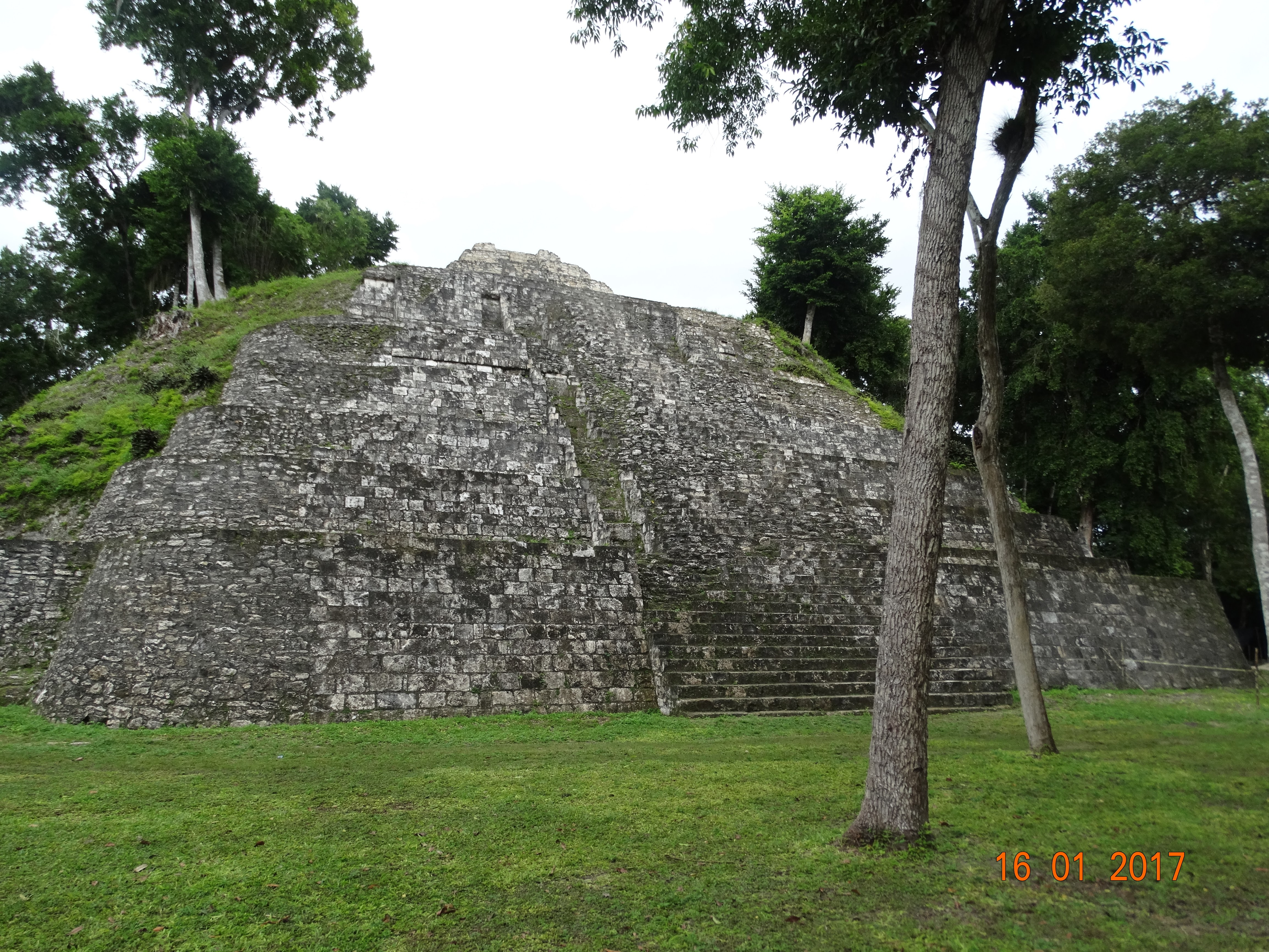
Acropolis Norte (Plaza E)

The East Acropolis is on the east side of the city centre, to the south of the Twin Pyramid Complex. It occupies the highest area of the city and is surrounded by Plazas A, B and C. The area that was to become occupied by the East Acropolis was first levelled from the limestone bedrock in the Middle Preclassic. In the Preclassic the East Acropolis was laid out as a triadic pyramid complex but was radically modified during the Early Classic. In its final form the East Acropolis formed a closed complex with twelve structures covering a total area of 8,100 square metres (87,000 sq ft). The main buildings of the East Acropolis were Structure 216, a pyramid-temple, and Structure 218, a palace. The East Acropolis plaza featured a west-facing monumental stairway built in the Late Preclassic and remodelled in the Late Classic. The first version of the temple was built in the Late Preclassic, while the earliest version of the palace dates to the Early Classic. The East Acropolis appears to have been temporarily abandoned at the end of the Early Classic due to destruction caused by an earthquake, but was reoccupied and developed during the course of the Late Classic. During the Terminal Classic (9th century AD) great quantities of ash and domestic ceramics were deposited in the East Acropolis. At this time a small platform was built against Structure 219, which blocked access to the southwestern terrace of the complex.

The Northeast Acropolis dates back to the Late Preclassic and incorporates an arrangement that includes a triadic pyramid forming a part of an E-Group astronomical complex.

The South Acropolis, sometimes referred to as the Main Acropolis, was built upon a high karstic hill. It had a long history, with construction starting at the end of the Middle Preclassic period and continuing through to the Terminal Classic. The acropolis is a complex consisting of six patio groups upon an artificial platform and includes a Mesoamerican ballcourt (Ballcourt 1). The patios are separated by corbel-vaulted structures that were probably elite residences; the exception is Structure 363, which is a temple between Patio 5 and Patio 6. The South Acropolis is located in the southern portion of the site core near the junction of various causeways and vias. The acropolis is bordered on the north side by the ballcourt and plazas D and E. It is bordered on the western side by Via 5 and on the southern side by Via 6. In its final form during the Terminal Classic the basal platform formed an irregular rectangle measuring 200 metres (660 ft) east-west by 100 to 120 metres (330 to 390 ft) north-south. The platform had stepped levels and rounded corners; the principal access appears to have been a stairway on the west half of the north side, which linked Plaza E with Patios 5 and 6 of the acropolis. Excavations of the acropolis took place in 1996 and 2006; excavators found evidence of earlier archaeological investigation that had not been recorded and suggested professional investigation in the 1970s.

The Maler Group is located to the north of the site core, linked to it by the Blom Causeway.

=== Structures ===
Structure 216 is a large pyramid on the east side of Plaza A upon the East Acropolis. The remains of the temple shrine still stand upon the pyramidal base and the total height of the structure is over 30 metres (100 ft), making it the tallest structure at Yaxha. The earliest structure on the site was the plaza platform raised in the Late Preclassic, which consisted of a five-stepped platform with talud walls and an inset 17.5-metre (57 ft) wide west-facing monumental stairway, consisting of 32 steps, each with a 0.45 metres (1.5 ft) tread and a 0.35 metres (1.1 ft) riser. This Late Preclassic phase stood about 11 metres (36 ft) high. In the Early Classic a new version of the structure was built (Structure 216 sub 1). It was a stepped platform, like its predecessor, although the stairway of the new version projected westwards, possibly flanked by balustrades. The maximum height of this construction phase was 22.75 metres (74.6 ft). In the 8th century AD a new version of Structure 216 was built, rising to a height of 23.25 metres (76.3 ft). The pyramid base had eight stepped levels with rounded corners and featured a projecting stairway. The summit shrine had three doorways and two inner chambers. Stela 41 was raised at the base of the stairway. An offering was found in the fill under the first chamber of the temple that consisted of seven eccentrics, five of them crafted from obsidian and two from flint, and a piece of mother of pearl.

Structure 217 is a palace-type structure at the north end of Structure 218 in the East Acropolis. The first phase of construction dates to the Early Classic. In the 8th century the structure was redesigned. It stood upon a basal platform with slightly inclined walls. The structure had two vaulted chambers and was accessed via an east-facing stairway. In the 9th century the base of the structure was dressed with masonry.

Structure 218 is a palace-type structure in the East Acropolis. The earliest version of the building dates to the Early Classic period (Structure 218 sub 1A) and had a long room with a corbel-vaulted roof. The structure had multiple east-facing doorways, possibly five, and two narrow doorways in the centre of the western facade. Traces of red pigment survive on the cornice. The location and characteristic of this Early Classic phase lead archaeologists to believe that it was built slightly after the Early Classic phase of Structure 216 (sub 1). The building was remodelled a number of times in the Early Classic. Stage 1B consisted in the division of the room into three chambers, the addition of a bench inside the north chamber and the addition of small zoomorphic masks to the sunken panels of the cornice. Phase 1C consisted of the addition of a small platform to the western facade. The Early Classic substructure has suffered subsidence at the southern end due to movement of a geological fault. Stage 2A dates to the Late Classic, during the 8th century AD. The western facade became the main facade, the height of the corbel vaulting was reduced and the previous structure was filled. Structure 218 Sub 2A measured 36.5 metres (120 ft) long and was raised upon a 1.85 metres (6.1 ft) high platform. Like the earlier version, it had a long room with a vaulted ceiling; the walls were 1 metre (3.3 ft) thick and the interior vaulting was 2.6 metres (8.5 ft) high. The building featured decorated cornices. The total height of the building as measured from the plaza floor may have been over 6.5 metres (21 ft). The rear, east, side of Stage 2A consisted of three plain, stepped levels. Two benches were built against the corners, possibly to disguise the subsidence that occurred as a result of the earlier earthquake. An offering was deposited underneath the central chamber; it consisted of 9 grey obsidian eccentrics, 14 flint eccentrics, a spondylus shell, a small fragment of greenstone and carbon remains mixed with unidentified vegetable fibres. The following stage, denominated 2B by archaeologists, also dates to the 8th century and consisted of the unification of Structure 218 with the neighbouring structures 217 and 219, creating a new facade with nine doorways. Three vaulted chambers were added to the east facade, with spacing between them; the north and south chambers (A and B) were built over the earlier benches. The central chamber (Chamber C) had flanking stairways. The talud wall between chambers A and C had the remains of a giant mask but the upper section of the wall was demolished by the Terminal Classic occupants of the city. The remains of painted murals were discovered in the interior of the central chamber of the palace, using red, blue, black and yellow pigments. The murals were badly damaged but apparently depicted human figures performing actions near a palace and a ballcourt. A high status Late Classic burial (Burial YX-08) was also found in Structure 218, buried in a cist in front of the main entrance. Four individuals were interred to the south of this principal burial during the Terminal Classic. They were not buried in cists and were unaccompanied by offerings. The bones belonged to individuals of varying ages and gender. At this time, during the 9th century AD, a three-chambered building with a perishable roof was built upon the upper platform of the structure; the chambers were linked by doorways. The only access to the building was via a narrow, sunken stairway built directly over the earthquake fissure. In its final form Structure 218 stood 38 metres (125 ft) high, with four stepped platforms supporting the superstructure. The final remodelling of the building resulted in the blocking of the top of the stairway with a wall.

Structure 219 is another palace-type structure at the south end of Structure 218 in the East Acropolis. The first phase of construction dates to the Early Classic. In the 8th century Structure 219 was rebuilt in a very similar manner to Structure 217, with two vaulted chambers upon a basal platform and an east-facing stairway. During the 9th century, in the Terminal Classic, the base of the structure was dressed with masonry and two small platforms were added to the southeastern portion of the building, one against the north side and the other against the southeastern corner.

Structure 363 is a temple located between Patio 5 and Patio 6 of the South Acropolis. A stone monument was placed in front of the west facade of the temple; the placement of such a monument within an acropolis complex is unusual.

=== Causeways ===
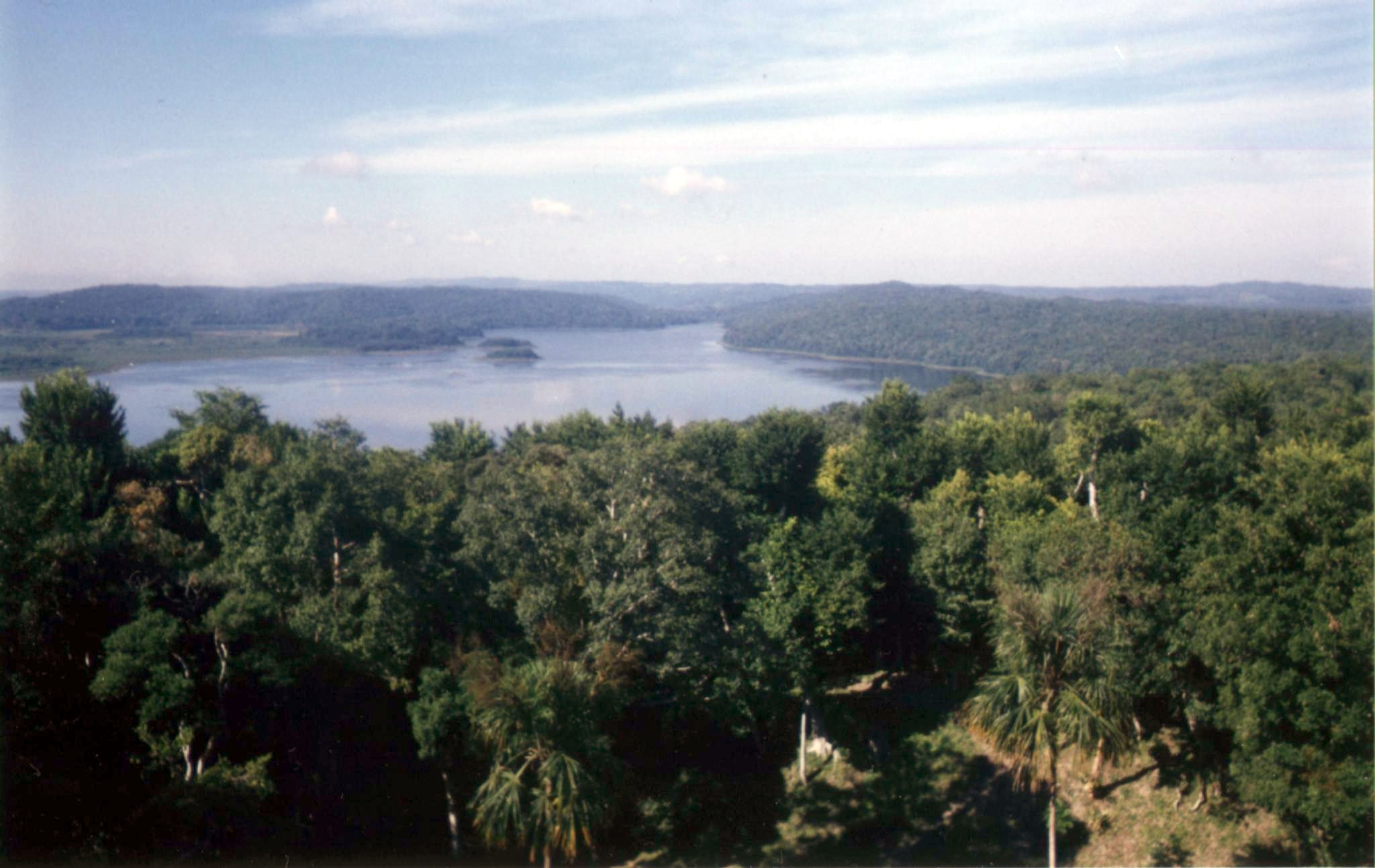
Lake Yaxha viewed from the summit of one of the temples

The Lake Causeway (Calzada del Lago in Spanish) runs north from the lake shore to the city centre, where it continues as Via 5. The total length of the causeway and the via is around 400 metres (1,300 ft). The Lake Causeway was designed to allow the rapid movement of goods and people between the city and the lake, and easy access to water. The Lake Causeway probably developed from a Middle Preclassic pathway that ran between the shore and the early settlement. The earliest version of the Lake Causeway was built in the Late Preclassic; it was about 10 metres (33 ft) wide and was raised 0.5 metres (1.6 ft) above natural ground level. The Via 5 continuation did not exist in the Late Preclassic, when the later city centre had not yet developed. During the Late Classic the causeway was further developed and extended with the formal construction of Via 5 running across the site core. The point where the two met was deliberately narrowed with the construction of flanking buildings and is likely to have been a guard post where access to the site core was controlled. It is likely that travellers and goods arriving at the city were inspected and taxed at this control point. At its narrowest point the entrance from the causeway to Via 5 was just 2 metres (6.6 ft) wide. Parapets were erected flanking the Lake Causeway; they stood approximately 1 metre (3.3 ft) high and varied from 2 to 3 metres (6.6 to 9.8 ft) wide. The southern extreme of the causeway was modified with the construction of a stucco-covered platform with masonry walls defining the east and south sides. From the southern end of the causeway to the union with Via 5 there is an approximate difference in altitude of more than 50 metres (160 ft). There is some evidence that steps were carved from the limestone bedrock where the southern platform met the Lake Causeway. During a second phase of construction in the Late Classic, the southern platform was enlarged to measure 32 metres (105 ft) east-west by 19 metres (62 ft) north-south. The platform was supported on the south and east sides by refurbished talud walls coated in stucco. The causeway itself was redesigned as a long ramp that joined the southern platform with the city centre and the junction with Via 5. In the Terminal Classic (c. AD 800–900) the southern end of the Lake Causeway was re-dressed with limestone fill. The stepped sides of the southern platform were filled in and covered with stone to form ramps. At about this time Stela A, a plain monument, was erected on the platform. Also in the Terminal Classic the restrictions at the north end of the causeway where it met Via 5 were removed; the whole area was levelled with finely dressed stone and mortar that left the access free for the entire width of the causeway. Ceramic remains recovered from the Lake Causeway are scarce and poorly preserved due to the strong waterflow along the incline caused during the rain season, resulting in artefacts being eroded and washed downhill towards the lake.

The Blom Causeway (Calzada Blom in Spanish) runs north from the city centre to the Maler Group.

The Galindo Causeway (Calzada Galindo in Spanish) runs north–south between the East Acropolis (at the north end) and Plaza C (at the south end).

The Lincoln Causeway (Calzada Lincoln in Spanish) runs southeast from the city centre to Plaza C.

=== Monuments ===
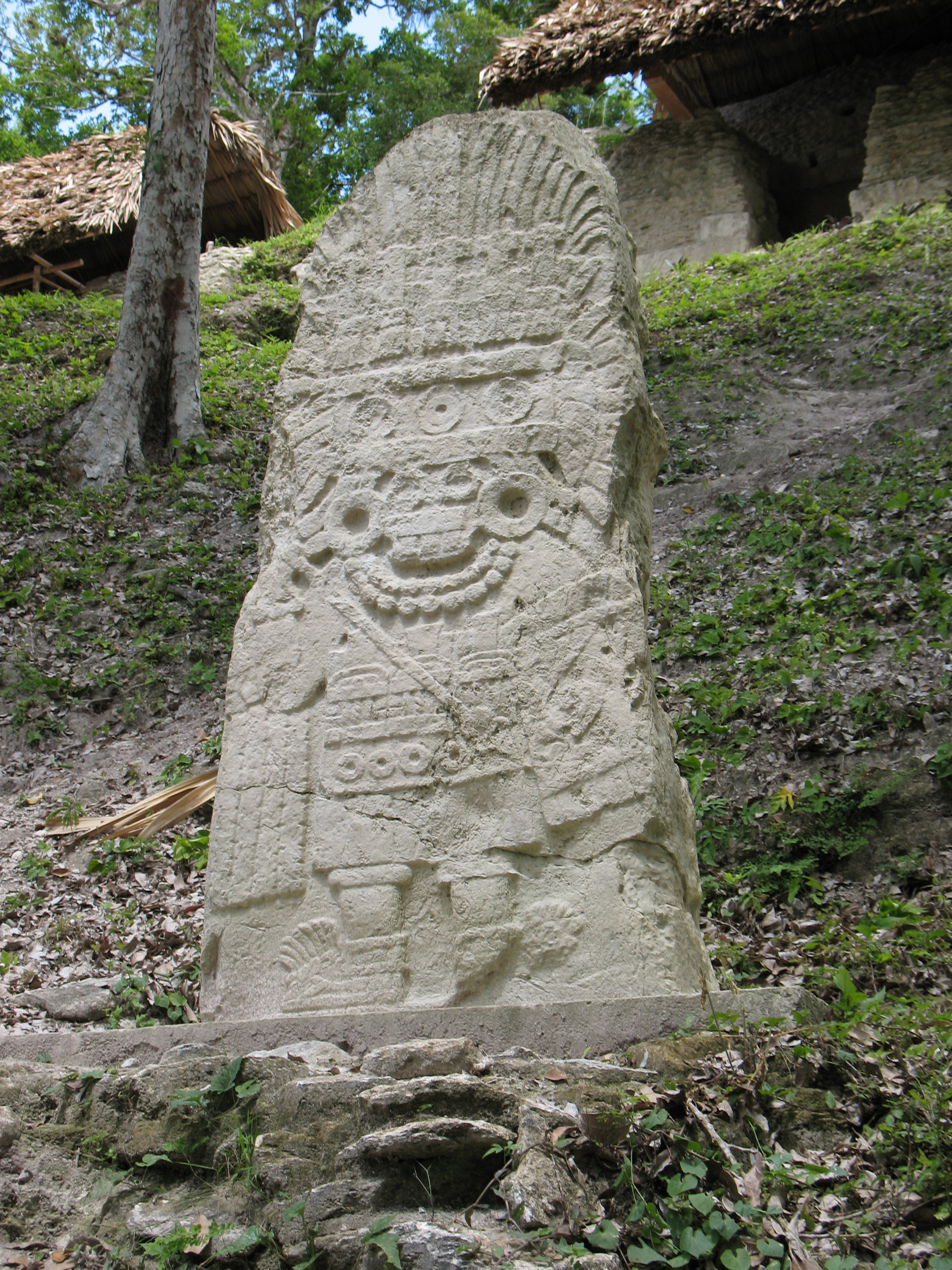
Stela 11 at Yaxha, bearing the Teotihuacan-style image of a warrior with the attributes of Tlaloc, the central Mexican rain god.

Approximately 40 Maya stelae have been recovered at Yaxha, half of which were plain monuments without sculpted faces.

Stela A is a plain stela that was raised upon the platform at the southern (lake-side) end of the Lake Causeway during the Terminal Classic.

Stela 3 is the northernmost of the three stelae erected on the east side of Plaza C. It dates to the Early Classic period and is stylistically related to the Izapan culture of the Pacific coast. It is poorly preserved and only the lower panel survives; it bears a similarity to the equivalent panel on Stela 4.

Stela 4 is the central stela on the east side of Plaza C and is the best preserved of the three Early Classic monuments. It bears the sculpted image of a standing figure with left-facing feet standing upon a grotesque head. Two hieroglyphs are carved to the left of the figure's knees. One of the glyphs preserved on Stela 4 is the Emblem Glyph of Yaxha.

Stela 5 is the southern stela of the three on the east side of Plaza C. It is badly eroded but has been dated to AD 357, making it the earliest dated monument at the city.

Stela 8 is found in the Maler Group. It dates to the Early Classic and is poorly preserved with only the lower portion surviving.

Stela 10 is situated in the Maler Group. It is badly damaged with only the lower portion surviving. It has been dated to the Early Classic.

Stela 11 is a well preserved Early Classic monument on the east side of Plaza B, at the base of Structure 218 in the East Acropolis. The style of the stela is that of Teotihuacan, with the sculpted figure of a warrior with the attributes of Tlaloc, the central Mexican rain deity. The figure bears characteristic eye rings, and a butterfly ornament over the mouth, and wears a feathered headdress. The warrior carries a spear and a shield. The monument is very similar to Stela 32 from Tikal and is associated with the intervention of Teotihuacan in the Petén region during the Early Classic period.

Stela 13 was a sculpted monument but it has been broken into fragments, although much of the sculpture is preserved. The text on the stela includes a date in 793, the latest recorded date at the city. The stela was erected at the base of the West Pyramid of the Twin Pyramid Complex. Stela 13 bears the image of a king of Yaxha together with a text describing the celebration of an equinox.

Stela 30 is the northernmost of two stelae found in Plaza E. It is broken in two pieces. It dates to the Early Classic.

Stela 31 is located in Plaza E. It dates to the Late Classic and depicts an ornate figure with a large headdress. The monument is badly damaged and broken into several pieces.

Stela 36 is a badly eroded monument on the west side of Plaza B.

Stela 41 was raised at the base of the access stairway of Temple 216 in the 8th century AD. The monument is missing its butt, and may not be in its original location; all four sides are sculpted in an Early Classic iconographic style. The front face of the stela has two masks facing to the left and an anthropomorphic figure wearing a bracelet of a type used from the end of the Late Preclassic through to the Early Classic. The hieroglyphic inscriptions on the north and south faces of the stela are eroded but include a glyph that could be the Emblem Glyph of Yaxha.

== Burials ==
Burial YX-08 was excavated from in front of the main entrance to Structure 218, a palace-type building in the East Acropolis. The remains were deposited in a cist and possibly belonged to a member of the city's elite. The remains were those of a young adult male in his early twenties, interred lying upon his back with his skull towards the north. The skull was deformed and the upper incisors were artificially modified with jade incrustations. Two pieces of sculpted jade were found near the neck, one of them a square plaque inscribed with an anthropomorphic figure. Both of the jade pieces had traces of red pigment.
