= Cultural Triangle Yaxha-Nakum-Naranjo National Park =

National park in Petén, Guatemala

- Triángulo Cultural
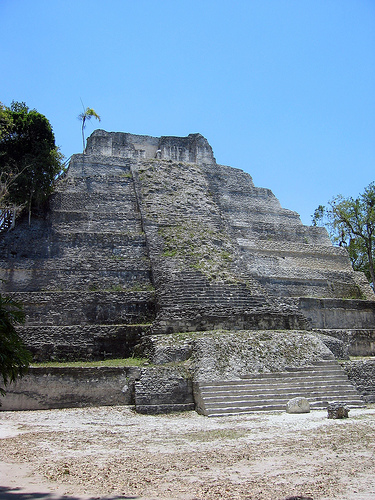
- Temple 216 in Yaxha

- Location within Guatemala
- Location: Petén, Guatemala
- Coordinates: 17.115°N 89.384°W
- Area: 371.6 km^{2} (91,800 acres)
- Established: 2003
- Visitors: 202 (in 1940)
- Governing body: private

Ramsar Wetland
- Official name: Parque Nacional Yaxhá-Nakum-Naranjo
- Designated: 2 February 2006
- Reference no.: 1599

The Cultural Triangle Yaxha-Nakum-Naranjo National Park (Triángulo Cultural in Spanish) is a multidisciplinary project involving archaeologists, architects, restaurateurs, and biologists. It is situated in Petén, Guatemala. The project does not only work in one archaeological site, but in a region of 1,200 square kilometres (460 mi^{2}) including three gigantic sites and 14 sub-centers – the most populated area of the Classic period of the Maya civilization.

== History ==
The project, founded in 1994, started with over 300 Guatemalan workers and 12 scientists. The first work carried out was at Topoxte, an island within the lake of Yaxha. Here you find the only exposed architecture of the Maya Postclassic period in the whole Petén Basin. One of the temples, so called Temple C, was near to its collapse. That’s why the team restored it during the first two years. Today the island is one of the principal points of interest in the Petén and the cooperative of the project brings many tourists by boat to the island.

Yaxha, a Mayan city constructed at the shore of the lake with the same name is the biggest site in the area. Between 1994 and 2008 a multitude of important buildings was restored here. The urban organization around the enormous sacred roads (sacbes) is understandable and visible again; now it’s possible to observe a variety of temples, palaces, ball-courts and observatories in state of restoration and from the top of Temple 216 one can admire a view over the whole site, the rainforest and the lake.

In 1997 the work was amplified to the site of Nakum. This site, 18 km (11 mi) north of Yaxha, is a Mayan oasis within the dense rainforest. Furthermore it’s the site with the highest number of restored buildings after Tikal. The architecture shows strong influence from Tikal as the pyramids are very steep carrying temples and roofcombs.

As the archaeological work and the restoration at Topoxte, Yaxha and Nakum have nearly finished, in January 2009 most of the workers have been moved to the site of Naranjo. This site will be the centre of future investigation to find new information about the Cultural Heritage of the Mayans and to prepare another important site for tourism.

== Sources ==
- Dieter Richter, collaborator of The Cultural Triangle
- Café Arqueológico Yaxhá, Flores, Guatemala
