= Sexual violence in Haiti =

Sexual violence in Haiti is a common phenomenon today, making it a public health problem. Being raped is considered shameful in Haitian society, and victims may find themselves abandoned by loved ones or with reduced marriageability. Until 2005, rape was not legally considered a serious crime and a rapist could avoid jail by marrying their victim. Reporting a rape to police in Haiti is a difficult and convoluted process, a factor that contributes to underreporting and difficulty in obtaining accurate statistics about sexual violence. Few rapists face any punishment.

Sexual violence potentially augments the risk of HIV infection. A Ministry of Health (Haiti) study reported there was sub-optimal utilization of anti-HIV medications following sexual assault at the largest state hospital in Haiti, L'Hôpital de l'Université d'État d'Haiti. Study findings recommended the prioritization of funding and comprehensive interventions that align sexual violence, HIV and mental health to support the timely uptake to antiretroviral medications following sexual assault.

A UN Security Council study in 2006 reported 35,000 sexual assaults against women and girls between 2004 and 2006. The UN also reported that half of the women living in the capital city Port-au-Prince's slums had been raped. United Nations peacekeepers stationed in Haiti since 2004 have drawn widespread resentment after reports emerged of the soldiers raping Haitian civilians.

The devastating earthquake in 2010 caused over a million Haitians to move to refugee camps where conditions are dangerous and poor. A study by a human rights group found that 14% of Haitian households reported having at least one member suffered sexual violence within two years after the earthquake. In 2012, sexual assaults in Port-au-Prince were reported at a rate 20 times higher in the camps than elsewhere in Haiti.

A 2009 study reported that up to 225,000 Haitian children are forced to work as domestic servants, and are at grave risk of rape at the hands of their captors. The children, known as restaveks, are traded into other households by their families, exchanging the children's labor for upbringing. Two thirds of restaveks are female, and most of them come from very poor families and are given to better-off ones. Restaveks who are young and female are particularly likely to be victimized sexually. Female restaveks are sometimes referred to as "la pou sa" which translates to "here for this"—'this' being the sexual pleasure of the males of the family with whom they are staying.

== Social factors ==
Victim blaming is common in Haiti, which discourages people from reporting assaults against them. Rape victims and their families are stigmatized, and being the victim of a rape is considered shameful. Sometimes family and significant others abandon a victim. Women and girls who have been raped often try to keep the fact a secret since not being a virgin reduces their marriageability. This shame surrounding rape discourages reporting and contributes to the difficulty in garnering accurate statistics on sexual assaults.

Due to the entrenched attitudes about women in the society, law enforcement personnel such as police and judges frequently do not take violence against women and children seriously and do not make great effort to enforce laws against it.

Victims may contract HIV or other sexually transmitted infections or may become pregnant from rape and bear children, potentially an emotional and economic hardship.

Drug dealing and illicit arms trading are widespread in Haiti, which contribute to a rising rate of sexual violence including gang rapes.

== Law ==
Until 2005, rape was classified in Haitian law as a "crime against public morals", a lesser crime than assault. Prior to the implementation of the 2005 law, which was brought about after lobbying by survivors and the Haitian Ministry of Women's Affairs, rape per se had not been a punishable offense. A rapist could avoid jail time by agreeing to marry the victim or by paying her family. In addition to increasing legal penalties for rape, the 2005 law mandated that women who have been raped can receive treatment for it for free and no longer had to go only to the main state hospital but could seek it in any health facility. However, abortion is still illegal in Haiti, so those who become pregnant from rape have no legal recourse.

Many women who are raped fear reporting the crime because of potential reprisals from attackers, so finding accurate statistics on sexual violence is complicated. The legal procedure for reporting a sexual assault to police is convoluted and difficult, further diminishing the number of reports made. Critics of Haitian police have called their response to reported rapes inadequate.

== History ==
=== Spanish Hispaniola (1492–1625) ===
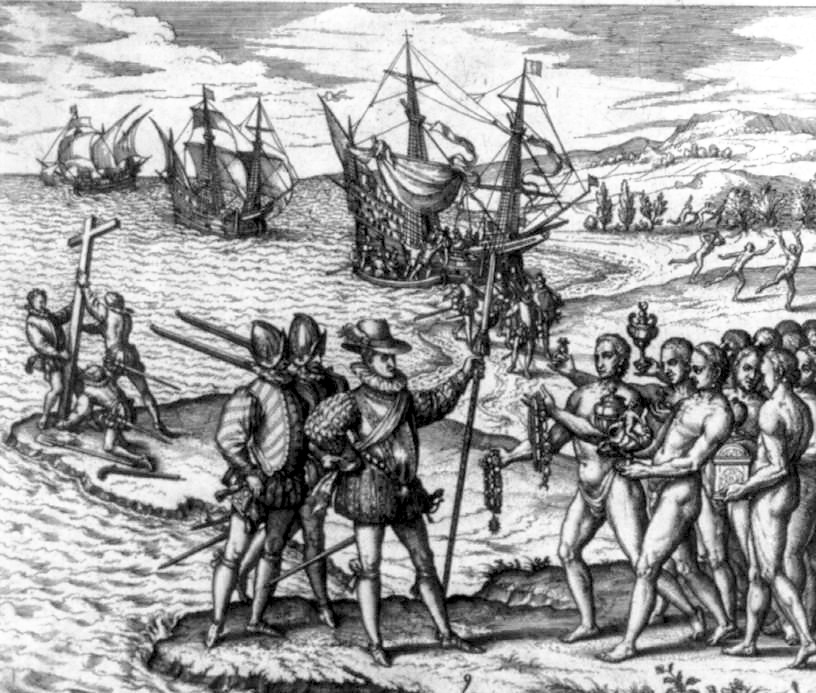
The natives of the island initially approached Columbus and his soldiers with friendliness and generosity.

Sexual violence on the part of Christopher Columbus's soldiers began almost immediately upon their landing on the island. When he established a fortress and left for Spain in 1493, Spanish soldiers he left behind sexually abused the native Taino women and girls. In some cases they held native women and girls as sex slaves. Spanish missionary Bartolomé de las Casas spoke out against the brutality of the Spaniards in a campaign against the enslavement of the Tainos. He quoted one Taino cacique (tribal chief) who said of the Spaniards, "They speak to us of an immortal soul and of their eternal rewards and punishments, and yet they rob our belongings, seduce our women, violate our daughters." In a 1500 letter Columbus wrote of the slave trade in Hispaniola, "…there are plenty of dealers who go about looking for girls; those from nine to ten are now in demand."

Among the things the Spanish sailors brought back to the old world was yaws, a bacterial disease that the Taino women carried and that was transmitted to the soldiers while raping the women. Syphilis in Europe may also have originated in the new world, and a number of Columbus' sailors brought that disease back from the New World as well.

Some women who became pregnant from rape by settlers took medicinal herbs to cause abortion.

=== French Saint-Domingue (1625–1789) ===
In the 18th century, Haiti was a profitable French colony named Saint-Domingue; its economy was based on plantations that grew sugar for export to Europe and slaves comprised a majority of the population. It was not legal for slaveholders to rape their slaves, but the laws against it were not enforced. Known as the most cruel in the world even for their time, Haitian slavers routinely tortured slaves, mutilating, burning, whipping, and raping them. Like other forms of torture, rape of slaves was commonplace. Sexual torture was also commonplace, including putting gunpowder in the anus and lighting it, and castration and other genital mutilation. Abortion and infanticide became means of resistance for slave women who bore children by whites.

Sex between white male slaveholders and black female slaves was abundant and long-lasting in Haiti in the French colonial period, and always carried with it the violence and coerciveness of the institution of slavery. At the time it was common for white slaveholders to father children with their slaves; typically these men would deny their paternity of these children but they would often free them from slavery and give them land. These mixed-race people were part of a class of Haitians who were referred to as Gens de couleur or "free people of color" who were legally given more privileges than blacks but fewer than whites. Free people of color were not legally entitled to defend their women against rape by whites. By the end of the 1700s there were as many mixed race people who resulted from unions between slaveholders and slaves as there were whites.

=== Revolutionary period (1789–1804) ===
In 1804, the revolutionary leader Jean-Jacques Dessalines led a campaign of massacres against the white people. In parallel to the killings, plundering and rape also occurred. Women and children were generally killed last. White women were "often raped or pushed into forced marriages under threat of death."

After the Haitian revolution former slaveholders circulated pamphlets decrying crimes including rape against whites by Haitians in an attempt to pressure their government to re-initiate military hostilities with Haiti. Such propaganda made a large impact in the US, where imagery like "white women being repeatedly raped on the corpses of their husbands and fathers" terrified slaveholders, who began to fear similar uprisings among their slaves.

Harlem Renaissance author Arna Bontemps wrote novels about the Haitian revolution depicting sexual violence as a means of expressing white dominance over slaves. In his 1939 novel Drums at Dusk, about the Haitian revolution, both black and white characters rape and are raped as a means of asserting the manhood and power of the rapist and denying it to the victim.

=== United States occupation (1915–1934) ===
From 1915 to 1934, the United States occupied Haiti, and rape and murder of Haitian civilians by US soldiers was commonplace. Both officers and enlisted men participated in the sexual violence, raping adult women and young girls, and sometimes holding women as sex slaves. The marines, who administered a group of Haitian gendarmes acting as police, were accused of widespread rapes of women and girls and of trying to use the gendarmes to find them women to use as concubines. Evidence exists that some military higher-ups knew of the sexual violence but did little to punish it, condoning it by denying it, questioning the virtue of Haitian women, and suggesting that raped women had actually consented. A victim blaming mentality existed among the occupiers, who thought of Haitian women as being "of easy virtue"—a mentality which served to justify and even deny the existence of sexual violence.

Resentment grew on the part of Haitians and led to conflict with the occupiers. African-Americans also raised outcry about the marines' sexual violence; one reverend said, "in one night alone in … Port-au-Prince nine little girls from 8 to 12 years old died from the raping of American soldiers." In his 1920 campaign for presidency, Warren G. Harding criticized incumbent Woodrow Wilson, referring to the occupation as the "Rape of Haiti"; however after he won the election he continued the occupation in his own presidency.

=== François Duvalier (1957–1971) ===
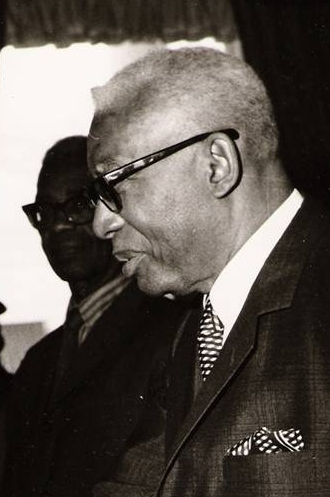
President François "Papa Doc" Duvalier used rape as a weapon against his political opposition.

François "Papa Doc" Duvalier was the President of Haiti from 1957 until his death in 1971. Overseeing a reign of state terrorism, Duvalier would kill large numbers of political enemies, imprison them arbitrarily, and use gang rape as a means of control. Although both men and women were targeted for violence, women in particular were targeted for rape. In some cases Duvalier himself supervised gang rapes and gave orders to the soldiers performing them, in others he had surrogates perform them in his absence. Duvalier employed an organization of ex-soldiers, criminals, and other loyalists to his regime called Tontons Macoutes. The term is Kreyòl for "Uncle Knapsack", a reference to the bogeyman of Haitian legend who would catch naughty children and kidnap them in his knapsack. Duvalier used the reference to voodoo, as well as violence such as rape and murder by the Tontons Macoutes, to instill fear and repress opposition. The Tontons Macoutes remained active even after the presidency of Papa Doc Duvalier's son Baby Doc ended in 1986.

=== Jean-Claude Duvalier (1971–1986) ===
Jean-Claude (Baby Doc) Duvalier became President of Haiti at age 19 upon his father's death in 1971. According to human rights groups Duvalier used widespread violence, including rape, as a means of suppressing opposition to his regime. Duvalier's presidency lasted until a popular uprising overthrew him in 1986. After the uprising he spent 25 years in France, and when he returned to Haiti he was arrested on charges of human rights abuses including rape; however a judge ruled that the statute of limitations had expired on these crimes.

The Duvalier regimes would later become inspiration for dictator Raoul Cédras, who modeled the use of violence and torture in his regimes after that used by the Duvaliers, but used rape even more widely.

The Duvalier regime revealed an intersection between gender, power, and politics in Haiti. Gender relations began to take shape in Haiti during the Duvalier regime which lasted from the late 1950s to the mid 1980s. This regime was based on authoritarianism and oppression. In the 1980s, Haitian society shifted due to the emergence of a new wave of feminism. This new feminism was different because it took a broader approach, using the experiences of women across the Caribbean and Latin America. This new feminism challenged the patriarchal policies and practices in the Duvalier regime. The new feminism challenged traditional gender roles and sought to place women rights and empowerment at the forefront. This new feminist movement in Haiti sought to challenge gender inequality and tackle other forms of oppression against women; including race and class

=== Raoul Cédras (1991–1994) ===
In 1991 Haiti's democratically elected president Jean Bertrand Aristide was ousted in a military coup led by General Raoul Cédras. Cédras was in turn removed by a US occupation in 1994 and Aristide was returned to power. During the Cédras regime rape became a systematic weapon of terror to quell resistance from the populace of Haiti, a majority of which supported the ousted Aristide and was against Cédras. Men and women alike were targeted for killings, torture, and disappearances, but women in particular were targeted for sexual violence based on their real or supposed political beliefs.

Women who opposed Cédras, or whose male relatives did, were systematically targeted for rape. Women would be assaulted on the streets, while being detained by authorities, or during paramilitary or police raids on their houses. Both soldiers and civilians sympathetic with them attacked women, targeting women's and human rights organizations as well as individuals. The regime aimed to break down the new women's rights movement which had been forming for 20 years, and which had been instrumental in bringing Aristide to power in 1990. Going into hiding or escaping the island was more difficult for women with children than it was for men who were targeted for violence.

In 1994, the US military entered Haiti and the US made a deal whereby Cédras would leave power, but Haitian military personnel who had committed human rights abuses, including rape and murder, under him would not be prosecuted. After the end of the Cédras regime, a Haitian human rights commission found that thousands of rapes had been reported during the Cédras regime, and thousands more were likely not reported. In early 1994, a US Embassy representative estimated that a quarter of Haitians seeking political asylum in the US out of fear for their safety were women, and one in 20 of those had suffered politically motivated rape. An April 1994 cable leaked from the US Embassy outraged women's rights advocates because it dismissed Haitian exiles' allegations of rape by security forces as lies (which human rights groups denied).

Aristide was returned to power, but another coup in 2004 saw his exit a second time.

== 2010 earthquake and aftermath ==
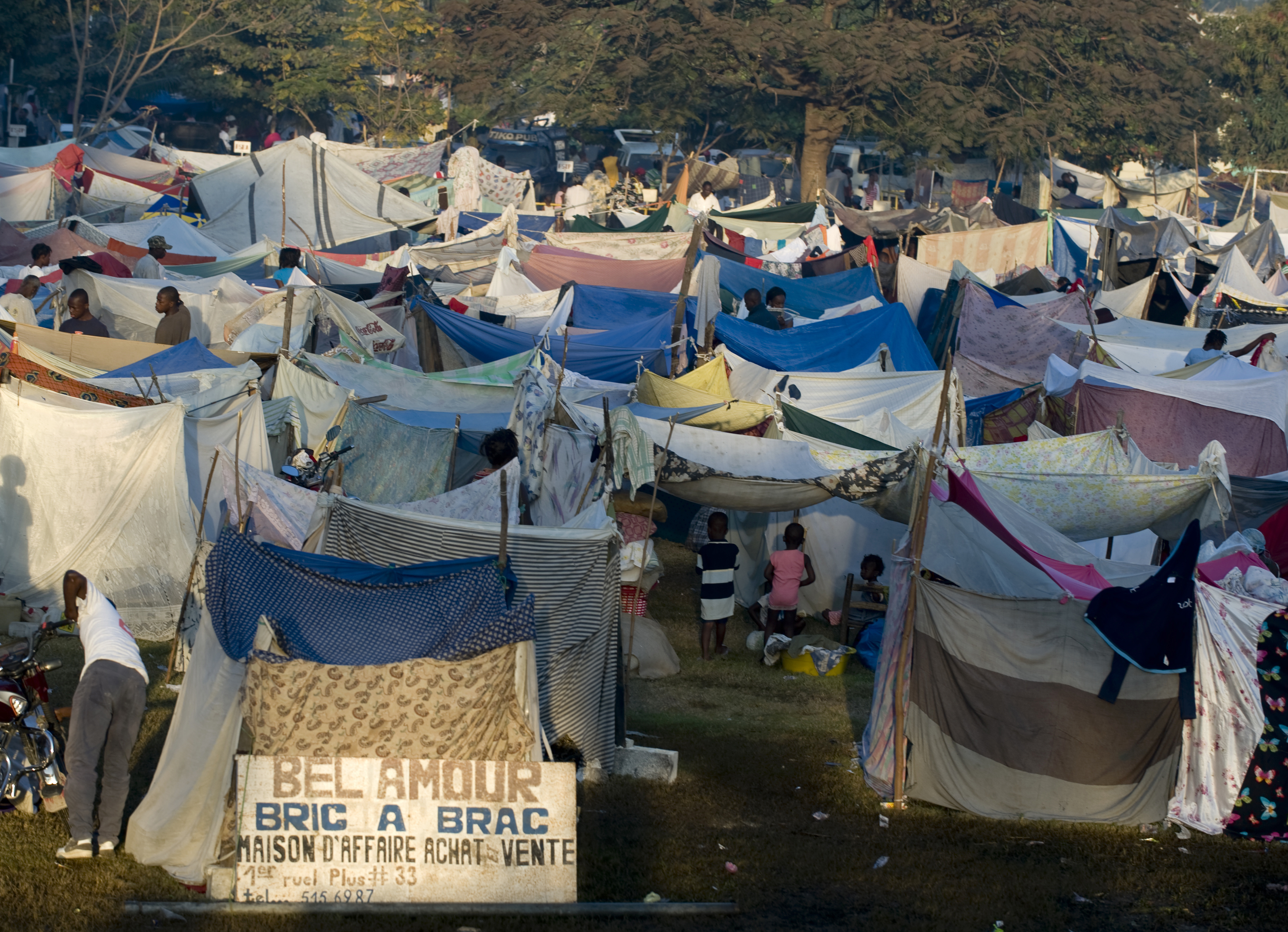
After the 2010 earthquake, more than a million people moved into tent cities rife with violence.

Over a million people made homeless in the 2010 earthquake in Haiti moved into refugee camps that offered little food, work, or safety. The UN reported that as of October 2012 about 370,000 people were still in the camps and facing poor and insecure living conditions. The earthquake directly preceded a rapid increase in the numbers of sexual violence in Haiti.

Factors contributing to vulnerability after the earthquake include homelessness and losing the protection afforded by a house; losing family members who might have provided protection; and increases in levels of violence due to the stress of living in substandard conditions; and lack of legal recourse to prosecute rapists. The tent cities have little privacy, lighting, or policing.

Young children are also victimized. Women who need to leave their children in search of work, food, or water sometimes have no option but to leave them alone or with strangers; sometimes these children are sexually abused. Human rights group Amnesty International reports that men roam the camps in groups looking for victims, targeting young girls without the protection afforded by schools and safe play areas.

Police stations and courts were destroyed in the earthquake, making access to protection and prosecution of offenders more difficult, and human rights groups have accused the Haitian government of having an insufficient response to sexual violence. The number of sexual abusers who are prosecuted is very small, a fact which has led to more rapes as rapists realize they are unlikely to face consequences.

In October 2010 from human rights group Refugees International reported that sexual violence was on the rise in the refugee camps because UN forces were providing insufficient security. Although the number of rapes is thought by some to be increasing since the earthquake, gathering accurate statistics is difficult. The Port-au-Prince women's group who have been gathering statistics on rape before and after the earthquake didn't see an increase in rape reports in 2010 and after, as opposed to domestic violence reports who were on the rise. A study by a human rights group found that 14% of Haitian households reported having at least one member suffered sexual violence between the January 2010 earthquake and January 2012. In 2012, sexual assaults in Port-au-Prince were reported at a rate 20 times higher in the camps than elsewhere in Haiti.

In some countries victims of pregnancy from rape have access to safe and legal abortions, but not in Haiti. In the aftermath of the 2010 earthquake, not only did sexual violence rise but the birth rate in the camps also spiked dramatically, because many women who became pregnant after being raped had no way to treat their pregnancy, so were forced to give birth. Those who have money can go to a doctor and get safe abortions done secretly, but those who don't turn to medication that has other purposes - for example many women used anti-ulcer medication which can lead to hemorrhaging, infection, and other complications.

Gender, race, and class position play a crucial role in the vulnerability and marginalization of Haitian women. The aftermath of the 2010 earthquake that left Haiti in shambles and completely unstable across the board. The earthquake only exacerbated the already existing structural inequalities within Haitian society. Because of the earthquake, many Haitian women were forced to live in overcrowded and often unsafe living conditions; which made them more susceptible to sexual violence in displacement camps. Women faced many barriers when seeking aid and resources because of patriarchal attitudes and because of poor practices within the organizations. Structural violence (social, economic, and political) contributes to the vulnerability and marginalization of women in Haitian society which increases their exposure to sexual violence. Understanding structural violence is crucial for creating a more just and safe environment for women in Haiti.

=== Response efforts ===
Human rights groups have begun holding self-defense classes and issuing women whistles to provide an easy and loud way to call for help in camps. Donations from abroad have helped to fund better lighting in the camps and safety trainings for women, and women in the camps have organized watch groups to ensure each other's security. Grassroots organizations have set up a call center and an emergency response system for sexual violence.

A group of women raped during Cédras's rise to power formed a group to help women victims of rape in Haiti called FAVILEK, which in Creole stands for "Women Victims Get Up Stand Up". People from FAVILEK and other women's rights organizations are living in the camps and organizing to help women, setting up nighttime escorts and security patrols—sometimes at the risk of their own safety due to reprisals by attackers.

Women’s organizations in Haiti play a crucial role in providing support for victims and survivors of sexual violence. These organizations help Haitian women to advocate for policy changes within the Haitian government to be in favor of victims and survivors instead of the perpetuators. These organizations provide a safe space for women to share their experiences and feel a sense of community amongst women who share similar experiences. The sense of community evoked from these organizations aids in the overcoming of isolation and shame that many Haitian women feel as a result of how Haitian society views sexual violence against women.

Women in Haiti who have been victims of sexual violence can also be seen as survivors and can make change within their communities. By sharing their experiences and advocating for policy changes, they are able to challenge and contest the norms that contribute to sexual violence in Haiti and push other women to follow in their footsteps for a more safe and equitable society.

== Human trafficking ==
Poverty is extreme in Haiti, with 78% of the population surviving on less than $2 a day—a situation which sets the stage for prostitution, human trafficking, and mass violence. Both national and international crime rings are involved in human trafficking in Haiti. Adults and children are trafficked through, into, and out of Haiti for enslavement including prostitution. Common destinations for Haitians forced into sex trafficking include other parts of the Caribbean, the US, countries in South America, and the bordering Dominican Republic.

Haitian children are trafficked into the Dominican Republic for use as slaves in work including child prostitution; they are sometimes kidnapped, or their families may be swindled into handing them over to traffickers. Haitian children may also be used in sex tourism inside Haiti, forced into prostitution for foreigners. Dominican women have also reportedly been trafficked into Haiti for forced prostitution.

It is rare for human traffickers to be prosecuted in Haiti because the country does not have laws specifically banning the practice, and those laws that could be used against traffickers go unenforced. Efforts to prevent and investigate human trafficking and to protect victims are primarily undertaken by international and nonprofit organizations, not the Haitian government. The UN program UNICEF has funded the Brigade de Protection des Mineurs to find and protect children particularly vulnerable to trafficking.

International groups reported an increase in trafficking of children out of Haiti immediately after the 2010 earthquake, since the chaos and the aid effort made it easier for traffickers to take children out of the country. Government and international officials, busy dealing with the destruction of their infrastructure, were not in a position to protect children, some of whom had lost their families.

=== Intimate Partner Violence in Haiti ===
Over a third of women in haiti have experienced sexual violence from an intimate partner. There are social and cultural factors that influence intimate partner violence. Traditional gender relations within Haitian society have given men positions of power and control over women; which has normalized the amount of violence against them. Poverty, lack of access to quality education, and lack of access to healthcare has also contributed to a society where abuse occurs frequently but is not addressed. Sexual violence is usually used as a way for men to assert power and dominance over women. Men who may feel threatened by their partner’s independence or success are more likely to use sexual violence to maintain control to feel superior. Because of conditioned gender roles and norms in Haitian society, most men believe that they should be in control of their partners to display their masculinity.

=== Restaveks ===
A 2009 study reported that up to 225,000 Haitian children are forced to work as domestic servants, and are at grave risk of rape at the hands of their captors. The children, known as restaveks, are traded into other households by their families, exchanging the children's labor for upbringing. A 2012 report placed the number of restaveks in Haiti at between 150,000 and 500,000. Two thirds of restaveks are female, and most of them come from very poor families and are given to better-off ones.

Restaveks who are young and female are particularly likely to be victimized sexually. Female restaveks are sometimes referred to as "la pou sa" which translates to "there for that"—'that' being the sexual pleasure of the males of the family with whom they are staying. Restaveks who become pregnant are often thrown out onto the street. Those who are thrown out or who run away are at risk of becoming homeless or being forced into prostitution.

== UN peacekeepers ==
In 2004 the ouster of then-president Aristide led the United Nations to establish UN peacekeeping forces in Haiti. As of 2006 there were about 9000 UN peacekeepers in Haiti. Reports have emerged that some of the peacekeepers, there to provide security and humanitarian aid, have raped Haitian civilians. The UN is not able to discipline soldiers itself; rather, they are sent back to their home countries, and it is difficult for the UN to follow up to determine what if any punishment they received.

In November 2007, members of the Sri Lankan Army peacekeeping mission in Haiti were accused by the UN of sexual misconduct and sexual abuse of minors. The UN released a report accusing the Sri Lankan contingent of building a brothel in Martissant, Port-au-Prince charging them with systematic sexual exploitation and sexual abuse of minors, prostitution and rape. "In exchange for sex, the children received small amounts of money, food, and sometimes mobile phones,” reported the OIOS, the UN's investigative arm. Officials in Haiti have said that UN peacekeeping soldiers from Sri Lanka who had been accused of sex crimes in 2007 had even raped children as young as 7 years old.

After inquiry into the case the UN Office of Internal Oversight Services (OIOS) has concluded, "acts of sexual exploitation and abuse (against children) were frequent and occurred usually at night, and at virtually every location where the contingent personnel were deployed." The OIOS said charges should include statutory rape "because it involves children under 18 years of age". UN spokeswoman Michele Montas said: "The United Nations and the Sri Lankan government deeply regret any sexual exploitation and abuse that has occurred."

Noted Haitian female activist Ezhili Danto alleges:

If only a dozen UN peacekeepers were punished for sexual abuse and rape, then that means, for instance, most of the 114 Sri Lankan soldiers deported back to Sri Lanka from Haiti in 2007 for sexual abuse and rape in Haiti did not get punished.

In March 2013, a fresh batch of 400 soldiers from the Sri Lankan Army's Sinha Regiment left for Haiti as part of the UN Peacekeeping mission.

One man says he was raped by six Uruguayan UN peacekeepers on a Port-Salut UN base—video of the event taken by one of the soldiers was circulated widely in the town, sparking outrage. The Uruguayan military prosecuted the soldiers on charges of allowing a civilian onto the base and shirking their duties, and the men also face charges of rape in civilian court. The soldiers' commanding officer was fired as a result of the incident. In September 2011, the president of Uruguay wrote a letter of to the president of Haiti apologizing for the rape.

In March 2012, two UN soldiers from Pakistan were tried in a Pakistani military tribunal in Haiti for the January 2012 rape of a 14-year-old boy; they were each sentenced to one year in prison.

== See also ==
- Crime in Haiti
- Human rights in Haiti
- Poverty in Haiti
- Social class in Haiti
- Structural violence in Haiti
- Women's rights in Haiti

== Bibliography ==
- Abbott, Elizabeth (21 July 2011). Haiti: A Shattered Nation. Penguin. ISBN 978-1-4683-0160-1.
- Abbot, Elizabeth (1 April 2010). Sugar: A Bitterweet History. Penguin. ISBN 978-1-59020-772-7.
- Accilien, Cécile; Adams, Jessica; Méléance, Elmide; Ulrick Jean-Pierre (2006). Revolutionary Freedoms: A History of Survival, Strength and Imagination in Haiti. Educa Vision Inc. ISBN 978-1-58432-293-1.
- Adamson, Erin M. (2007). MUDHA: History of Haitian and Dominican-Haitian Women's Organizing in the Dominican Republic. ISBN 978-0-549-13413-8.
- Bond, George C. (1994). Social Construction of the Past: Representation As Power. Psychology Press. ISBN 978-0-415-09045-2.
- Dubois, Laurent (2012). Haiti: The Aftershocks of History. New York, NY: Metropolitan Books.
- Ferguson, James (1988). Papa Doc, Baby Doc: Haiti and the Duvaliers. John Wiley & Sons, Limited. ISBN 978-0-631-16579-8.
- Filan, Kenaz (2010). The Haitian Vodou Handbook: Protocols for Riding with the Lwa. Inner Traditions / Bear & Co. ISBN 978-1-59477-995-4.
- Geggus, David Patrick; Fiering, Norman (2009). The World of the Haitian Revolution. Indiana University Press. ISBN 978-0-253-22017-2.
- Girard, Philippe (14 September 2010). Haiti: The Tumultuous History – From Pearl of the Caribbean to Broken Nation. Macmillan. ISBN 978-0-230-11290-2.
- Girard, Philippe R. (2011). The Slaves Who Defeated Napoleon: Toussaint Louverture and the Haitian War of Independence 1801–1804. Tuscaloosa, Alabama: The University of Alabama Press. ISBN 978-0-8173-1732-4.
- Hunter, Susan (2003). Who Cares?: AIDS in Africa. Palgrave Macmillan. ISBN 978-1-4039-3615-8.
- James, Erica Caple (14 May 2010). Democratic Insecurities: Violence, Trauma, and Intervention in Haiti. University of California Press. ISBN 978-0-520-26053-5.
- Kumar, Anuradha (1 January 2002). Human Rights: Global Perspectives. New Delhi: Sarup & Sons. ISBN 978-81-7625-322-2.
- Léger, Jacques Nicolas (1907). Haiti, Her History and Her Detractors. Neale Publishing Company. wikisource
- Loewen, James W. (2008). Lies My Teacher Told Me: Everything Your American History Textbook Got Wrong. The New Press. ISBN 978-1-59558-326-0.
- Meltzer, Milton (1971). Slavery: A World History. Da Capo Press. ISBN 978-0-306-80536-3.
- Paterson, Thomas; Clifford, J. Garry; Maddock, Shane J.; Deborah Kisatsky, Kenneth J. Hagan (27 March 2009). American Foreign Relations: A History, Volume 2: Since 1895. Cengage Learning. ISBN 978-0-547-22569-2.
- Pezzullo, Ralph (2006). Plunging Into Haiti: Clinton, Aristide, and the Defeat of Diplomacy. Univ. Press of Mississippi. ISBN 978-1-60473-534-5.
- Renda, Mary A. (1 December 2001). Taking Haiti: Military Occupation and the Culture of U.S. Imperialism, 1915-1940. University of North Carolina Press. ISBN 978-0-8078-6218-6.
- Rodriguez, J.P. (2007). Encyclopedia of Slave Resistance and Rebellion. Greenwood Publishing Group. ISBN 978-0-313-33272-2.
- Roht-Arriaza, Naomi (31 May 1995). Impunity and Human Rights in International Law and Practice. Oxford University Press. ISBN 978-0-19-535971-8.
- Sommerfelt, Tone; Pederson, Jon (22 April 2011). "Child labor in Haiti". In Hindman, Hugh D (ed.). The World of Child Labor: An Historical and Regional Survey. M.E. Sharpe. ISBN 978-0-7656-2647-9.
- Woertendyke, Gretchen Judith (2007). Specters of Haiti: Race, Fear, and the American Gothic, 1789–1855. ISBN 978-0-549-88223-7.
