= Nan Dupin =

- Village
- Location in Haiti
- Coordinates: 18.1202189°N 73.9402413°W
- Country: Haiti
- Department: Sud
- Arrondissement: Port-Salut
- Elevation: 69 m (226 ft)

Nan Dupin is a village in the Port-Salut commune in the Port-Salut Arrondissement, in the Sud department of Haiti.

== See also ==
- Berger
- Ca Goulmie
- Carpentier
- Duclere
- Laroux
- Lebon
- Nan Bois
- Port-Salut
- Praslin
- Trouilla Verdun
