= Carpentier, Haiti =

Carpentier
- Village
- Location in Haiti
- Coordinates: 18.1319224°N 73.9505094°W
- Country: Haiti
- Department: Sud
- Arrondissement: Port-Salut
- Elevation: 9 m (30 ft)

Carpentier (French pronunciation: [kaʁpɑ̃tje]) is a village located in the Port-Salut commune within the Port-Salut Arrondissement, situated in the Sud department of Haiti.

== See also ==
- Berger
- Ca Goulmie
- Duclere
- Laroux
- Lebon
- Nan Bois
- Nan Dupin
- Port-Salut
- Praslin
- Trouilla Verdun
