= Praslin, Haiti =

Praslin
- Village
- Location in Haiti
- Coordinates: 18.1619595°N 73.902331°W
- Country: Haiti
- Department: Sud
- Arrondissement: Port-Salut
- Elevation: 189 m (620 ft)

Praslin is a village in the Torbeck commune of the Port-Salut Arrondissement, in the Sud department of Haiti.

== See also ==
- Berger
- Ca Goulmie
- Carpentier
- Duclere
- Laroux
- Lebon
- Nan Bois
- Nan Dupin
- Port-Salut
- Trouilla Verdun
