= Nan Bois =

- Village
- Location in Haiti
- Coordinates: 18°08′30″N 73°56′10″W
- Country: Haiti
- Department: Sud
- Arrondissement: Port-Salut
- Elevation: 144 m (472 ft)

Nan Bois is a rural settlement in the Port-Salut commune of the Port-Salut Arrondissement, in the Sud department of Haiti.

== See also ==
- Berger
- Ca Goulmie
- Carpentier
- Duclere
- Laroux
- Lebon
- Nan Dupin
- Port-Salut
- Praslin
- Trouilla Verdun
