= Duclere, Haiti =

Duclere
- Village
- Location in Haiti
- Coordinates: 18.1835395°N 73.9303118°W
- Country: Haiti
- Department: Sud
- Arrondissement: Port-Salut
- Elevation: 332 m (1,089 ft)

Duclere is a village in the Port-Salut commune of the Port-Salut Arrondissement, in the Sud department of Haiti.

== See also ==
- Berger
- Ca Goulmie
- Carpentier
- Laroux
- Lebon
- Nan Bois
- Nan Dupin
- Port-Salut
- Praslin
- Trouilla Verdun
