= Ca Goulmie =

- Village
- Location in Haiti
- Coordinates: 18.218121°N 73.9781409°W
- Country: Haiti
- Department: Sud
- Arrondissement: Port-Salut
- Elevation: 246 m (807 ft)

Ca Goulmie is a village in the Port-Salut commune in the Port-Salut Arrondissement, in the Sud department of Haiti.

== See also ==
- Berger
- Carpentier
- Duclere
- Laroux
- Lebon
- Nan Bois
- Nan Dupin
- Port-Salut
- Praslin
- Trouilla Verdun
