= Chiedent =

- Village
- Location in Haiti
- Coordinates: 18.0255319°N 73.882655°W
- Country: Haiti
- Department: Sud
- Arrondissement: Port-Salut
- Elevation: 10 m (33 ft)

Chiedent is a village in the Saint-Jean-du-Sud commune in the Port-Salut Arrondissement, in the Sud department of Haiti.

== See also ==
- Saint-Jean-du-Sud, for a list of other settlements in the commune.
