= Scipion, Sud =

Scipion
- Village
- Location in Haiti
- Coordinates: 18.0727057°N 73.9131617°W
- Country: Haiti
- department: Sud
- Arrondissement: Port-Salut
- Elevation: 16 m (52 ft)

Scipion (French pronunciation: [sipjɔ̃]) is a village in the Arniquet commune of the Port-Salut Arrondissement, in the Sud department of Haiti.

== See also ==
- Arniquet, for a list of other settlements in the commune.
