= Trou Palouse =

- Village
- Location in Haiti
- Coordinates: 18.0481335°N 73.8093173°W
- Country: Haiti
- Department: Sud
- Arrondissement: Port-Salut
- Elevation: 55 m (180 ft)

Trou Palouse (French pronunciation: [tʁu paluz]) is a village in the Saint-Jean-du-Sud commune of the Port-Salut Arrondissement, in the Sud department of Haiti.

== See also ==
- Saint-Jean-du-Sud, for a list of other settlements in the commune.
