= Martin, Haiti =

Martin
- Village
- Location in Haiti
- Coordinates: 18.0234811°N 73.8100309°W
- Country: Haiti
- Department: Sud
- Arrondissement: Port-Salut
- Elevation: 13 m (43 ft)

Martin (French pronunciation: [maʁtɛ̃]) is a village in the Saint-Jean-du-Sud commune of the Port-Salut Arrondissement, in the Sud department of Haiti.

== See also ==
- Saint-Jean-du-Sud, for a list of other settlements in the commune.
