= Saint-Jean, Haiti =

Saint-Jean
- Town
- Location in Haiti
- Coordinates: 18.0752507°N 73.8150278°W
- Country: Haiti
- Department: Sud
- Arrondissement: Port-Salut

Area
  - Total: 0.3 km^{2} (0.12 sq mi)
- Elevation: 14 m (46 ft)

Population (2009)
  - Total: 939
  - Density: 3,130/km^{2} (8,100/sq mi)

Saint-Jean (French pronunciation: [sɛ̃ ʒɑ̃]) is a town in the Saint-Jean-du-Sud commune of the Port-Salut Arrondissement, in the Sud department of Haiti. In 2009, it had 939 inhabitants.

== See also ==
- Saint-Jean-du-Sud, for a list of other settlements in the commune.
