= Gaspard, Haiti =

Gaspard
- Village
- Location in Haiti
- Coordinates: 18.1560264°N 73.9337396°W
- Country: Haiti
- Department: Sud
- Arrondissement: Port-Salut
- Elevation: 30 m (98 ft)

Gaspard (French pronunciation: [ɡaspaʁ]) is a village in the Saint-Jean-du-Sud commune of the Port-Salut Arrondissement, in the Sud department of Haiti.

== See also ==
- Saint-Jean-du-Sud, for a list of other settlements in the municipality.
