= Bileux =

- Village
- Location in Haiti
- Coordinates: 18.1206472°N 73.8955504°W
- Country: Haiti
- Department: Sud
- Arrondissement: Port-Salut
- Elevation: 218 m (715 ft)

Bileux (French pronunciation: [bilø]) is a village in the Arniquet commune in the Port-Salut Arrondissement, in the Sud department of Haiti.

== See also ==
- Arniquet, for a list of other settlements in the commune.
