= Bel Anse =

- Rural settlement
- Location in Haiti
- Coordinates: 18.00850365°N 73.848994°W
- Country: Haiti
- Department: Sud
- Arrondissement: Port-Salut
- Elevation: 94 m (308 ft)

Bel Anse is a rural settlement in the Saint-Jean-du-Sud commune in the Port-Salut Arrondissement, in the Sud department of Haiti.

== See also ==
- Saint-Jean-du-Sud, for a list of other settlements in the commune.
