= Structural violence in Haiti =

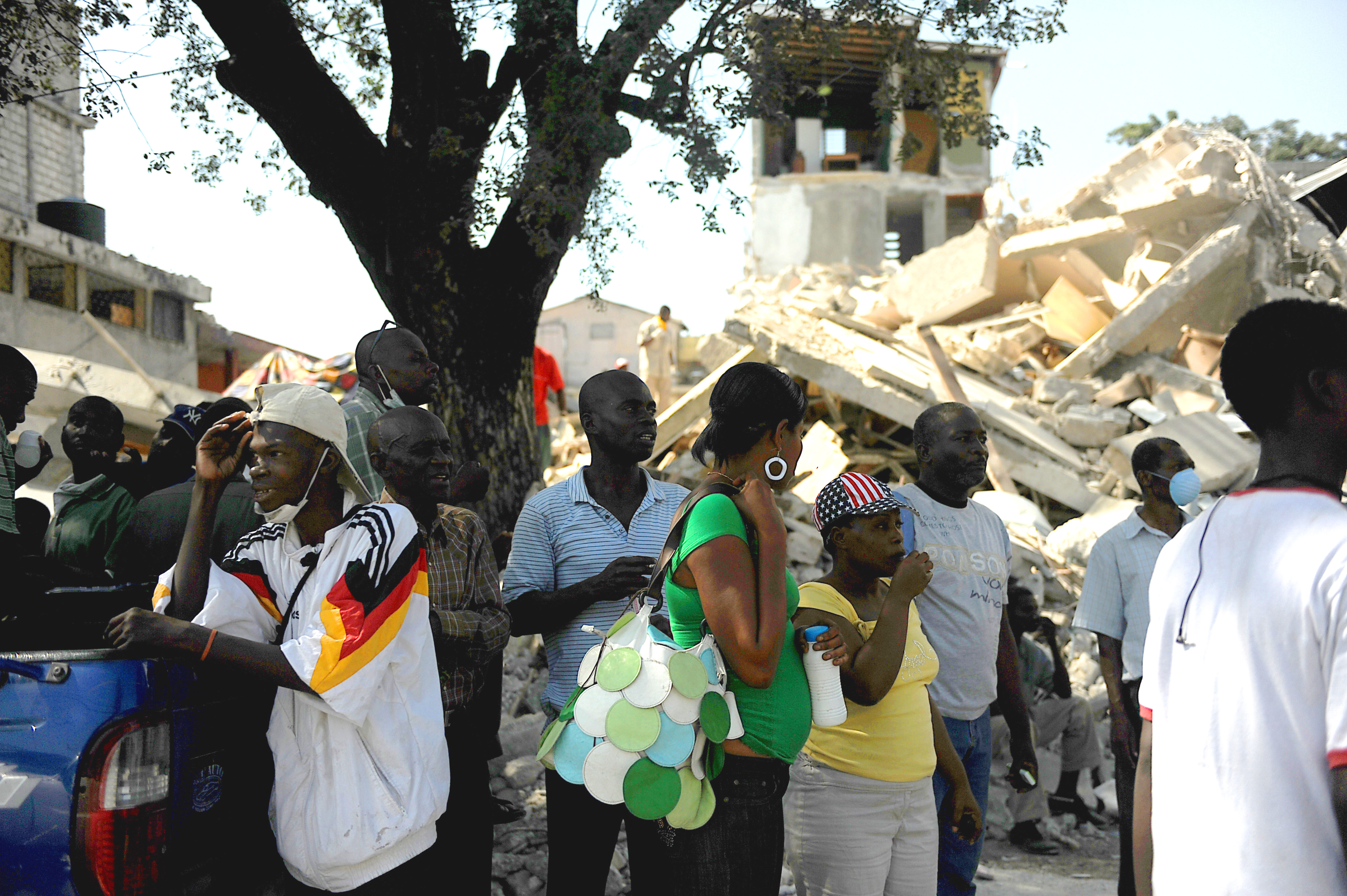
Haitians walk by damaged buildings in downtown Port-au-Prince, Haiti, after the earthquake in 2010.

Haiti is impacted by structural violence, a form of dysfunction where social structures prevent certain groups of people from having access to basic human rights, like education and healthcare. This has resulted from decades of political instability and social unrest. Additionally, Haitians are financially impoverished and within Haiti, there exist social inequalities. In 2012, 58.5% of its population was below its poverty line. Educational standards within the nation are low, where its literacy rate is about 60.7%, below the 84.1% global average. Haiti is also globally ranked lower than most other nations in various measurements of health outcomes. Such health outcomes include life expectancy, mortality rates, and disease levels. While there has been some international assistance, there are insufficient supportive infrastructures in place within the country to provide resources and opportunities for Haitians who are trying to attain a higher quality of life. Causes that have resulted in higher levels of structural violence within Haiti include political instability and corruption, as well as the impact of post-colonialism, which has established a caste-based class system within Haiti.

== Definition of structural violence ==
As defined by Medical Anthropologist Dr. Paul Farmer, structural violence is the way by which social arrangements are constructed to put specific members of a population in harm's way. According to Dr. Farmer, social inequalities are at the heart of structural violence, where the prevailing societal framework imposes invisible barriers that perpetuate the suffering of certain groups of people. The term structural violence was first coined by Johan Galtung, the founder of peace and conflict studies, in 1969. The term further gained exposure when it was used by Latin American liberation theologians. These social arrangements are termed structural as they are embedded into the cultural, political and economic realms of society. The term violence highlights the fact that these structures cause injury or inequality to certain groups of peoples and constrain individual agency in the society in which they operate. While structural violence exists in other parts of the world, its effects are more readily identified within Haiti.

== Compounding factors ==
While the negative effects of structural violence affects almost everyone in the nation of Haiti, there are a number of social factors that render certain demographics of the population to experience a more severe form of human suffering. These include gender, ethnicity and socioeconomic status.

=== Gender ===
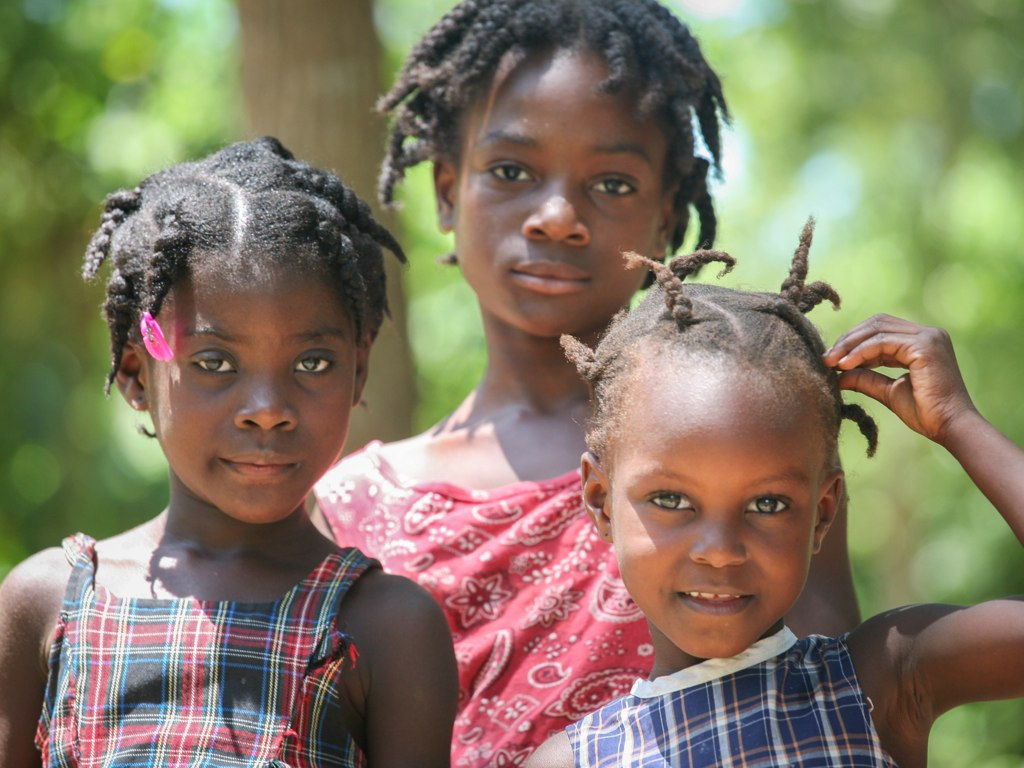
Haitian girls

While structural violence impacts Haiti as a whole, due to the presence of gender inequality, women within Haiti tend to be more heavily impacted by structural violence than men. In the 2004 United Nations Development Fund for Women report, Haitian women were found to remain as the target of oppression, independent of any political change within the nation. Among the 43% of households which are headed by women, more than 80% are reported to be living in poverty. Moreover, according to the 2000 UN Special Rapporteur on Violence against Women, a report on Haiti noted that structural gender disparities have made Haitian women disproportionately susceptible to physical violence, but also excluded from various forms of protection. For example, spousal rape is not regarded as a crime under Haiti's judicial system. Other forms of legal discrimination against women and girls include differentiated wage levels, as well as unequal penalties for both adultery and divorce.

=== Race / ethnicity ===
Racial or ethnic differentiation has been well acknowledged as a means of depriving certain racial or ethnic groups of basic human rights, or from receiving the same quality of resources as others. In Haiti's context, such social discrimination exists predominantly from two areas: Antihaitianismo, which is the racial bias against Haitians and descendants of Haitians by Dominicans, and remnants of the Haitian colonial hierarchy via caste discrimination. While Haitian mulattoes make up 5% of the Haitian population, they are regarded as the upper class and control approximately 44% of the national income.

=== Socioeconomic status ===
The Human Suffering Index (HSI), which examines measures of human welfare ranging from life expectancy to political freedom, listed Haiti to be one of the 27 of 141 countries characterized by "extreme human suffering". Coming from a lower socioeconomic background can render individuals and groups to be more vulnerable to "extreme human suffering". This is because economic and political structural barriers tend to have a greater impact on those who are lower down on the social order, or are affected by poverty. This stems from the fact that those who are of lower classes often have limited access to resources or do not share the quality of resources that those of higher socio-economic classes have access to. UNICEF statistics show that while less than 10% of births among the poorest 20% in Haiti had a skilled attendant present, 78.1% of all births had a skilled attendant present for the richest 20%. Underweight prevalence among the poorest 20% is 4.7 times greater than that of the richest 20%. Economically, the poorest 40% make up 8% of the nation's total household income, while the richest 20% make up 63%.

== Impacts of structural violence ==
=== Poverty ===
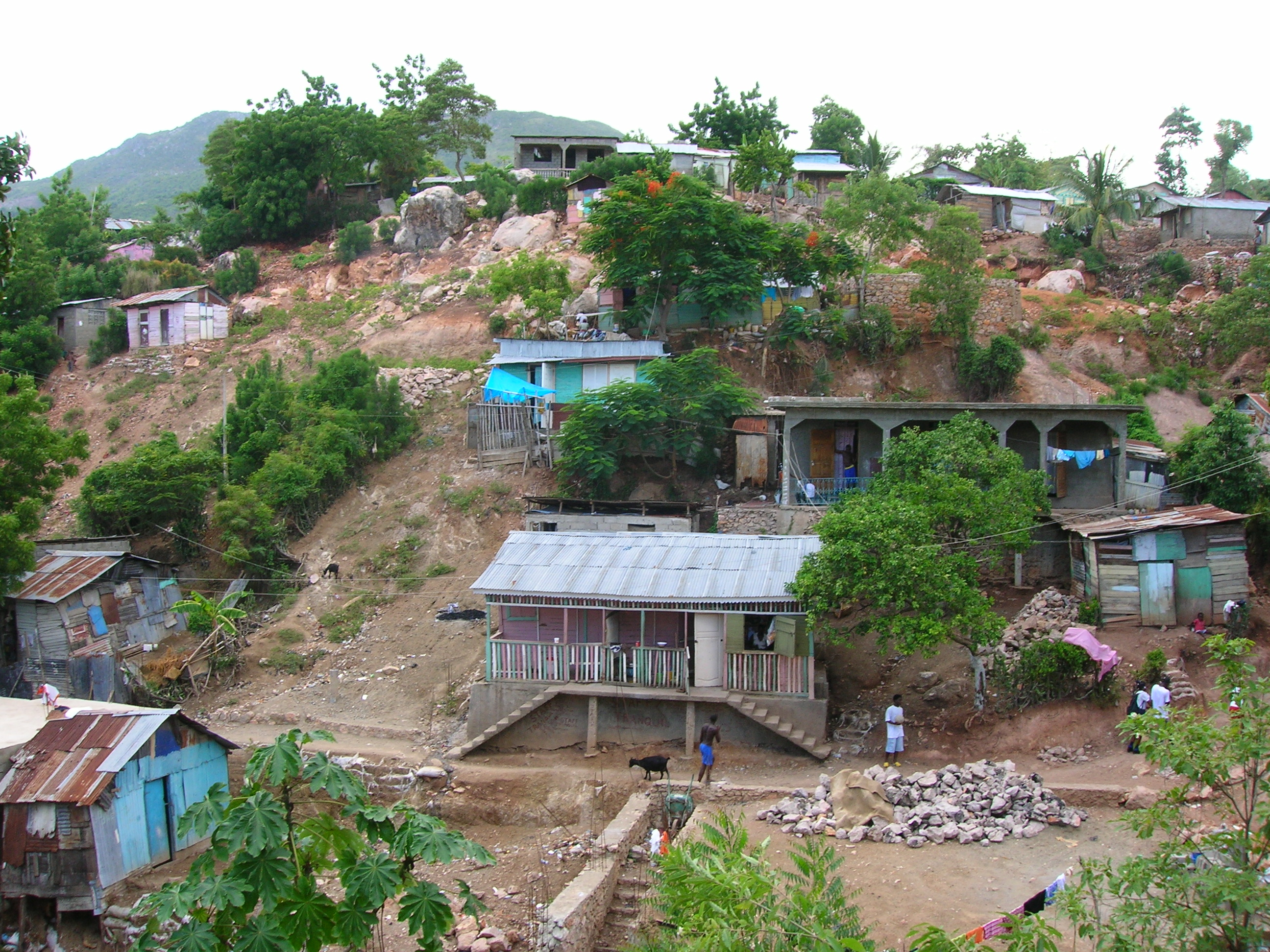
Slums in the area of Bas-Ravine, in the northern part of Cap-Haïtien

The impacts of structural violence are far reaching. They affect individuals, and overall social outcomes. Poverty is one of the biggest by-products of structural violence, as structural violence inhibits individuals and communities from achieving basic human rights. These basic rights include access to healthcare and education. As identified by the 2012 World Development Report, health and education are two key human capital endowments that can influence an individual's ability to reach his or her full potential in society. Due to the inability to receive proper education and maintain good health, individuals impacted by structural violence often are less well-positioned to attain better socio-economic opportunities or to be upwardly mobile. In 2012, Haiti was the poorest nation in the Western Hemisphere, with approximately 58.5% of its population lived below the nation's poverty line. The Gini coefficient for Haiti was 59.2 in 2001, making it the 7th highest nation in terms of its degree of inequality in the distribution of family income.

=== Education ===
Structural violence impacts one's ability to receive education. Haiti's literacy rate is about 60.7%, below the 90% average literacy rate for Latin American and other Caribbean countries. Due to the oppressive political and economic structures that are plaguing the nation, the educational sector in Haiti has limited financial support. The quality of education is low due to the lack of organization, expertise, and resources. There is a shortage of school supplies and qualified teachers. This problem is more prevalent in rural areas. Schools may use either outdated curricula or a partially implemented framework from the 1997 National Plan of Education and Training (NPET) curriculum. Due to the state's lack of institutional strength and capacity to provide basic education to the general Haitian population, the education sector is now predominantly privatized. A 2006 World Bank Study on the private education in Haiti found that 92% of all Haitian schools are privately owned, tuition-based institutions. Due to Haiti's widespread economic hardship, the majority of the nation's population is unable to meet the cost of education. 88% of children aged 6 to 12 are enrolled in school, and less than one-third of those enrolled reach fifth grade. Close to 60% of children drop out of school before receiving their primary education certificate. The 2006 World Bank report notes that "the high dropout rate is generally not reflective of a Haitian disregard for or disinterest in education; rather, it is an unfortunate consequence of limited family resources". In the poorest 20% of households in Haiti, school fees can represent up to 25% of a family's annual household income per child. Of those who were able to progress to secondary education, 75% go to private schools. Students who complete secondary schooling were not automatically eligible to enroll in a university. This is because approximately 90% of the higher education system consists of private universities with high tuition fees, making it unaffordable to the general population. While the average GDP per capita in Haiti is $673, tuition fees can exceed more than $2000 a year for Haitian private universities. There is also a lack of enrollment space among public Haitian universities, which comprise 5% of all institutions of higher learning.

=== Access to healthcare ===
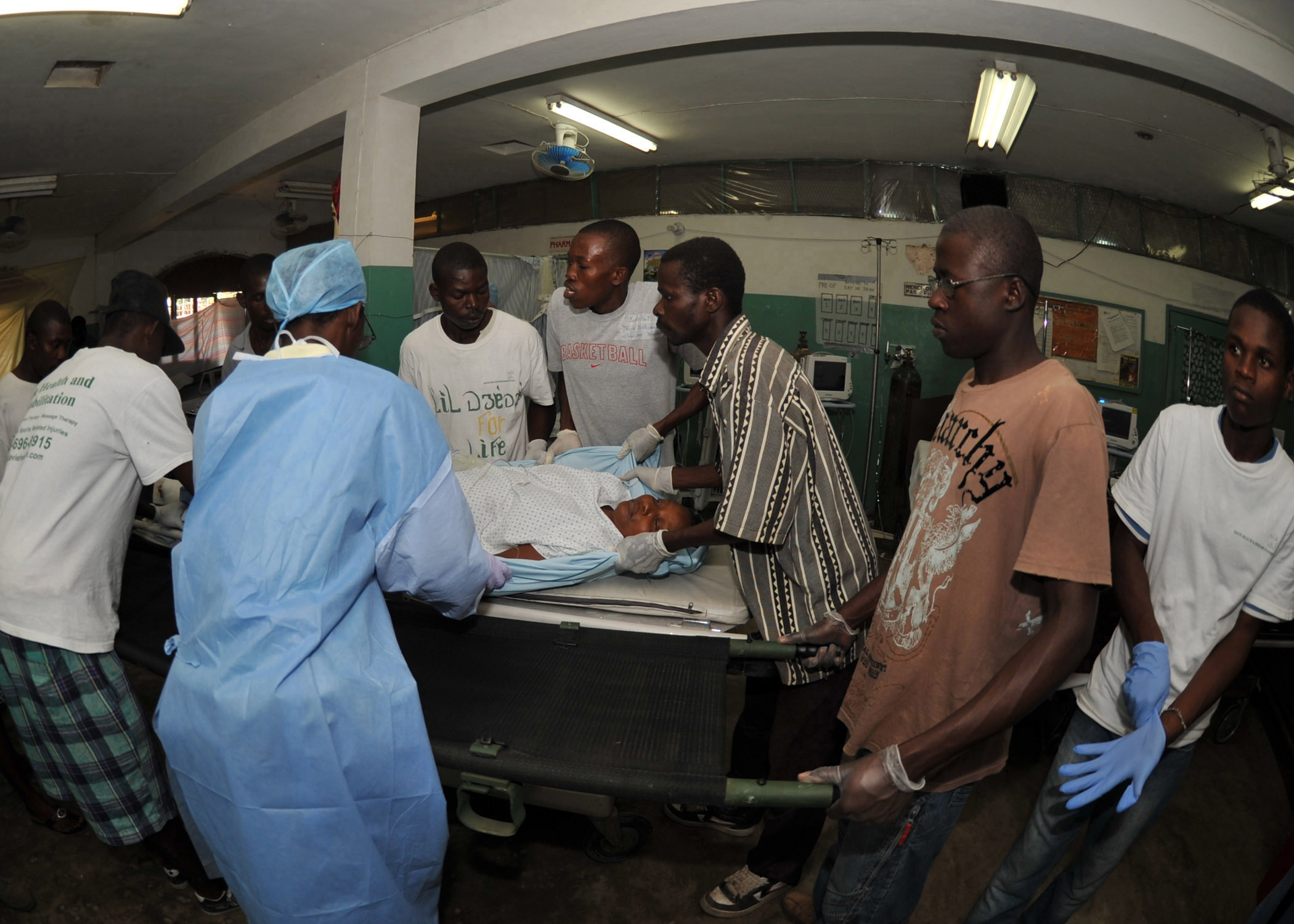
Medical personnel prepare a Haitian woman for surgery at the Milot hospital in Haiti

Serviced by a mixture of the public sector, the private sector, the non-profit sector, and religious institutions, the health system in Haiti faces the challenge of establishing efficient health coordination. This is further compounded by the presence of more than 250 additional implementing partners within the health sector. Coupled with a continuing series of political upheavals that have led to an unending social instability, Haiti's inefficient healthcare framework has crippled the nation's ability to provide good healthcare access to its people. The government has limited ability to provide services, where about 55% of health care is provided by missionaries or other non-governmental organizations. While there are a small number of physicians who operate for-profit clinics, most are found in the larger cities. Additionally, medical services, whether public or private are disproportionately located in the metropolitan Port-au-Prince area. Obstetric facilities also follow a similar trend. Hospitals outside the Port-au-Prince area provide limited obstetric services. In rural areas, prenatal care services are often delivered either by outreach teams or by small clinics that do not have formal maternity wards or delivery capabilities. This physical separation of adequate medical facilitates from parts of rural Haiti makes access to healthcare by those living away from the city difficult. While most medical infrastructures are concentrated within Port-au-Prince, these hospitals and clinical facilities are often in a dilapidated state as they are compromised by infrastructural deficiencies and electrical blackouts. This lack of medical infrastructure was further exacerbated by the 2010 Haiti earthquake. In 2007, 47% of the population lacked access to basic health care, with a majority of the population turning to traditional healers for various forms of treatment. A study on Haiti's prosthetic situation also revealed that less than 25% of all amputees obtain a prosthetic limb.

Access to healthcare also includes issues like perceived quality of care. While well-known national maternity hospitals located in Port-au-Prince are either at full capacity or overcapacity, rural maternity beds outside of Port-au-Prince, are under utilized, with utilization rates of about 30 to 35%. However, evidence suggests that pregnant women want competent care. This under-utilization of existing rural services is directly tied to the perceived and actual quality of the facilities. A widespread tendency to avoid government-run public facilities is frequently credited to those institutions' low quality of care, such as a lack of equipment and services, and unfriendly attitude of the medical staff.

=== Health outcomes ===
Structural violence impacts health outcomes at both an individual and communal level. Individually, structural violence creates barriers that prevent one from properly receiving and utilizing health care systems. Some of these barriers include high user fees, which lower health facility utilization levels, as well as social stigma around certain diseases that reduce utilization and thus negatively impact health outcomes for certain individuals. An example of how the pre-existing healthcare system reinforces social stigma is the way that facility-based health care is delivered to women. In most of Haiti's public health facilities, waiting lines for family planning services and HIV/AIDS testing are designed to be separate from those of routine care. This public separation thus makes visible the social stigma of sexually transmitted diseases, which can deter women from utilizing certain sex-related health services. Aside from individual impact, structural violence also impacts the society as a whole as it facilitates inequity in terms of the distribution of a society's resources and hence the overall quality of life of a society. This uneven distribution of resources across Haiti's society has created numerous social and economic disparities, all of which have led the country to perform below other countries in a series of health outcomes.

==== Life expectancy ====
According to the 2011 World Health Organization data on health indicators, the average life expectancy in Haiti at birth is 61 years for males and 64 years for females, lower than the global average of 70 years. In 2014, Haiti was ranked 186 out of the 223 countries studied for life expectancy at birth. In terms of healthy life expectancy, a 2013 study funded by the Bill & Melinda Gates Foundation, found Haiti's health life expectancy for males and females to be 27.8 and 37.1 years respectively, both of which are ranked as the lowest out of the 187 countries studied. Haiti's overall low ranking for life expectancy stems from a multitude of factors that includes high HIV/AIDS prevalence, lack of access to basic healthcare services, malnutrition, and poor sanitation.

==== Mortality rates ====
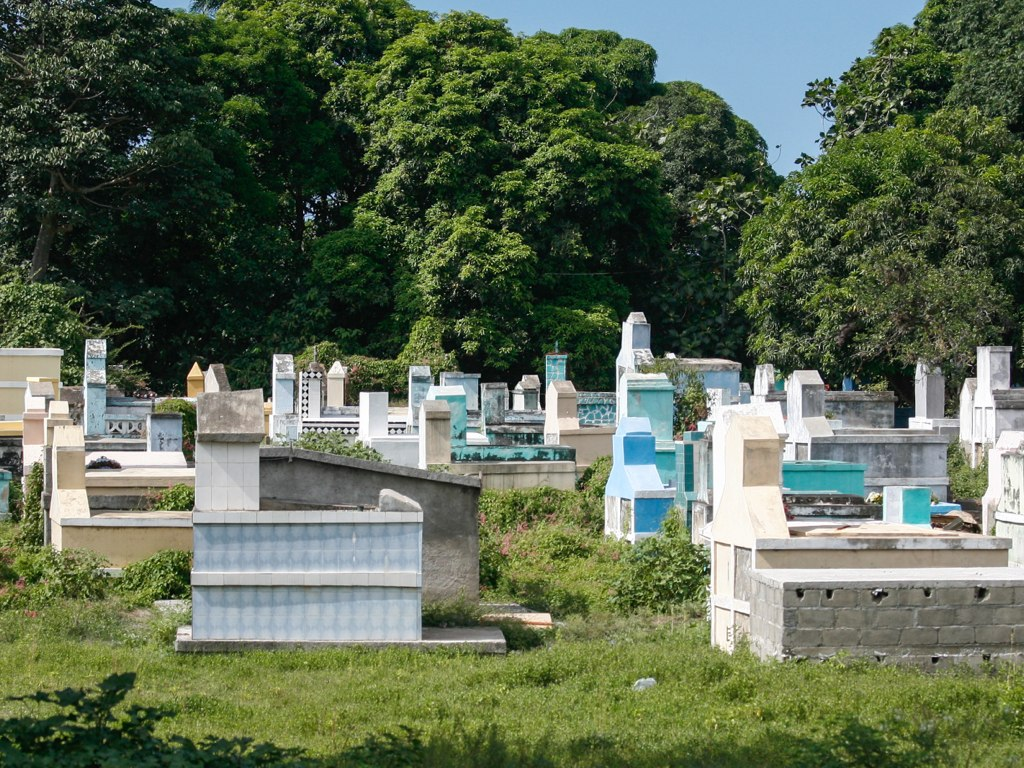
Haitian Cemetery

Mortality rates in Haiti are higher than world averages across all demographics. Today, Haiti has the highest rates of infant, under-five, and maternal mortality in the Western Hemisphere. High infection rates for diseases such as respiratory infections, malaria, tuberculosis, as well as sexually transmitted diseases like HIV/AIDS are the leading causes of death for Haitians. This largely comes from persisting inequalities in access to health services, especially between the rich and the rural poor. It is estimated that some 60% of Haitians, primarily those living in rural areas, lack access to basic health-care services. In terms of infant mortality, the UN Inter-agency Group for Child Mortality Estimation and World Health Organization report that 57 infants per every 1,000 live births die each year before reaching one year of age. The probability of infants dying under the age of five is 76 per 1,000 live births. With regards to maternal mortality, a maternal mortality study of 181 countries in 2008 found that Haiti's maternal mortality rate was approximately 582 deaths per 100,000 live births, which is one of the highest rates of maternal mortality in both the Caribbean and around the world. While the high maternal mortality rate in Haiti can be attributed to the fact that women in developing countries tend to have on average more pregnancies than those in developed countries, factors that play a much larger role include poverty, distance, and inadequate services, all of which are negative impacts of structural violence. As a result, women often experience long delays in seeking medical help for obstetric emergency, difficulty reaching an obstetric facility, or not receiving adequate care at the obstetric facility, all of which can be life-threatening for pregnant women living in resource-poor settings. In terms of the overall population, the mortality rates for Haitians between 15 and 60 years old is 258 and 223 per 1000 individuals for males and females respectively.

==== Burden of disease ====
The lack of development and spending on healthcare resources and services makes Haitians, particularly those living in rural areas, susceptible to diseases that are otherwise manageable. For example, the WHO confirmed that a typhoid fever outbreak that occurred in 2003 was due to a lack of access to doctors and clean water infrastructure. Across the nation, it is estimated that there are about 25 physicians and 11 nurses for every 100,000 Haitians. WHO also estimates that 43% of the population receives all the recommended immunizations. For communicable diseases, this means loss of herd immunity This lack of healthcare resources and a disease-friendly environment puts Haiti’s burden of disease to be much higher than that of most nations. In the 2010 World Malaria Report, confirmed cases of malaria in Haiti tripled from 16,897 to 49,535 between 2000 and 2009. As of 2012, less than 20% of all households in Haiti have Insecticide-treated bed nets to protect themselves against mosquitoes. In 2010, Haiti also experienced a cholera outbreak that spread quickly throughout the nation due to difficulties in healthcare access and the lack of experience of the healthcare system. By the end of 2010, a total of 179,379 cases, including 3,990 deaths were reported in Haiti. This represents 61% of all cases reported and 80% of all deaths globally. In 2006, prevalence of HIV/AIDS among adults was 2.2%. In 2012, the total estimated number of people of ALL ages living with HIV was approximately 150,000.

== Causes ==
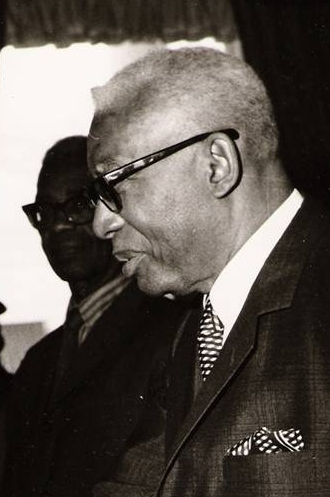
40th President of Haiti, François Duvalier

=== Political issues ===
One cause that has resulted in significant levels of structural violence within Haiti is political instability and corruption. Over the past 200 years, Haitian politics have gone through periods of social unrest and turmoil. The nation has experienced more than 30 Coup d'états. There has been a prolonged history of oppression by dictators. Political instability and corruption have left the country with a number of social problems, such as a lack of access to basic human rights, including education and healthcare; and an economy with a lower than average domestic product. According to the World Bank, Haiti ranks 162 out of 183 economies in the world and 31 out of 32 economies within Latin America and the Caribbean. This low economic ranking limits the level of job creation and availability. This lack of job creation contributes to Haiti's unemployment rate of 40.6%, with more than two-thirds of the labor force not holding formal jobs.

=== Impacts of post-colonialism ===
Another cause of structural violence is the impact of post-colonialism. During the 19th century, European expansion into the New World created social arrangements such as slavery and institutionalized racism. The remnants of these social structures exist today in the form of caste-based racial discrimination, which contributes to the social inequality and economic disparities present within Haiti. Comprising 5% of the nation's population, Haitian mulattoes and Haitians of European ancestry have retained positions of power. This is evident in the political, economic, social, and cultural hierarchy in present-day Haiti, where they control about 44% of the nation's income and Gross Domestic Product and hold the country's important positions. For instance, prominent Haitians and political leaders throughout Haiti's history have been either mulattoes or of European-descent. Within Haiti, light skin, straight hair, and European surnames continue to be important and defining characteristics that separate the traditional elites and upper class citizens from the rest of the population.

== See also ==
- Colorism
- Mulatto Haitians
- Poverty in Haiti
- Restavek
- Sexual violence in Haiti
- Social class in Haiti
