= Social class in Haiti =

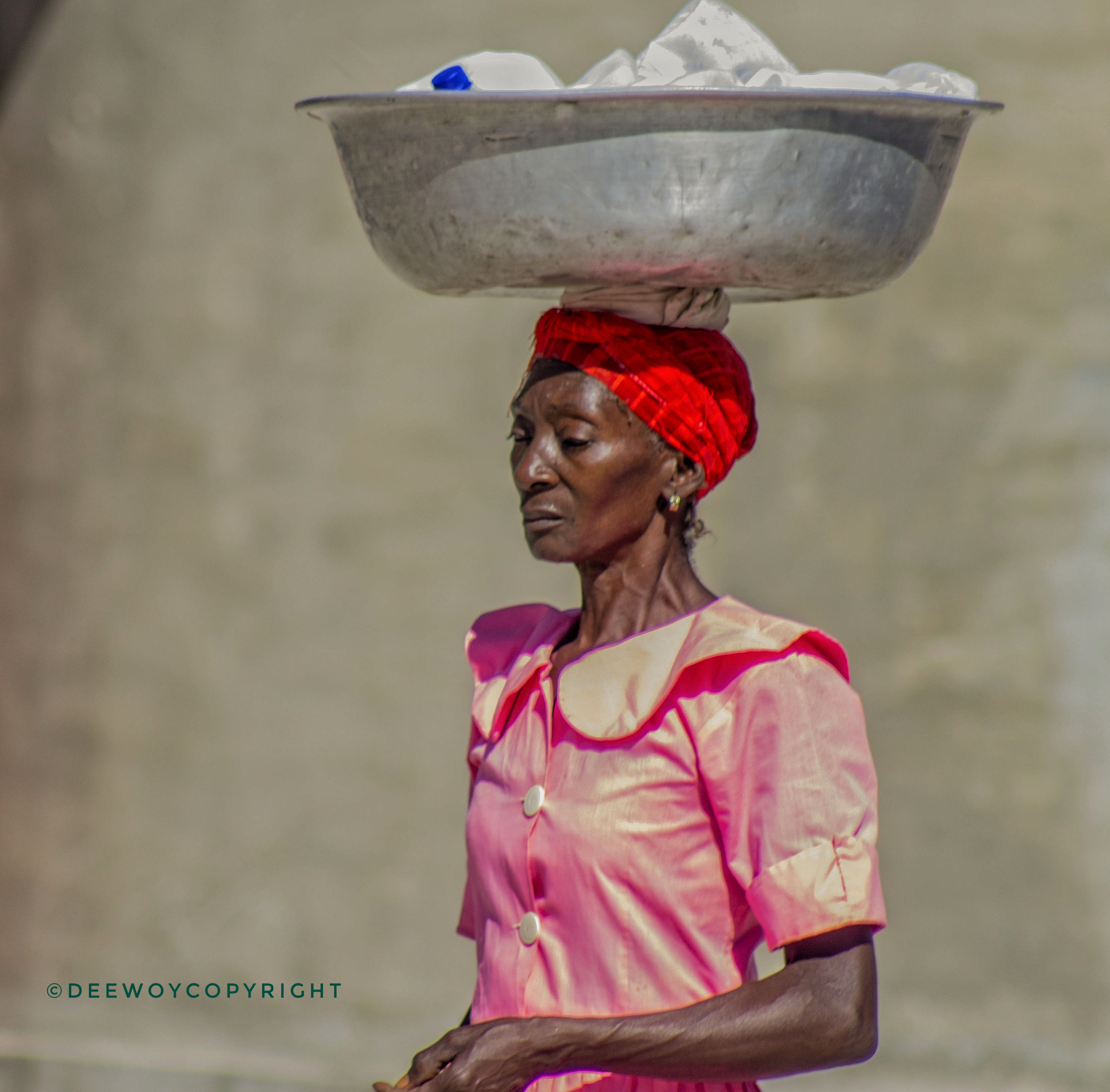
A merchant woman in Haiti

Social class in Haiti is defined by a class structure that groups people according to wealth, income, education, type of occupation, and membership in a specific subculture or social network. Race has also played an important factor in determining social class since the colonial period (1625–1804) when Haiti was the French colony of Saint-Domingue.

== History ==
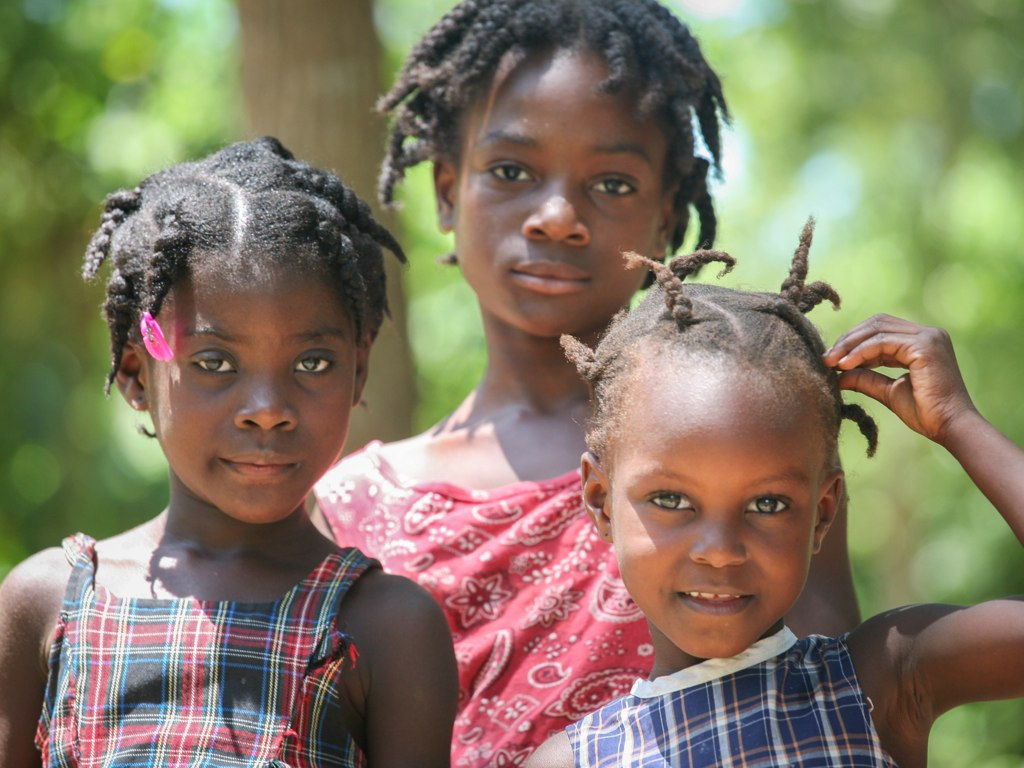
Haitian girls

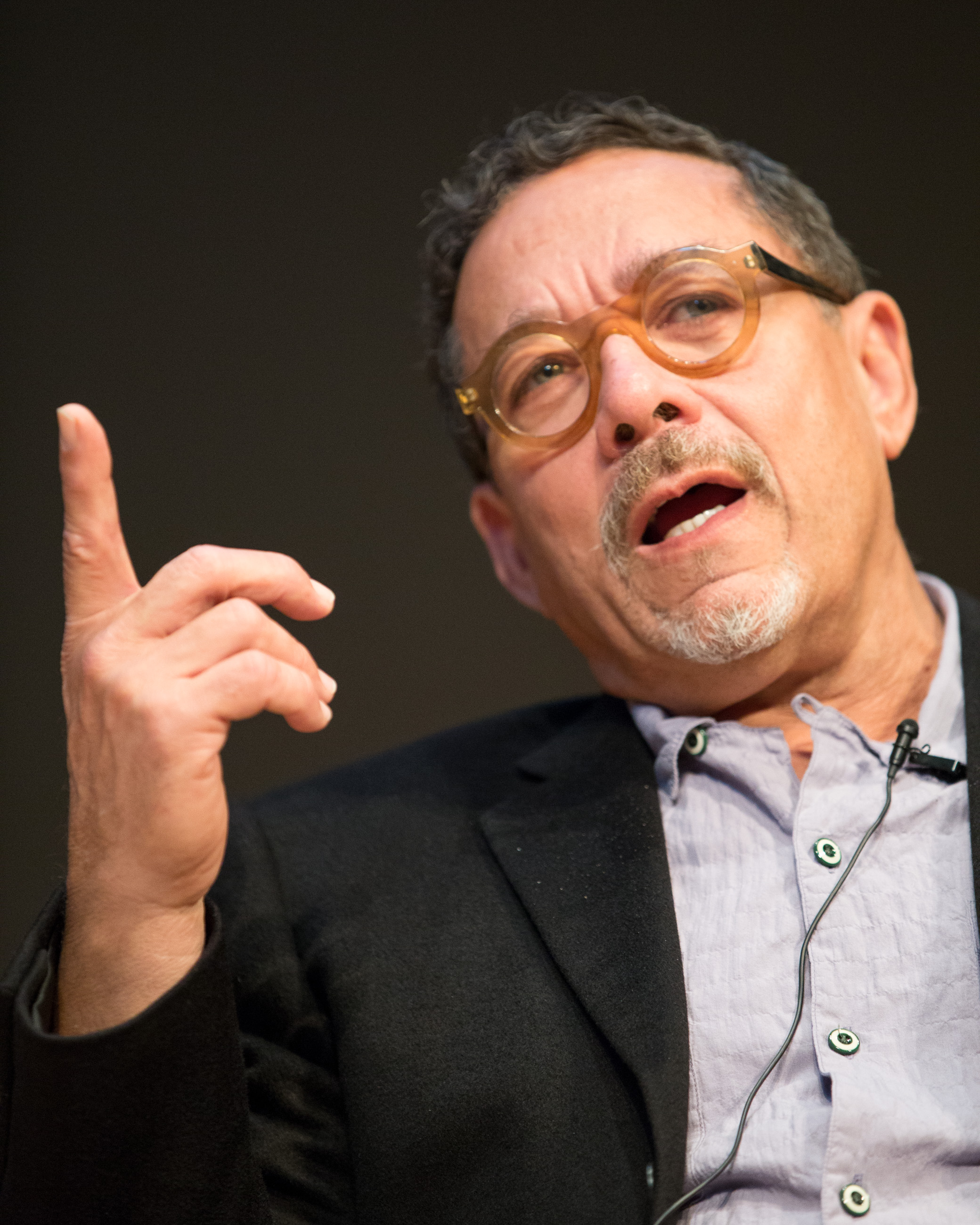
Haitian artist Edouard Duval-Carrie

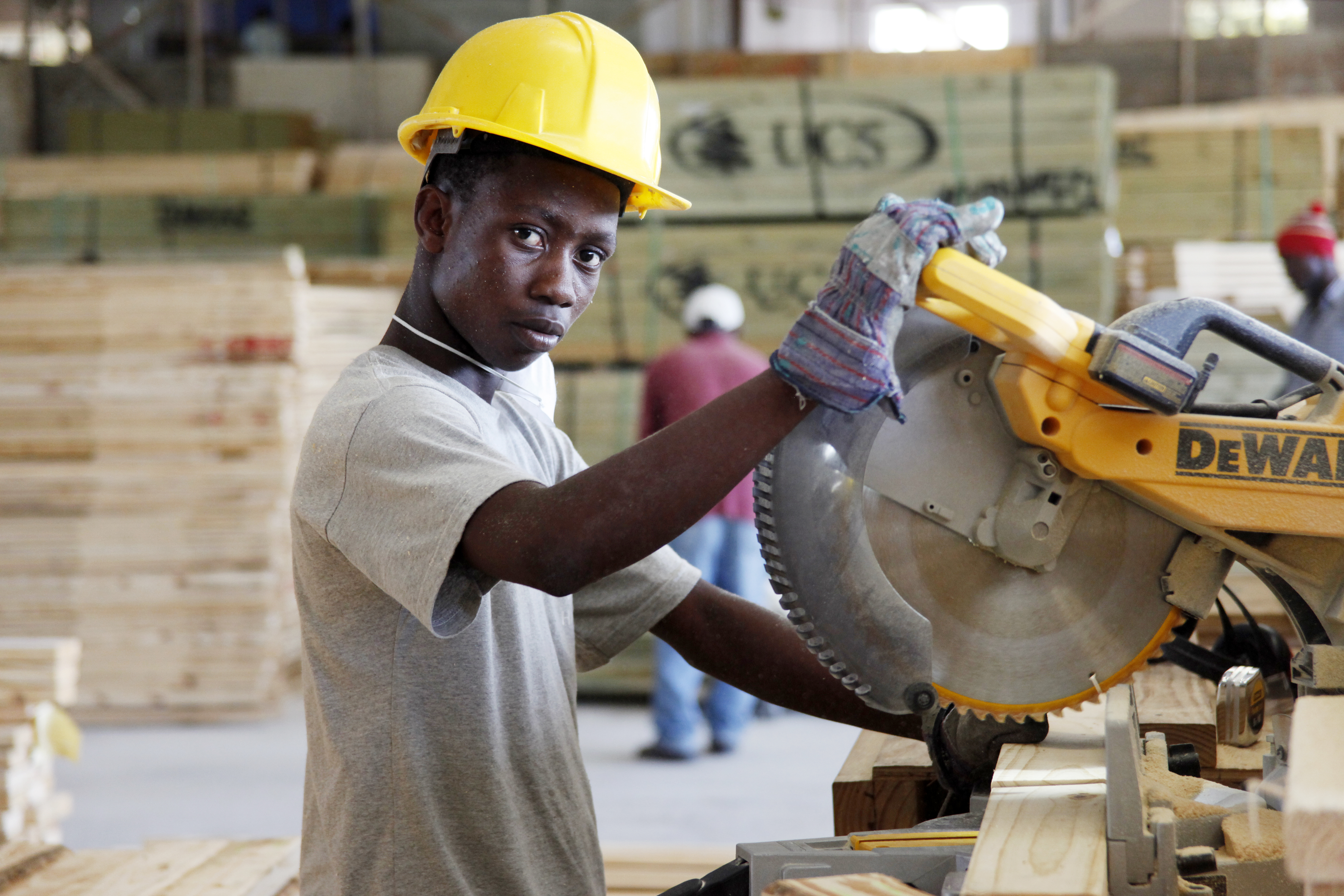
Factory worker

During the colonial period, the French imposed a three-tiered social structure similar to the casta system in colonial Hispanic America. At the top of the social and political ladder was the white elite (grands blancs). At the bottom of the social structure were the enslaved black (noirs), most of whom had been born in Africa. Between the white elite and the slaves arose a third group, the freedmen (affranchis), most of whom were descended from unions of slave owners and slaves (cf. plaçage). Some Mulatto freedmen inherited land from their white fathers, became relatively wealthy and owned slaves (perhaps as many as one-fourth of all slaves in Saint-Domingue belonged to affranchi owners). Nevertheless, racial codes kept the affranchis socially and politically inferior to the whites in the racial hierarchy. Also between the white elite and the slaves were the poor whites (petits blancs), who considered themselves socially superior to the Mulattoes, even if they sometimes found themselves economically inferior to them.

Of a population of 519,000 in 1791, 87 percent were slaves, 8 percent were whites, and 5 percent were freedmen. Because of harsh living and working conditions, the mortality rate among the enslaved blacks was extremely high, so new slaves were continuously imported to replace the ones who died. Thus, at the time of the slave rebellion of 1791, most slaves had been born in Africa rather than in Saint-Domingue.

The Haitian Revolution changed the country's social structure. The colonial ruling class, and much of the white population, was killed or expelled, and the plantation economy was largely destroyed. The earliest black and mulatto leaders attempted to restore a plantation system that relied on an essentially free labor force, through strict military control (see Independent Haiti, ch. 6), but the system collapsed during the tenure of Alexandre Pétion (1806–18). The Haitian Revolution broke up plantations and distributed land among the former slaves. Through this process, the new Haitian upper class lost control over agricultural land and labor, which had been the economic basis of colonial control. To maintain their superior economic and social position, the new Haitian upper class turned away from agricultural pursuits in favor of more urban-based activities, particularly government.

The nineteenth-century Haitian ruling class consisted of two groups: the urban elite and the military leadership. The urban elite were primarily a closed group of educated, comparatively wealthy, and French-speaking Mulattoes. Birth determined an individual's social position, and shared values and intermarriage reinforced class solidarity. The military, however, was a means of advancement for disadvantaged black Haitians. In a shifting, and often uneasy, alliance with the military, the urban elite ruled the country and kept the peasantry isolated from national affairs. The urban elite promoted French norms and models as a means of separating themselves from the peasantry. Thus, French language and manners, orthodox Roman Catholicism, and light skin were important criteria of high social position. The elite disdained manual labor, industry, and commerce in favor of the more genteel professions, such as law and medicine.

A small, but politically important, middle class emerged during the twentieth century. Although social mobility increased slightly, the traditional elite retained their economic preeminence, despite countervailing efforts by François Duvalier. For the most part, the peasantry continued to be excluded from national affairs, but by the 1980s, this isolation had decreased significantly. Still, economic hardship in rural areas caused many cultivators to migrate to the cities in search of a higher standard of living, thereby increasing the size of the urban lower class.

== Upper class ==
In the 1980s, Haiti's upper class constituted as little as 2 percent of the total population, but it controlled about 44 percent of the national income. The upper class included not only the traditional elite, which had not controlled the government for more than thirty years, but also individuals who had become wealthy and powerful through their connections with the governments of François Duvalier and his son, Jean-Claude Duvalier. Increased access to education helped carry some individuals into the ranks of the upper class. Others were able to move upward because of wealth they accrued in industry or export-import businesses.

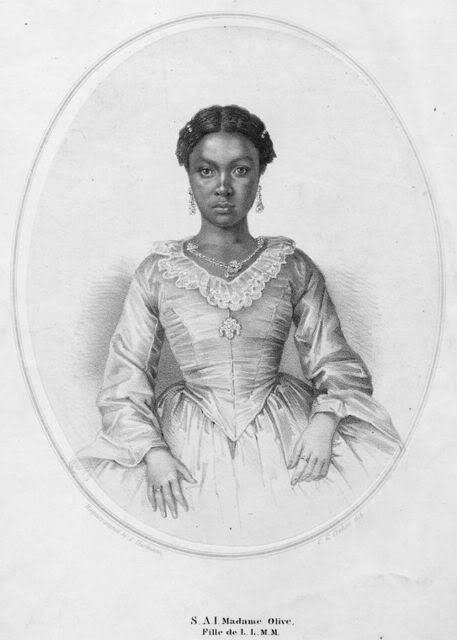
Princess Olive of Haiti

Fictional representatives of the Haitian elite such as the "Zuzu girl" (a naive rich bubblehead), and other recognizable cultural stereotypes, have been caricatured in the popular cultural comedy, Regards Croisés, on Télévision Nationale d'Haïti (TNH), the state television broadcaster of Haiti.

The traditional elite held key positions in trade, industry, real estate, and the professions, and they were identified by membership in "good families," which claimed several generations of recognized legal status and name. Being a member of the elite also required a thorough knowledge of cultural refinements, particularly the customs of the French. Light skin and straight hair continued to be important characteristics of this group. French surnames were common among the mulatto elite, but increased immigration from Europe and the Middle East in the late nineteenth and the early twentieth centuries had introduced German, English, Danish, and Arabic names to the roster.

The only group described as an ethnic minority in Haiti were the Levantine Haitians, people descended from Syrian, Lebanese, and Palestinian traders who began to arrive in Haiti and elsewhere in the Caribbean in the late nineteenth century. From their beginnings, as itinerant peddlers of fabrics and other dry goods, the Levantines moved into the export-import sector, engendering the hostility of Haitians and foreign rivals. Nevertheless, the Levantines remained. Many adopted French and Creole as their preferred languages, took Haitian citizenship, and integrated themselves into the upper and the middle classes. Formerly spurned by elite Mulatto families and excluded from the best clubs, the Levantines had begun to intermarry with elite Haitians and to take part in all aspects of upper-class life, including entry into the professions, industry, and so on.

== Middle class ==
The middle class became more defined during the United States occupation (1915–34). The creation of a professional military and the expansion of government services fostered the development of Haiti's middle class. Educational reform in the 1920s, an upsurge in black consciousness, and the wave of economic prosperity after World War II also contributed to the strengthening of the class. In the late 1980s, the middle class probably made up less than 5 percent of the total population, but it was growing, and it was becoming more politically powerful.

The mulatto elite dominated governments in the 1930s and the early 1940s and thwarted the political aspirations of the black middle class. President Dumarsais Estimé (1946–50) came to power with the aim of strengthening the middle class. The Duvalier government also claimed the allegiance of the black middle class, at least through the 1970s. During the Duvalier period, many in the middle class owed their economic security to the government. A number of individuals from this class, however, benefited from institutionalized corruption.

Some members of the middle class had acquired political power by the 1980s, but most continued to be culturally ambivalent and insecure. Class solidarity, identity, and traditions were all weak. The criteria for membership in the middle class included a non-manual occupation, a moderate income, literacy, and a mastery of French. Middle-class Haitians sought upward mobility for themselves and their children, and they perceived education and urban residence as two essential keys to achieving higher status. Although they attempted to emulate the lifestyle of the upper class, middle-class Haitians resented the social preeminence and the color prejudice of the elite. Conflicts between the Franco-Haitian and the Afro-Haitian cultural traditions were most common among the middle class.

== Peasants ==
Haiti's peasantry constituted approximately 75 percent of the total population. Unlike peasants in much of Latin America, most of Haiti's peasants had owned land since the early nineteenth century. Land was the most valuable rural commodity, and peasant families went to great lengths to retain it and to increase their holdings.

Peasants in general had control over their landholdings, but many lacked clear title to their plots. Haiti has never conducted a cadastral survey, but it is likely that many families have passed on land over generations without updating land titles. Division of land equally among male and female heirs resulted in farm plots that became too small to warrant the high costs of a surveyor. Heirs occasionally surveyed land before taking possession of it, but more frequently, heirs divided plots among themselves in the presence of community witnesses and often a notary. Some inherited land was not divided, but was used in common, for example, for pasture, or it was worked by heirs in rotation. Families commonly sold land to raise cash for such contingencies as funerals or to pay the expenses of emigration. Purchasers often held land with a notarized paper, rather than a formal deed (see Land Tenure and Land Policy, ch. 8).

There were strata within the peasantry based on the amount of property owned. Many peasants worked land as sharecroppers or tenants, and some hoped eventually to inherit the plots they worked. Some tenant farmers owned and cultivated plots in addition to the land they worked for others. The number of entirely landless peasants who relied solely on wage labor was probably quite small. Agricultural wages were so low that peasants deprived of land were likely to migrate to urban areas in search of higher incomes. Wealthier peasants maintained their economic positions through the control of capital and influence in local politics.

Peasants maintained a good, positive identity as Haitians and as workers of the land, but they exhibited a weak sense of class consciousness. Bickering among peasants were more common than unified resentment toward the upper class.

Cooperation among peasants diminished during the twentieth century. Farms run by nuclear families and exchanges among extended families had formed the basis of the agrarian system. Until the middle of the twentieth century, collective labor teams, called kounbit, and larger labor-exchange groups were quite common. These groups were formed to carry out specific tasks on an individual's land; the owner provided music and a festive meal. After the 1940s, smaller groups, called eskouad, began to replace the kounbit. The eskouad carried out tasks on a strictly reciprocal basis or sold their collective labor to other peasants.

Although Haitian peasant villages generally lacked a sense of community and civic-mindedness, some civic-action groups had emerged over the years. After the 1960s, wealthy peasants led rural community councils, which were supervised by the government. These councils often served more to control the flow of development resources into an area than to represent the local population. In the 1980s, a countervailing movement of small peasant groups (groupman) emerged with support from the Roman Catholic Church, principally in the Plateau Central. The groupman discussed common interests and undertook some cooperative activities. Both the Duvalier governments and the succeeding National Council of Government (Conseil National de Gouvernement—CNG), headed by Lieutenant General Henri Namphy, took steps to curb the activities of these peasant groups.

The first generation of Haitian peasants pursued independence, freedom, and peace. The necessity of devoting at least some share of their limited hectarage to the production of cash crops, however, hindered the peasants' ability to achieve independence in the cultivation of domestic staples. Although they acquired a degree of freedom, they also found themselves isolated from the rest of the nation and the world. In the second half of the twentieth century, the Haitian peasantry gradually became much less isolated. Several factors accelerated the peasants' involvement with the outside world in the 1970s and the 1980s. Road projects improved the transportation system, and foreign religious missions and private development agencies penetrated the rural areas. These organizations brought new resources and provided an institutional link to the outside world. People from almost every community had migrated to Port-au-Prince or overseas, and they sent money home to rural areas. Cassette tapes enabled illiterate people who had traveled far from home to communicate with their families. Creole, which became commonly used on radio, brought news of Haiti and the world to remote villages. And in 1986, media coverage of the fall of the Duvalier regime put rural Haitians in touch with the political affairs of the nation.

== Urban lower class ==
The urban lower class, which made up about 15 percent of the total population in the early 1980s, was concentrated in Port-au-Prince and the major coastal towns. Increased migration from rural areas contributed greatly to the growth of this class. Industrial growth was insufficient, however, to absorb the labor surplus produced by the burgeoning urbanization; unemployment and underemployment were severe in urban areas. The urban lower class was socially heterogeneous, and it had little class consciousness. One outstanding characteristic of this group was its commitment to education. Despite economic hardships, urban lower-class parents made a real effort to keep their children in school throughout the primary curriculum. Through education and political participation, some members of the lower class achieved mobility into the middle class.

The poorest strata of the urban lower class lived under Haiti's worst sanitary and health conditions. According to the World Bank (see Glossary), one-third of the population of Port-au-Prince lived in densities of more than 1,000 people per hectare in 1976. The poorest families consumed as few as seven liters of water per person, per day, for cooking, drinking, and cleaning, and they spent about one-fifth of their income to obtain it. For many of these families, income and living conditions worsened in the 1980s.

== See also ==
- Colorism
- Mulatto Haitians
- Poverty in Haiti
- Restavek
- Structural violence in Haiti
