= Poverty in Haiti =

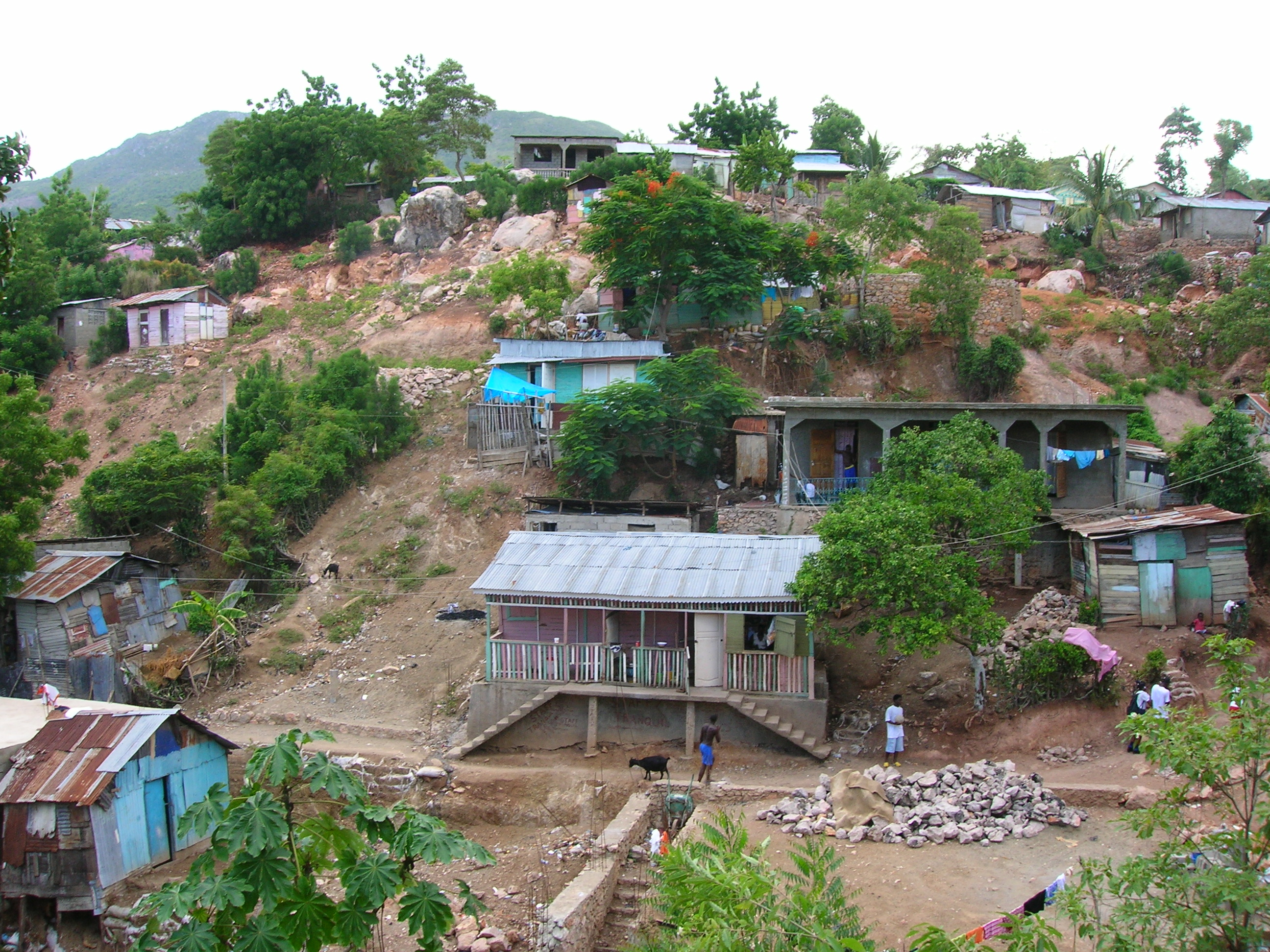
Slums in the area of Bas-Ravine, in the northern part of Cap-Haïtien

Poverty in Haiti is a long lasting issue that affects the residents on a daily basis playing a significant role in their everyday lives. Issues including housing, nutrition, education, healthcare, infant mortality rates, and environmental factors are very common amongst the poorest communities in the nation. Haiti has long struggled with poor living conditions in the more rural areas of the country causing many Haitians to migrate towards the capital city of Port-au-Prince. Poverty in Haiti is regarded as among the most severe in the Western Hemisphere.

== Agriculture ==
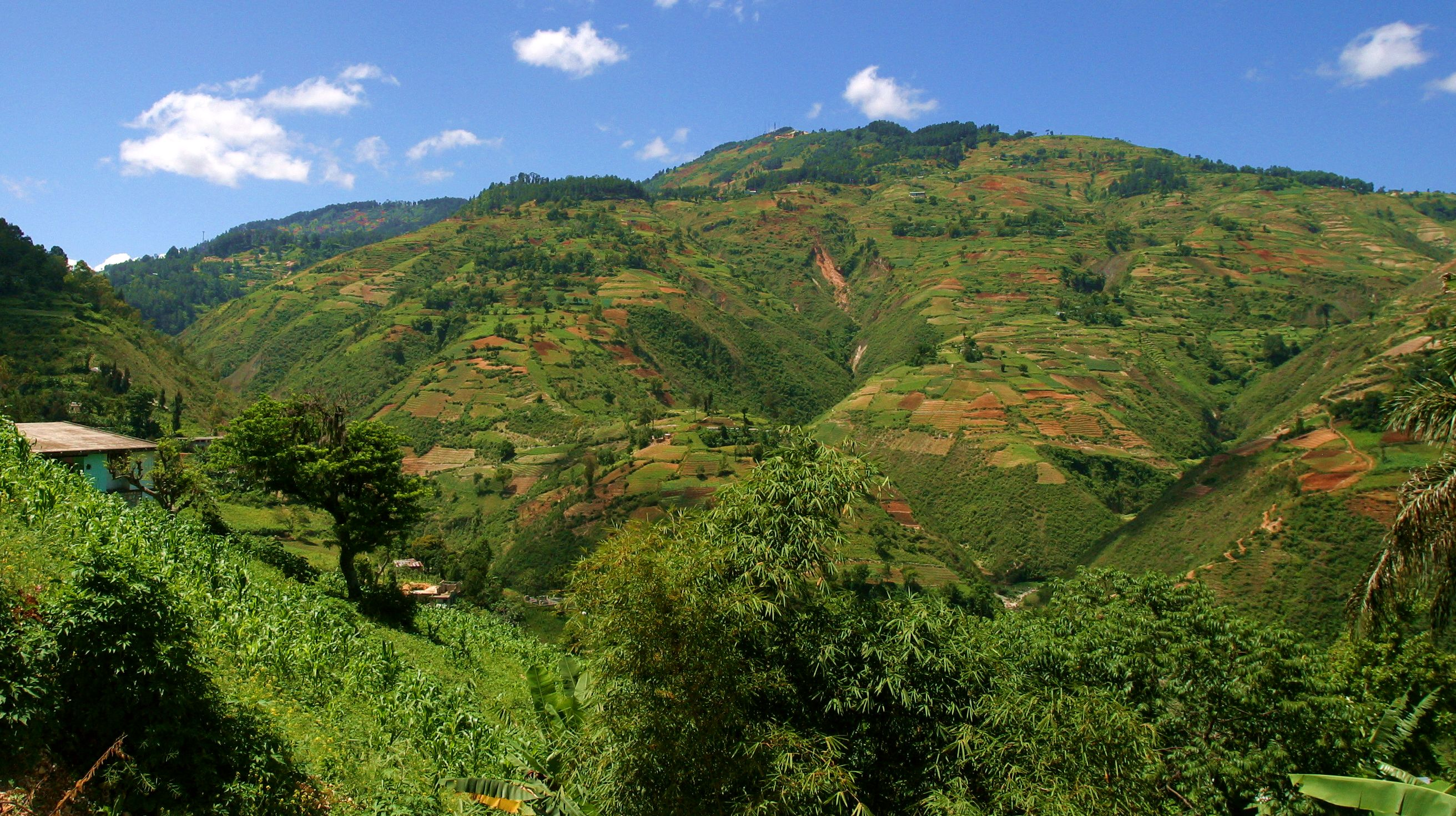
Mountainous farming plots near Port-au-Prince, Haiti

With a terrain more mountainous than Switzerland, Haiti has a limited amount of arable land. According to soil surveys conducted by the United States Department of Agriculture in the early 1980s, 11.3% of the land was highly suitable for crops, while 31.7% was suitable with some restrictions related to erosion, topography, or conservation. The surveys revealed that 2.3% was mediocre because of poor drainage, but was acceptable for rice cultivation, while 54.7% was appropriate only for tree crops or pastures due to severe erosion or steep slopes. According to estimates of land use in 1978, 42.2% of land was under constant or shifting cultivation, 19.2% was pasture land, and 38.6% was not cultivated.

The use of purchased inputs, such as fertilizers, pesticides, machinery, and irrigation, is rare due to farmers in Haiti employing more traditional agricultural methods. Haiti utilizes more traditional cultivation methods than any other country in the Western Hemisphere due to the cost and absence of modern equipment. Small farmers also lack timely access to credit which impacts their ability to capitalize on certain crops and growing seasons. When credit is available, it is usually provided at usurious rates which gave rise to the local informal credit industry. The country's major public financial institutions provide loans to the agricultural sector, but benefit less than 10% of all farmers. Major credit sources included the Agricultural Credit Bureau, agriculture credit societies, credit unions, cooperatives, and institutions created by nongovernmental organizations.

== CIA World Factbook ==
In 2015, the gross domestic product in Haiti was estimated to be US$18.54 billion by The World Factbook, ranked 146 (out of 230 countries) in the world. Although GDP growth in Haiti is among the fastest in the region, it has not been sufficient to significantly reduce poverty rates.

Field	Haiti
GDP (purchasing power parity):	$18.54 billion (2014 est.)
GDP - per capita (PPP):	$1,800 (2014 est.)
Life expectancy at birth:	63.18 years (2014 est.)
Population growth rate:	1.08% (2014 est.)
Health expenditures:	9.4% of GDP (2013)
Literacy:	total population: 60.7% (2015 est.)

== United Nations Development Program ==
The United Nations Development Program estimated the national poverty rate in 2014 at 58.6%, with those living in abject poverty at 24.7%.

Key reported figures of the UNDP Millennium Development Goals (MDG) are as follows:

The richest 1% of Haitians possesses the same wealth as the bottom 45% of the income distribution. There is a new baseline of poverty in Haiti, based on consumption. The national poverty rate is 58.6%, and the extreme poverty rate is 24.7%.

The net enrollment rate in primary education has increased steadily from 47% in 1993 to 88% in 2011. The number of children vaccinated against measles increased from 25.80% in 1987 to 85% in 2013. In rural areas, 75% of child births are still without the assistance of qualified personnel in obstetrics. In urban areas, the majority of women give birth with medical assistance—nearly 60%. HIV/AIDS prevalence has stabilized between young Haitians aged 15–24 years, from 1% in 2006 to 0.9% in 2012.

== Corruption ==
In 2014, Haiti ranked as the fifteenth most corrupt country in the world by Transparency International's Corruption Perception Index with a CPI score of 19, compared to the United States' score of 74. The Corruption Perceptions Index measures the perceived levels of public sector corruption worldwide. No country achieves a perfect score, and more than two-thirds score below 50 on a scale from 0 (very corrupt) to 100 (very little corruption).

Studies conducted by Transparency International show a strong correlation between corruption and poverty. Corruption can affect several sectors of a nation causing problems in the social, political, and economic spheres. Widespread corruption can lead to factors that inhibit national succession such as: lower economic growth rates, a biased tax system, a wide disparity between the rich and the poor, the lackluster implementation of social programs, lower welfare spending, and unequal access to education.

Although Haiti has a high economic growth rate for the region, several social programs, and decreasing educational cost, studies have shown that international donors have been slow to assist Haiti, mainly due to perceived widespread corruption and structural problems present in the country.

The United Nations estimates a total of US$13.34 billion has been earmarked for the 2010 Haiti earthquake that inflicted $7.8 billion in damages, however, two years after the incident, less than half of that amount had been allocated. This is due in a large part to the perceived corruption of the Haitian government, and yet less than 5% of Humanitarian aid was channeled through it. According to the UN Office of the Special Envoy for Haiti, as of March 2012, Humanitarian funding committed or disbursed by bilateral and multilateral donors in 2010 and 2011, only 1% has been pledged to the Haitian Government.

== Infant mortality ==
Haiti has long struggled with its abnormally high infant mortality rate even amongst impoverished nations. Haiti's infant mortality rate of 53 deaths per 1,000 live births (in 2011) is the result of the poor healthcare system, extreme poverty, and the impact of the AIDS epidemic. The country made notable progress in health indicators, with infant mortality decreasing 44% since 1990, faster than the global average, according to the 2014 United Nations Development Program report.

Under age 1 (per 1,000 live births)
Year	Deaths
1990	99
2009	64
2011	53
Under age 5 (per 1,000 live births)
Year	Deaths
1990	143
2009	87
2011	70

== Inequality ==
Haiti ranks 59.5 in the Gini Coefficient index, with the richest 10% of Haitians receiving 47.83% of the nation's income, while the poorest 10% receive less than 0.9%.

== History ==
On April 17, 1825, the French king (Charles X) issued a decree stating France would recognize Haitian independence, but only at the price of 150 million francs – 10 times the amount the U.S. had paid for the Louisiana territory. The sum was meant to compensate the French colonists for their lost revenues from slavery. Newspaper articles from the period reveal that the French king knew the Haitian government was hardly capable of making these payments, as the total was more than 10 times Haiti’s annual budget. Baron de Mackau, whom Charles X sent to deliver the ordinance, arrived in Haiti in July, accompanied by a squadron of 14 brigs of war carrying more than 500 cannons. With the threat of violence looming, on July 11, 1825, Haitian president Jean-Pierre Boyer signed the document, which stated, “The present inhabitants of the French part of St. Domingue shall pay … in five equal installments … the sum of 150,000,000 francs, destined to indemnify the former colonists.” Researchers have found that the independence debt and the resulting drain on the Haitian treasury were directly responsible not only for the underfunding of education in 20th-century Haiti, but also lack of health care and the country’s inability to develop public infrastructure.

== See also ==
- Causes of poverty in Haiti
- Colorism
- Mulatto Haitians
- Restavek
- Saint-Domingue
- Social class in Haiti
- Structural violence in Haiti
