= Saint-Jean-du-Sud =

Saint-Jean-du-Sud Sen Jan disid
- Commune
- Interactive map of Saint-Jean-du-Sud
- Location in Haiti
- Coordinates: 18°5′0″N 73°49′0″W
- Country: Haiti
- Department: Sud
- Arrondissement: Port-Salut

Area
  - Total: 69.29 km^{2} (26.75 sq mi)
- Elevation: 0 m (0 ft)

Population (2015)
  - Total: 25,567
  - Density: 369.0/km^{2} (955.7/sq mi)
- Time zone: UTC−05:00 (EST)
  - Summer (DST): UTC−04:00 (EDT)
- Postal code: HT 8220

Saint-Jean-du-Sud (French pronunciation: [sɛ̃ ʒɑ̃ dy syd]; Haitian Creole: Sen Jan disid) is a commune in the Port-Salut Arrondissement, in the Sud department of Haiti. In 2015, it had 25,567 inhabitants.

== Settlements ==
- Bel Anse
- Ca Vilason
- Chiedent
- Dumord
- Gaspard
- Groteaux
- Jabon
- Martin
- Moulio
- Nan Garde
- Saint-Jean
- Trou Palouse
