= Arniquet =

Arniquet: Anikè
- Commune
- Interactive map of Arniquet
- Location in Haiti
- Coordinates: 18°9′0″N 73°53′0″W
- Country: Haiti
- Department: Sud
- Arrondissement: Port-Salut

Area
  - Total: 59.29 km^{2} (22.89 sq mi)
- Elevation: 24 m (79 ft)

Population (2015)
  - Total: 29,180
  - Density: 492.2/km^{2} (1,275/sq mi)
- Time zone: UTC−05:00 (EST)
  - Summer (DST): UTC−04:00 (EDT)
- Postal code: HT 8230

Arniquet (French pronunciation: [aʁnikɛ]; Haitian Creole: Anikè) is a commune in the Port-Salut Arrondissement, in the Sud department of Haiti. In 2015, the commune had 29,180 inhabitants.

== Settlements ==
- Arniquet
- Bileux
- La Source
- Scipion
