= Human rights in Haiti =

Haiti's Constitution and written laws meet most international human rights standards. In practice, many provisions are not respected. The government's human rights record is poor. Political killings, kidnapping, torture, and unlawful incarceration are common unofficial practices, especially during periods of coups or attempted coups.

== History ==
The land that would become Haiti was first colonized by Spain at the end of the 15th century. The Spanish essentially wiped out the native Taíno people through slavery and smallpox, to which the Taíno had no immunity. An early defender of more humane treatment of the Taíno was the Spanish priest Bartolomé de Las Casas. Albeit too late to save the Taíno, Las Casas was able to persuade the Spanish government that the Taíno could not withstand such cruel treatment. This had the tragic side effect of the importation of African slaves to replace the labor of the diminishing Taíno.

Initially, Las Casas believed Africans to be suitable for slavery, but he later came to oppose their enslavement too. "I soon repented and judged myself guilty of ignorance. I came to realize that black slavery was as unjust as Indian slavery...and I was not sure that my ignorance and good faith would secure me in the eyes of God," Las Casas wrote in The History of the Indies in 1527.

In 1697, Spain formally ceded to France control of the part of the island of Hispaniola that would become Haiti, naming it Saint-Domingue. Slavery in Saint-Domingue, France's most lucrative colony, was known to be especially brutal, with a complete turnover of the slave population due to death every 20 years. According to the historian Laurent Dubois, between 5 and 10 percent of slaves died every year due to overwork and disease, a rate that outpaced births. The dead were replaced by new slaves from Africa.

In 1791, what would become known as the Haitian Revolution began. Predominantly a slave revolt, Haitians finally won their freedom and independence from France in 1804.

In 1825, France's King Charles X threatened to invade Haiti unless it paid an "independence debt" of 150 million francs to reimburse France for the loss of its slaves and land. The debt was later reduced to 90 million francs but it was not until 1947 that Haiti had paid off what many have regarded as an immoral and illegal debt. To pay this, Haiti had to borrow money from and pay interest to French banks.

"We're talking about 200 hundred years of this cycle of debt that Haiti has gone through, which of course has devastating consequences on the capacity of the state within the country," Haiti historian Laurent Dubois has said.

The country's poverty made it vulnerable throughout its history to political instability and human rights abuses both by Haitian state officials and foreign interventions.

In 1915, following a coup that led to the mob killing of Haitian President Vibrun Guillaume Sam, United States sailors and marines landed in order to protect U.S. interests in the country. The occupation would last until 1934. "Following restoration of order, a treaty providing for United States control over Haitian finances, customs, police, public works, sanitation, and medical services were concluded with the client Haitian government," according to the Navy Department Library.

During the occupation roads and other public works projects were built by the corvée labour—forced, unpaid work—of Haitian peasants.

In 1916, the U.S. military started a Haitian army that would later become the Garde d'Haiti. Beginning with the Caco Wars, during the US occupation, and continuing until the 1990s, the Haitian army was implicated in a number of human rights abuses against the Haitian people. For example, following a 1991 coup by the military that overthrew democratically elected President Jean-Bertrand Aristide, the Haitian army was accused of killing an estimated 3,000 people in three years. Upon his return to the presidency, Aristide disbanded the army. Survivors of the 2018 Lasalin massacre allege that the PHTK, ruling political Party headed by Jovenel Moïse, were responsible for the orchestrated attack and mass murder of civilians. Schools and other community buildings were also targeted. U.S.A. Government involvement in Haiti is on-going.

=== Duvalier period ===
In 1957, François Duvalier, known as "Papa Doc", became president of Haiti, ushering in a period of human rights abuses. An estimated 30,000–60,000 people were killed in the 30 years Haiti was under the rule of Duvalier and his son and successor Jean-Claude Duvalier, known as "Baby Doc".

In 1959, François Duvalier formed a paramilitary force known as the Tonton Macoute, named after a mythic Haitian character who kidnapped misbehaving children, carried them off in a bag and ate them for breakfast. Duvalier authorized more than 10,000 Tonton Macoute, organized in 500 sections across the country, to maintain complete control over the population. "The macoutes were Papa Doc's version of brownshirts and the Waffen SS, except that their usual uniform was blue jeans, T-shirts, sunglasses, and they carried clubs or pistols," wrote journalist and author Herbert Gold in Best Nightmare on Earth: A Life in Haiti. "They were loyal only to Papa Doc. In return, they could rob, steal, extort, torture and murder at will."

The Tonton Macoute continued to openly terrorise the population until they were officially disbanded after Jean-Claude Duvalier was forced from the presidency and went into exile in 1986.

== Law and order ==
The government in Haiti is known for running a slow, inefficient and corrupt system of justice. Allegations of torture and kidnapping are common, and the number of Haitian citizens imprisoned without trial is huge.

Lawyers' immunity is under constant threat. Under the Duvalier regime, lawyers were intimidated from defending their clients through pressure and violence. Courts of justice were in effect "run by the judges, appointed by the "

'President for Life' (the Duvaliers), who lacked the independence to make judgments about abuses against human rights." To this day, there is still no guarantee for lawyers' immunity in Haiti, as would seem to be suggested by the 2009 unconstitutional arrest without warrant of human-rights defender Osner Fevry, and the arrest in 2013 of Andre Michel, a lawyer critical of the government.

== Prolonged pretrial detention ==
Although the Constitution mandates an independent judiciary and the right to a fair trial, prolonged pretrial detention remains a serious problem. Because the court system and its records are poorly organized, it is impossible to determine the exact percentage of prisoners being held without trial. A study by the International Centre for Prison Studies, in partnership with the University of Essex, estimated that in 2013 nearly 71 percent of 9,921 prisoners in Haiti had not yet had a trial. According to the Centre, the majority of countries in the world have percentages ranging between 10 and 40 percent of such prisoners; Haiti's estimated 71 percent is one of the highest in the world.

== Freedom of expression ==
The Constitution guarantees freedom of speech and of the press, and the government generally has respected these rights. Many journalists, however, practice a measure of self-censorship to protect themselves from retribution. During the second Aristide administration (2000–4), some reports contend that members of the press were killed for supporting opposition movements.

The government does not censor radio, television, or the Internet. Security forces frequently have ignored the constitutionally mandated freedom of assembly and organization. The Haitian government generally has respected religious freedom in the country.

== Gender, disability, race and language ==
Haiti's Constitution does not contain specific language prohibiting discrimination on the basis of race, sex, language, age, or disability. Although some working standards exist to protect women, few resources exist to ensure enforcement. Abuses against women and children are common. Rape, although illegal, rarely results in prosecution of the perpetrator. Article 269 of the Penal Code of Haiti excuses a husband for murdering his wife and her "accomplice" ("complice") if the wife is found in an adulterous affair. Wives do not enjoy the same right.

The Haitian government has a Ministry of Women's Affairs, but lacks resources to address issues such as violence against women and harassment in the workplace.

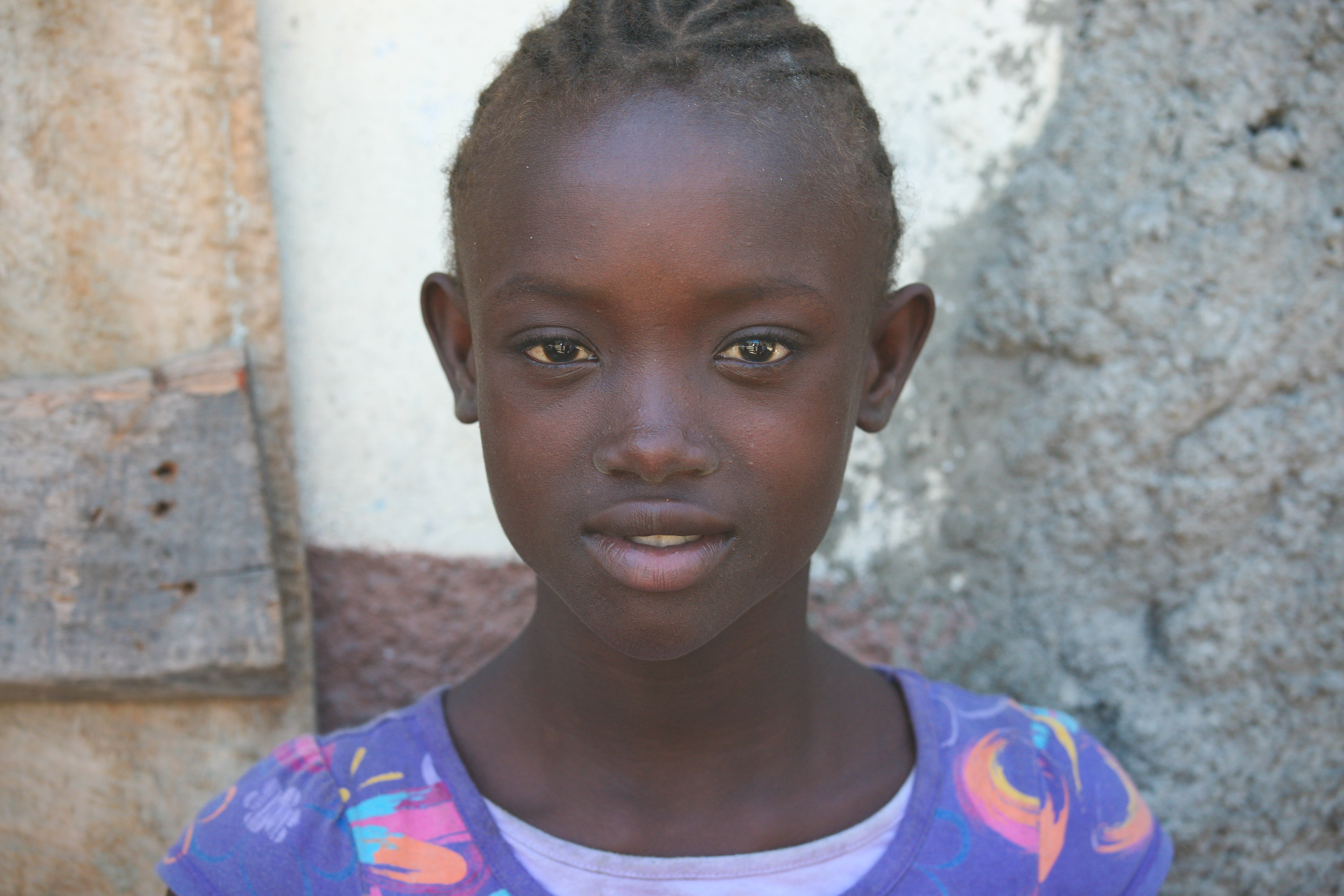
Haitian girl, pictured 2012

== Children ==
In addition to suffering from chronic malnourishment and a lack of educational opportunity, many Haitian children also suffer physical abuse. In 2004 the Ministry of Labor and Social Affairs reported that its hotline received more than 700 calls from children reporting abuse. Few statistics regarding the wider problem of child abuse have been collected. Trafficking of children also is a significant problem. UNICEF estimates that 2,000 to 3,000 Haitian children per year are trafficked to the Dominican Republic.

=== Restavek system ===
The term restavek is used in Haiti for a child sold by its parents to work for a host household as a domestic servant because the parents are unable to support the child. The practice meets formal international definitions of modern day slavery and child trafficking, and is believed to affect an estimated 300,000 Haitian children. The number of CDW (Child Domestic Workers) in Haiti, defined as 1) living away from parents' home; 2) not following normal progression in education; and 3) working more than other children, is more than 400,000. 25% of Haitian children aged 5 to 17 live away from their biological parents.

Restaveks are unpaid and have no power or recourse within the host family. Unlike slaves in the traditional sense, restaveks can run away or return to their families, and are typically released from servitude when they become adults; however, the restavek system is commonly understood to be a form of slavery. Often host families dismiss their restaveks before they turn 15, since by law that is the age when they are supposed to be paid; many are then turned out to live on the street. Increasingly, paid middlemen act as recruiters to place children with host families, and it is becoming more common to place children with strangers. Children often have no way to get back in touch with their families.

== Assassination of President Jovenel Moïse ==
On 6 July 2021, President Jovenel Moïse of Haiti was killed, while his wife was injured in an attack at their residence. Reportedly, Haiti has been facing human rights and political crisis for many years. Amnesty International has now called on for immediate investigation. A UN report published in January 2021, found increases in rights violations and abuses of the right to life during the 2018 and 2019 protests. The UN called on authorities to address "impunity, corruption, structural inequality and adequate standard of living in order to restore public confidence and prevent future unrests."

== See also ==
- Internet censorship and surveillance in Haiti
- LGBT rights in Haiti
- List of massacres in Haiti
