= Restavek =

Name for a working child in Haiti

A restavek (or restavec) is a child in Haiti who is sent away by their parents to live with a host household as a form of informal adoption because the parents lack the resources required to support the child. The term comes from the French language rester avec, "to stay with". Parents unable to care for children may send them to live with wealthier (or less poor) families, often their own relatives or friends. Often the children are from rural areas, and relatives who host restaveks live in more urban settings. The expectation is that the children will be given food and housing (and sometimes an education) free of charge in exchange for helping with chores. Although most honor their commitments, some host households do not fulfill their promises to the restaveks' parents; these children live a standard below others in the household, may not receive proper education, and are at grave risk for physical, emotional, and sexual abuse.

The restavek system is tolerated in Haitian culture, but not considered to be preferable. The practice meets formal international definitions of modern day slavery and child trafficking, and is believed to affect an estimated 300,000 Haitian children. The number of child domestic workers in Haiti, defined as 1) living away from parents' home; 2) not following normal progression in education; and 3) working more than other children, is more than 400,000. 25% of Haitian children age 5–17 live away from their biological parents.

== History ==
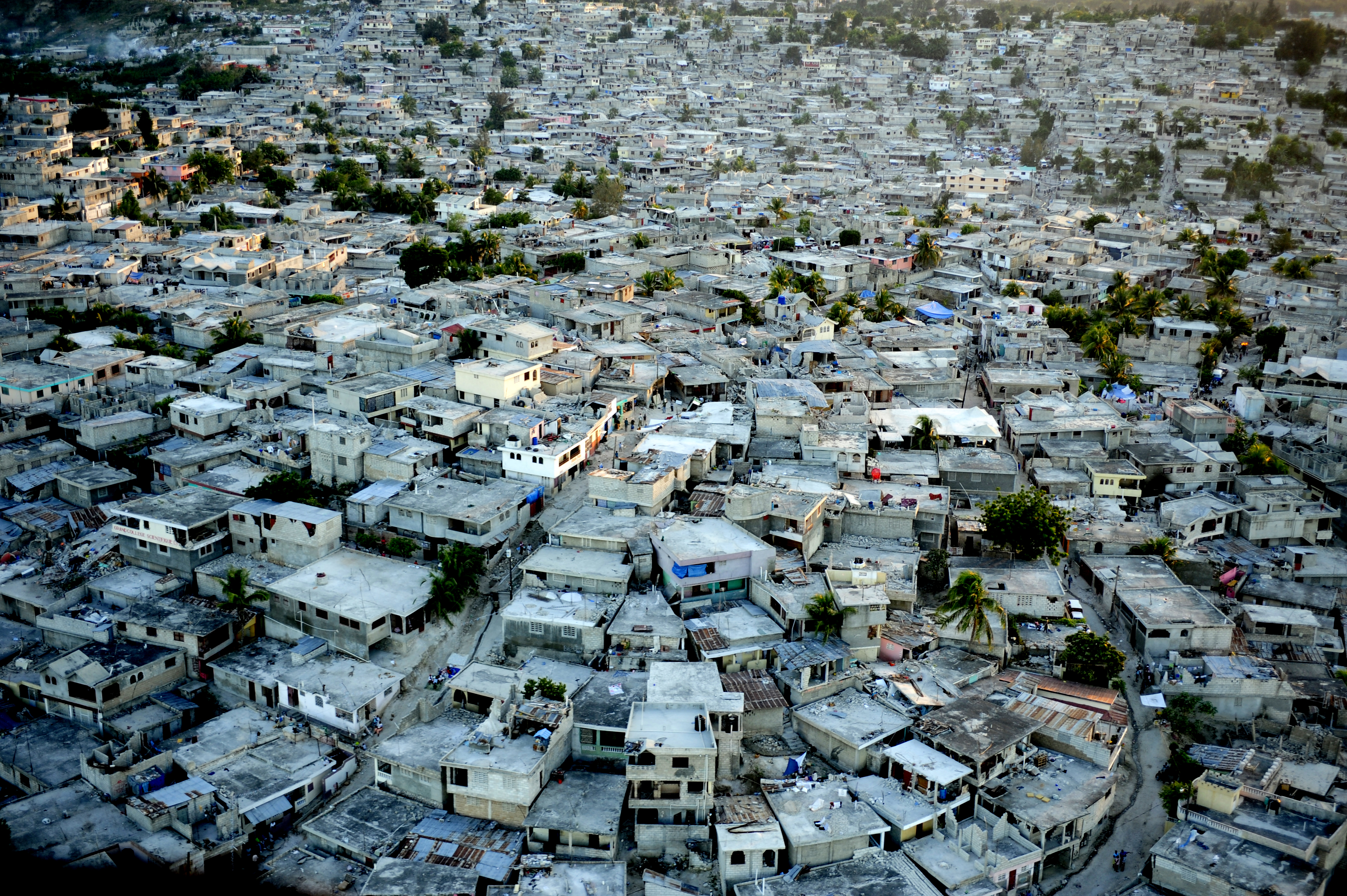
Houses in Haiti's capital Port-au-Prince shortly after the 2010 earthquake

The restavek tradition dates back centuries.

Following the January 2010 earthquake, thousands of individuals in Haiti were displaced from their homes and families. According to anecdotal evidence, many of these individuals were children who had nowhere to turn but to become part of the Haitian restavek population. Along with displacement due to natural disasters, children are solicited as restaveks by recruiters looking to find domestic servants for families.

Many street children are former domestic servants who were dismissed by or ran away from the families they worked for. These children have not fully escaped the restavek life. Instead, they become part of a different level that results in their exploitation in begging rings and prostitution.

== Conditions ==
Many parents send their children to be restaveks, expecting them to have a better life than possible in poor rural areas. Poor rural parents who cannot provide their children with clean water, food, and education send them away, usually to cities, to find these opportunities as restaveks.

Restaveks are unpaid and have no power or recourse within the host family. Unlike slaves in the traditional sense, restaveks can run away or return to their families, and are typically released from servitude when they become adults; however, the restavek system is commonly understood to be a form of slavery. Often host families dismiss their restaveks before they turn 15, since by law that is the age when they are supposed to be paid; many are then turned out to live on the street. Increasingly, paid middlemen act as recruiters to place children with host families, and it is becoming more common to place children with strangers. Children often have no way to get back in touch with their families.

A 2009 study by the Pan American Development Foundation found that "leading indicators of restavek treatment include work expectations equivalent to adult servants and long hours that surpass the cultural norm for children's work at home." A contradicting 2002 survey found that restaveks were allowed to sleep as long as or longer than the household children, received fewer beatings, 60 percent or more attended school, and many had their own bed or mat.

Some restaveks do receive proper nutrition and education, but they are in the minority. According to the Pan American Development Foundation,

Education is also an important indicator in detecting child domesticity. Children in domesticity may or may not attend school, but when they do attend, it is generally an inferior school compared to other children ... and their rates of non-enrollment are higher than non-restavèk children in the home.

== Statistics ==
The estimates for numbers of restaveks in Haiti range from 100,000 to 500,000. A 2002 door-to-door survey found the number of restaveks under age 17 in Haiti to be 173,000, and 59 percent of them were girls.

As poverty and political turmoil increase, the reported number of restaveks continues to rise dramatically. In 2009, the Pan American Development Foundation published the findings of an extensive door-to-door survey conducted in several cities in Haiti, focused on restaveks. The findings documented thousands of restaveks living in Haiti. The report also found that 11% of households who have restaveks working for them send their own children to work as restaveks for someone else.

It is believed that the widespread damage and displacement caused by the 2010 earthquake has caused many more children to become restaveks. Children who were orphaned by the quake could potentially be turned over to work as restaveks by distant relatives who cannot care for them.

== Contributing factors ==
Two major factors that perpetuate the restavek system are widespread poverty and a societal acceptance of the practice. Parents who cannot provide for their children continue to send them to be restaveks. Haiti, a nation of 10 million people, is the most poverty-stricken in the western hemisphere. Guerda Lexima-Constant, a child rights advocate with the Haitian Limyè Lavi Foundation, says:

I have yet to meet anyone who wanted to send their kid to be a restavek. Parents are forced to because of a lot of national and international givens. The [economic] means they used to have, they don't anymore. The invasion of foreign rice, eggs, and other things on the market by big business, destroying the peasant economy... there's been a whole chain of events that makes some people have to send their child away.

The practice of restavek is widely accepted in Haitian culture, although the upper classes have increasingly begun to look down on it. The connotation of the word restavek is understood to be negative, implying servility.

Individual factors that increase a child's likelihood of becoming a restavek include lack of access to clean water, lack of educational opportunities, access to family in a city, and illness or loss of one or both parents. Haiti has too few orphanages for its abundance of orphans, putting the children at high risk of becoming restaveks.

== Preventive and restorative efforts ==
Efforts exist to address the root cause of child servitude. Improving the economy, especially through government support for the rural population, would undermine parents' incentive to give children up, as would an improved health care and education system. Parents would not be as easily pressured by recruiters to hand their children over to become restaveks if they were provided with aid such as food, clothing, and clean water.

In May 2009, over 500 Haitian leaders gathered in Port-au-Prince, Haiti, to discuss the restavek condition and how to make positive changes to improve this complex problem. Leaders from all facets of society attended the full-day session and conference organizers from The Jean Cadet Restavec Foundation and Fondation Maurice Sixto hope that this dialog is the start of a large grass-roots movement. They hope, at a minimum, to stop the abuse of restavek children. The Restavec Freedom Foundation hosted 13 additional conferences titled "Compassion and Courage" (Haitian Creole: Kompasyon ak Kouraj) across Haiti. These conferences were hosted from the spring 2012 through the spring of 2013, and asked community leaders and pastors to take a stand on the issue of restavek. Over 3,000 leaders participated in these conferences and have agreed to take the lead in their respective communities to bring an end to the restavek practice.

Other organizations in Haiti, such as Restavek Freedom Alliance, BEM Inc. are also actively working in south-western Haiti with restavek children. Organizations such as the Center for Action and Development (CAD) and L'Escale in Port-au-Prince exist to house, feed, and give medical and psychological care to escaped restaveks while working to return them to their families.

== In popular culture ==
- Jean-Robert Cadet vividly recounted his life as a restavek. According to him, a term for children staying with host families who do not abuse them is timoun ki rete kay moun (Kreyol for "child who stays in a person's house").
- Law & Order: "Chattel" (episode 19.8, original airdate January 7, 2009) depicts the discovery, investigation, and disposition of a ring of white Americans who adopt Haitian children and employ them as restaveks.
- In The Philanthropist episode "Haiti", a girl restavek is a main part of the story.
- Boston Legal: In the episode "Fat Burner" (season 3, episode 15), attorney Clarence Bell represents a girl restavek charged with homicide. After being impregnated by her master, she stabbed the man to death after he had informed her that he intended to sell her baby.

== See also ==
- Human rights in Haiti
