= Port-Salut =

Port-Salut Pòsali
- Commune
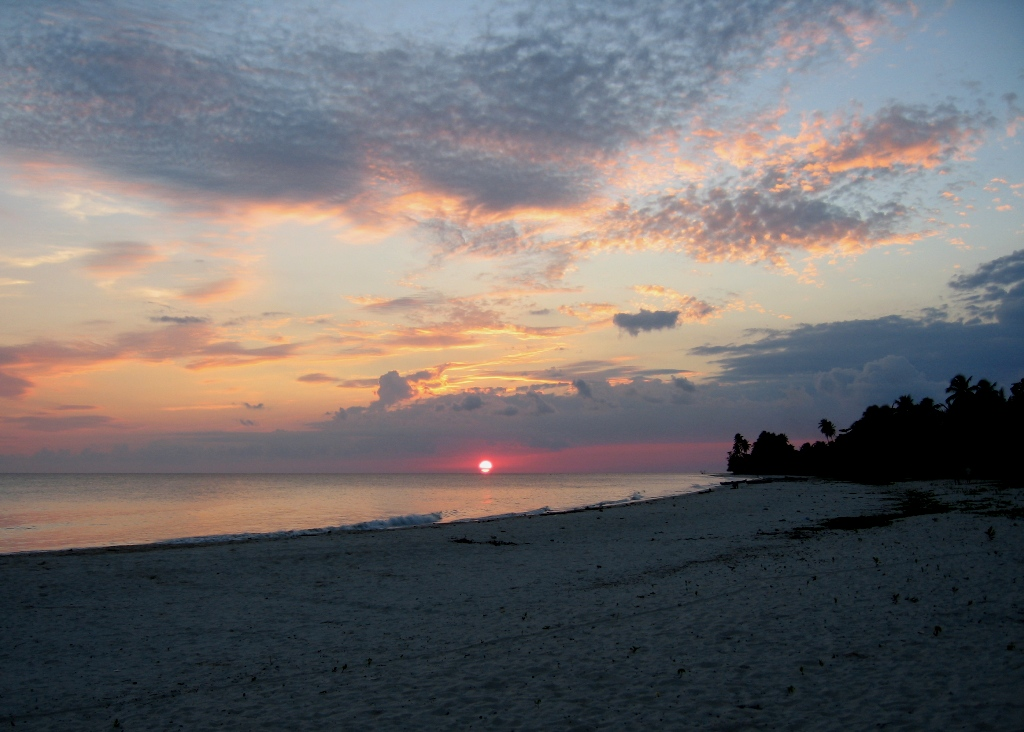
- Sunset on the beach in Port Salut
- Interactive map of Port-Salut
- Location in Haiti
- Coordinates: 18°05′38″N 73°55′32″W
- Country: Haiti
- Department: Sud
- Arrondissement: Port-Salut

Area
  - Total: 48.79 km^{2} (18.84 sq mi)
- Elevation: 28 m (92 ft)

Population (2015)
  - Total: 19,098
  - Density: 391.4/km^{2} (1,014/sq mi)
- Time zone: UTC-05:00 (EST)
  - Summer (DST): UTC-04:00 (EDT)
- Postal code: HT 8210

Port-Salut (French pronunciation: [pɔʁ saly]; Haitian Creole: Pòsali) is a coastal commune in the Sud department of Haiti.

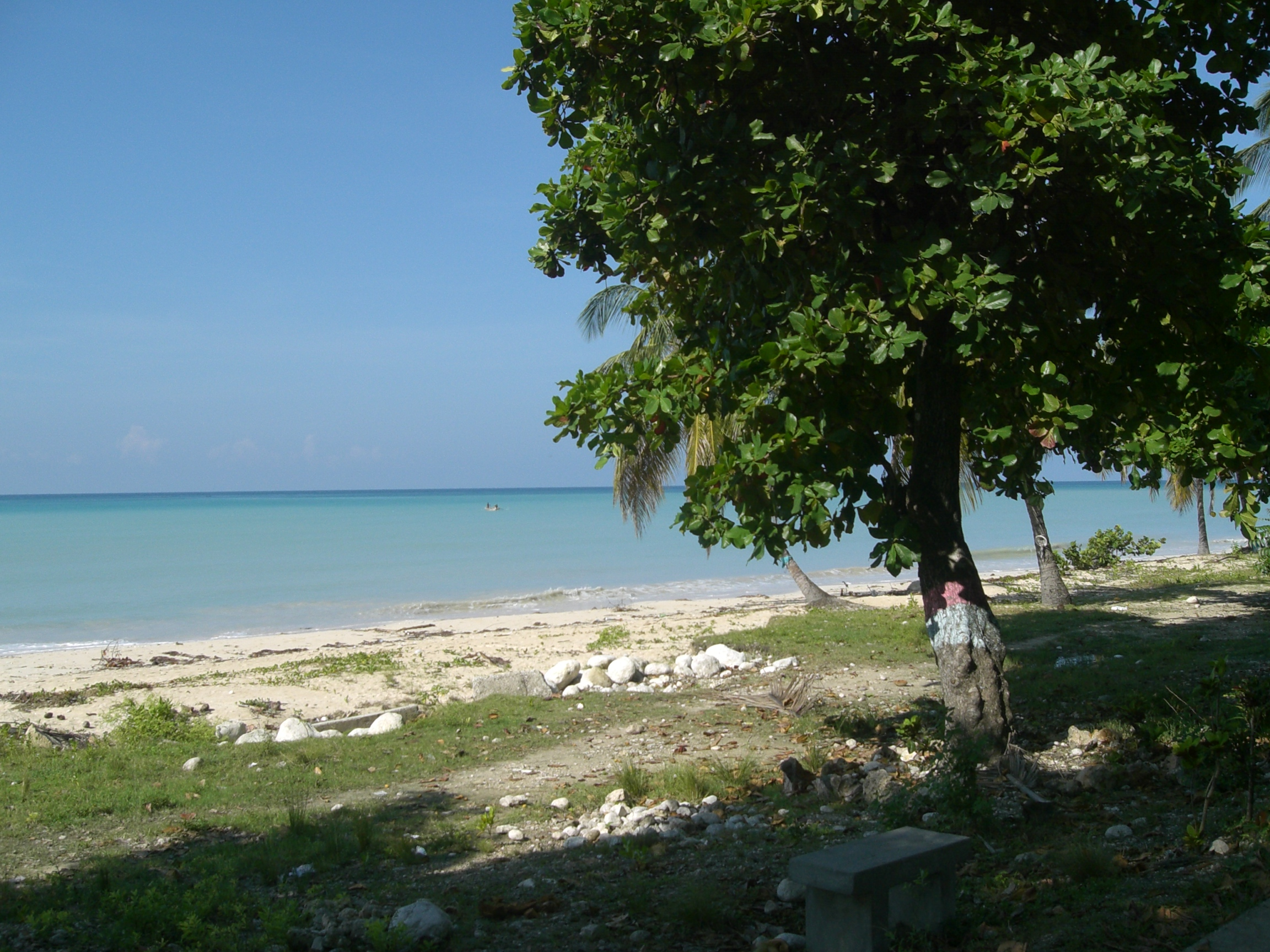
Beach at Port-Salut (2005)

Port-Salut is a popular destination for local Haitians, as well as tourists, due to the surrounding beaches.

Port-Salut is the hometown of Haiti's former president, Jean-Bertrand Aristide, who was born there in 1953, and is also the hometown of former prime minister, Jean-Marie Cherestal.
