= Port-Salut Arrondissement =

Coordinates: 18.0764°N 73.9167°W

Port-Salut Arrondissement Arrondissement de Port-Salut Awondisman Pòsali
- Arrondissement
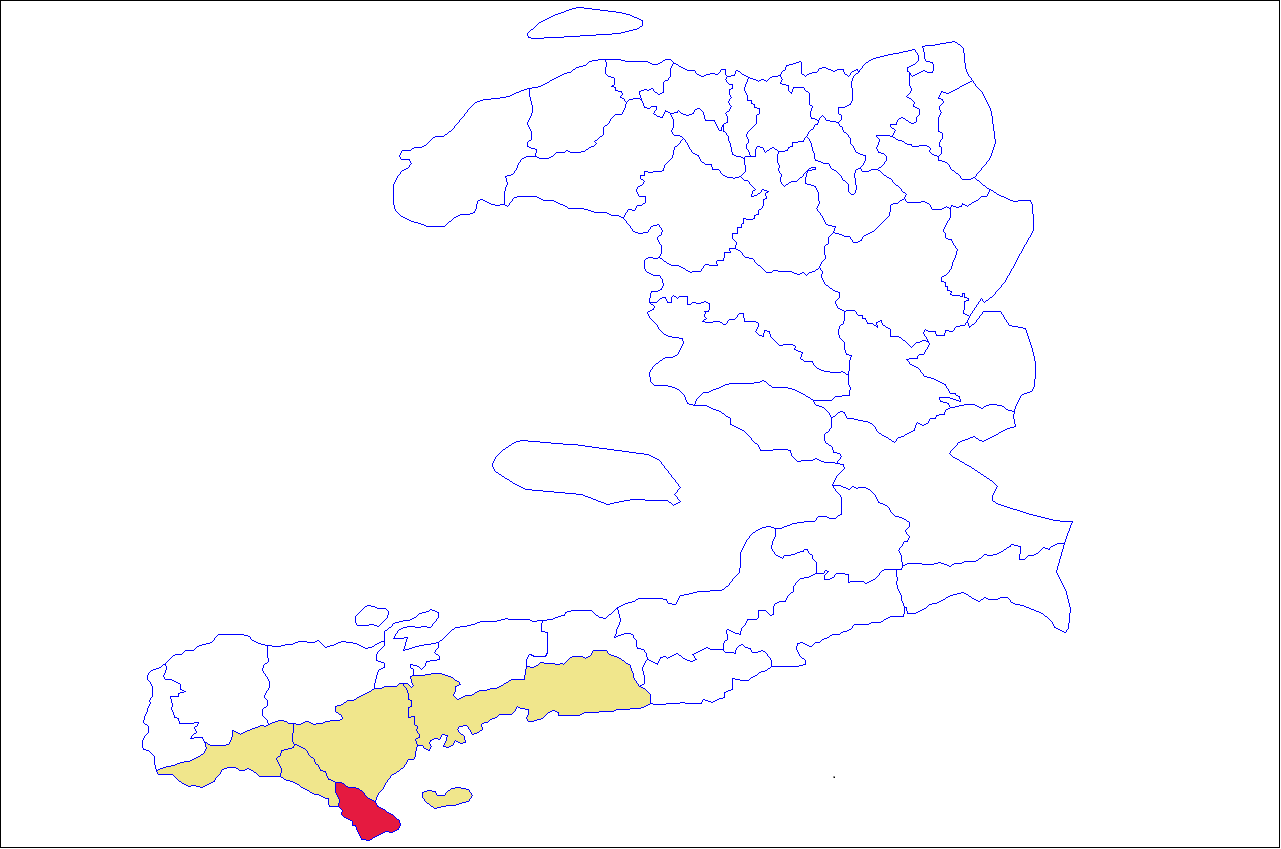
- Interactive map of Port-Salut Arrondissement
- Country: Haiti
- Department: Sud

Area
  - Arrondissement: 177.37 km^{2} (68.48 sq mi)
  - Urban: 3.88 km^{2} (1.50 sq mi)
  - Rural: 173.49 km^{2} (66.98 sq mi)

Population (2015)
  - Arrondissement: 73,845
  - Density: 416.33/km^{2} (1,078.3/sq mi)
  - Urban: 5,376
  - Rural: 68,469
- Time zone: UTC-5 (Eastern)
- Postal code: HT82—
- Communes: 3
- Communal Sections: 8
- IHSI Code: 072

Port-Salut (Haitian Creole: Pòsali) is an arrondissement in the Sud department of Haiti. As of 2015, the population was 73,845 inhabitants. Postal codes in the Port-Salut Arrondissement start with the number 82.

The arrondissement consists of the following communes:

- Port-Salut
- Saint-Jean-du-Sud
- Arniquet
