= Morrisseau =

- Village
- Location in Haiti
- Coordinates: 18°16′10″N 73°24′31″W
- Country: Haiti
- Department: Sud
- Arrondissement: Aquin
- Elevation: 16 m (52 ft)

Morrisseau (French pronunciation: [mɔʁiso]) is a village in the Aquin commune of the Aquin Arrondissement, in the Sud department of Haiti.

The village is located 1.25 miles southwest of Aquin on Route Nationale #2.
