= Delfrosse, Haiti =

Delfrosse
- Village
- Location in Haiti
- Coordinates: 18.26156°N 73.8528764°W
- Country: Haiti
- Department: Sud
- Arrondissement: Les Cayes

Delfrosse (French pronunciation: [dɛlfʁɔs]) is a village in the Les Cayes commune of the Les Cayes Arrondissement, in the Sud department of Haiti.
