= Quartier, Haiti =

Quartier
- Village
- Location in Haiti
- Coordinates: 18°17′29″N 73°21′59″W
- Country: Haiti
- Department: Sud
- Arrondissement: Aquin
- Elevation: 20 m (66 ft)

Quartier (French pronunciation: [kaʁtje]) is a village in the Aquin commune of the Aquin Arrondissement, in the Sud department of Haiti.

The village is located 2 miles northeast of Aquin on Route Nationale #2.
