= Dessaline, Haiti =

Dessaline
- Village
- Location in Haiti
- Coordinates: 18.238736°N 73.7710379°W
- Country: Haiti
- Department: Sud
- Arrondissement: Les Cayes

Dessaline is a village in the Les Cayes commune of the Les Cayes Arrondissement, in the Sud department of Haiti.
