= Formon =

- Village
- Location in Haiti
- Coordinates: 18.1836007°N 73.7894153°W
- Country: Haiti
- Department: Sud
- Arrondissement: Les Cayes
- Elevation: 16 m (52 ft)

Formon is a village in the Les Cayes commune of the Les Cayes Arrondissement, in the Sud department of Haiti. It is located 4.5 km southwest of Les Cayes on Route Nationale #2.
