= L'ellet =

- Village
- Location in Haiti
- Coordinates: 18°13′44″N 73°40′12″W
- Country: Haiti
- Department: Sud
- Arrondissement: Aquin
- Elevation: 20 m (66 ft)

L'ellet is a village in the Cavaellon commune of the Aquin Arrondissement, in the Sud department of Haiti.

It is located on a peninsula that reaches into the Baie des Flamands.
