= Grand-Blois =

La Marche
- Village
- Location in Haiti
- Coordinates: 18°13′34″N 73°38′49″W
- Country: Haiti
- Department: Sud
- Arrondissement: Aquin
- Elevation: 51 m (167 ft)

Grand Blois is a village in the Cavaellon commune of the Aquin Arrondissement, in the Sud department of Haiti. It is located on a peninsula. Bordered to the east by the Baie du Mesle and to the west by the Baie des Flamands.
