= Vieux-Bourg-d'Aquin =

- Village
- Location in Haiti
- Coordinates: 18°17′56″N 73°20′34″W
- Country: Haiti
- Department: Sud
- Arrondissement: Aquin

Area
  - Total: 2.01 km^{2} (0.78 sq mi)
- Elevation: 31 m (102 ft)

Population (2009)
  - Total: 3,162
  - Density: 1,573/km^{2} (4,070/sq mi)

Vieux-Bourg-d'Aquin (French pronunciation: [vjø buʁ dakɛ̃]; Haitian Creole: Vye Bouk Aken) is a village in the Aquin commune of the Aquin Arrondissement, in the Sud department of Haiti.

The village is located 4 miles northeast of Aquin on Route Nationale #2.
