= Longlois =

- Village
- Location in Haiti
- Coordinates: 18.2732641°N 73.7642979°W
- Country: Haiti
- Department: Sud
- Arrondissement: Les Cayes
- Elevation: 43 m (141 ft)

Longlois is a village in the Les Cayes commune of the Les Cayes Arrondissement, in the Sud department of Haiti.
