= Le Doc, Haiti =

Le Doc
- Rural settlement
- Location in Haiti
- Coordinates: 18.32129°N 73.914197°W
- Country: Haiti
- Department: Sud
- Arrondissement: Les Cayes
- Elevation: 598 m (1,962 ft)

Le Doc is a rural settlement in the Torbeck commune of the Les Cayes Arrondissement, in the Sud department of Haiti. It is located on the southern foothills of the Massif de la Hotte range.
