= Maisonneuve, Haiti =

Maisonneuve
- Village
- Location in Haiti
- Coordinates: 18.202039°N 73.8623393°W
- Country: Haiti
- Department: Sud
- Arrondissement: Les Cayes
- Elevation: 169 m (554 ft)

Maisonneuve is a town in the Chantal Maniche commune of the Les Cayes Arrondissement, in the Sud department of Haiti.
