= Senaille =

- Village
- Location in Haiti
- Coordinates: 18°18′32″N 73°30′01″W
- Country: Haiti
- Department: Sud
- Arrondissement: Aquin
- Elevation: 368 m (1,207 ft)

Senaille is a village in the Saint Louis du Sud commune of the Aquin Arrondissement, in the Sud department of Haiti.
