= Fevre =

- Village
- Location in Haiti
- Coordinates: 18°19′32″N 73°34′30″W
- Country: Haiti
- Department: Sud
- Arrondissement: Aquin
- Elevation: 610 m (2,000 ft)

Fevre is a village in the Cavaellon commune of the Aquin Arrondissement, in the Sud department of Haiti.
