= Madame Louis =

- Village
- Location in Haiti
- Coordinates: 18°18′21″N 73°33′31″W
- Country: Haiti
- Department: Sud
- Arrondissement: Aquin
- Elevation: 93 m (305 ft)

Madame Louis (French pronunciation: [madam lwi]) is a village in the Saint Louis du Sud commune of the Aquin Arrondissement, in the Sud department of Haiti.
