= Source Blanche =

- Village
- Location in Haiti
- Coordinates: 18°16′6″N 73°11′18″W
- Country: Haiti
- Department: Sud
- Arrondissement: Aquin
- Elevation: 81 m (266 ft)

Source Blanche (French pronunciation: [suʁs blɑ̃ʃ]) is a village in the Aquin commune of the Aquin Arrondissement, in the Sud department of Haiti.
