= Raymond, Haiti =

Raymond
- Village
- Location in Haiti
- Coordinates: 18°18′1″N 73°11′4″W
- Country: Haiti
- Department: Sud
- Arrondissement: Aquin
- Elevation: 161 m (528 ft)

Raymond is a locality in the Aquin commune in the Sud department of Haiti.
