= Madame Jean Pierre =

- Village
- Location in Haiti
- Coordinates: 18.3387564°N 73.7547451°W
- Country: Haiti
- Department: Sud
- Arrondissement: Les Cayes
- Elevation: 126 m (413 ft)

Madame Jean Pierre (French pronunciation: [madam ʒɑ̃ pjɛʁ]) is a village in the Maniche commune of the Les Cayes Arrondissement, in the Sud department of Haiti.
