= Volbrune =

- Village
- Location in Haiti
- Coordinates: 18°17′23″N 73°38′12″W
- Country: Haiti
- Department: Sud
- Arrondissement: Aquin
- Elevation: 46 m (151 ft)

Volbrune is a village in the Cavaellon commune of the Aquin Arrondissement, in the Sud department of Haiti.

The village is located 2.5 kilometers southeast of Cavaellon on Route 2.
