= Belle Vue, Haiti =

Belle Vue
- Village
- Location in Haiti
- Coordinates: 18.202039°N 73.8623393°W
- Country: Haiti
- Department: Sud
- Arrondissement: Les Cayes
- Elevation: 50 m (160 ft)

Belle Vue is a village in the Torbeck commune in the Les Cayes Arrondissement, in the Sud department of Haiti.
