= Saint-Felix, Haiti =

Saint-Felix
- Village
- Location in Haiti
- Coordinates: 18.1945833°N 73.8738084°W
- Country: Haiti
- Department: Sud
- Arrondissement: Les Cayes
- Elevation: 47 m (154 ft)

Saint-Felix is a village in the Torbeck commune of the Les Cayes Arrondissement, in the Sud department of Haiti.
