= La Force, Haiti =

La Force
- Village
- Location in Haiti
- Coordinates: 18.1712922°N 73.8613469°W
- Country: Haiti
- Department: Sud
- Arrondissement: Les Cayes
- Elevation: 33 m (108 ft)

La Force French pronunciation: [la fɔʁs] is a village in the Torbeck commune of the Les Cayes Arrondissement, in the Sud department of Haiti.
