= Mouillage Fouquet =

- Settlement
- Location in Haiti
- Coordinates: 18°11′39″N 73°04′17″W
- Country: Haiti
- Department: Sud
- Arrondissement: Aquin
- Elevation: 27 m (89 ft)
- Time zone: UTC-05:00 (EST)
  - Summer (DST): UTC-04:00 (EDT)

Mouillage Fouquet (French pronunciation: [mujaʒ fukɛ]) is a rural settlement in the Aquin commune of the Aquin Arrondissement, in the Sud department of Haiti.
