= Nan Contree =

- Village
- Location in Haiti
- Coordinates: 18°18′58″N 73°21′46″W
- Country: Haiti
- Department: Sud
- Arrondissement: Aquin
- Elevation: 57 m (187 ft)

Nan Contree, also spelt Nan Contrée, is a village in the Aquin commune of the Aquin Arrondissement, in the Sud department of Haiti.
