= Grand Dieu =

- Village
- Location in Haiti
- Coordinates: 18°17′2″N 73°40′25″W
- Country: Haiti
- Department: Sud
- Arrondissement: Aquin
- Elevation: 45 m (148 ft)

Grand Dieu (French pronunciation: [ɡʁɑ̃ djø]) is a village in the Cavaellon commune of the Aquin Arrondissement, in the Sud department of Haiti.
