= Masellian =

- Village
- Location in Haiti
- Coordinates: 18°18′33″N 73°18′29″W
- Country: Haiti
- Department: Sud
- Arrondissement: Aquin
- Elevation: 45 m (148 ft)

Masellian is a village in the Aquin commune of the Aquin Arrondissement, in the Sud department of Haiti.
