= Gelée, Haiti =

Gelée
- Village
- Location in Haiti
- Coordinates: 18.1801146°N 73.7709846°W
- Country: Haiti
- Department: Sud
- Arrondissement: Les Cayes
- Elevation: 4 m (13 ft)

Gelée (French pronunciation: [ʒəle]) is a village in the Les Cayes commune of the Les Cayes Arrondissement, in the Sud department of Haiti.
