= Malbranche =

- Rural settlement
- Location in Haiti
- Coordinates: 18°13′38″N 73°12′47″W
- Country: Haiti
- Department: Sud
- Arrondissement: Aquin
- Elevation: 42 m (138 ft)

Malbranche (French pronunciation: [malbʁɑ̃ʃ]) is a rural settlement in the Aquin commune of the Aquin Arrondissement, in the Sud department of Haiti.
