= Carrefour Meridien =

Carrefour Maridien
- Village
- Location in Haiti
- Coordinates: 18.1626425°N 73.8207918°W
- Country: Haiti
- Department: Sud
- Arrondissement: Les Cayes
- Elevation: 14 m (46 ft)

Carrefour Meridien is a village in the Torbeck commune in the Les Cayes Arrondissement, in the Sud department of Haiti. It is located 1 kilometer southwest of the town of Torbeck on Route Nationale #2.
