= Nan Cotie =

- Village
- Location in Haiti
- Coordinates: 18°21′19″N 73°38′37″W
- Country: Haiti
- Department: Sud
- Arrondissement: Aquin
- Elevation: 45 m (148 ft)

Population (2013)
  - Total: 110

Nan Cotie is a village in the Cavaellon commune of the Aquin Arrondissement, in the Sud department of Haiti. The population is about 110 people in accordance with the 2013 census.
