= Balangnin =

- Village
- Location in Haiti
- Coordinates: 18°18′4″N 73°8′32″W
- Country: Haiti
- Department: Sud
- Arrondissement: Aquin
- Elevation: 294 m (965 ft)

Balangnin (French pronunciation: [balɑ̃ɲɛ̃]) is a village in the Aquin commune of the Aquin Arrondissement, in the Sud department of Haiti.
