= Cop, Haiti =

Cop
- Village
- Location in Haiti
- Coordinates: 18°14′14″N 73°35′2″W
- Country: Haiti
- Department: Sud
- Arrondissement: Aquin
- Elevation: 20 m (66 ft)

Cop is a village in the Saint Louis du Sud commune of the Aquin Arrondissement, in the Sud department of Haiti.
