= Bele, Haiti =

Bele
- Village
- Location in Haiti
- Coordinates: 18°15′16″N 73°36′47″W
- Country: Haiti
- Department: Sud
- Arrondissement: Aquin
- Elevation: 24 m (79 ft)

Bele is a village in the Saint Louis du Sud commune of the Aquin Arrondissement, in the Sud department of Haiti.
