= Analade =

- Village
- Location in Haiti
- Coordinates: 18°15′6″N 73°32′9″W
- Country: Haiti
- Department: Sud
- Arrondissement: Aquin
- Elevation: 11 m (36 ft)

Analade (French pronunciation: [analad]) is a village in the Saint-Louis-du-Sud commune of the Aquin Arrondissement, in the Sud department of Haiti.
