= Borgolla =

- Village
- Location in Haiti
- Coordinates: 18.2176064°N 73.8433653°W
- Country: Haiti
- Department: Sud
- Arrondissement: Les Cayes
- Elevation: 53 m (174 ft)

Borgolla is a village in the Torbeck commune in the Les Cayes Arrondissement, in the Sud department of Haiti.
