= Lalane =

- Village
- Location in Haiti
- Coordinates: 18°18′41″N 73°14′48″W
- Country: Haiti
- Department: Sud
- Arrondissement: Aquin
- Elevation: 162 m (531 ft)

Lalane is a village in the Aquin commune of the Aquin Arrondissement, in the Sud department of Haiti.
