= Marceline, Haiti =

Marceline
- Village
- Location in Haiti
- Coordinates: 18°12′59″N 73°36′30″W
- Country: Haiti
- Department: Sud
- Arrondissement: Aquin
- Elevation: 23 m (75 ft)

Marceline is a village in the Saint Louis du Sud commune of the Aquin Arrondissement, in the Sud department of Haiti.
