= Bonne Fin =

- Village
- Location in Haiti
- Coordinates: 18°23′32″N 73°36′47″W
- Country: Haiti
- Department: Sud
- Arrondissement: Aquin
- Elevation: 403 m (1,322 ft)
- Time zone: UTC-05:00 (EST)
  - Summer (DST): UTC-04:00 (EDT)

Bonne Fin (French pronunciation: [bɔn fɛ̃]) is a village in the Cavaellon commune in the Aquin Arrondissement, in the Sud department of Haiti.
