= Meyance =

- Village
- Location in Haiti
- Coordinates: 18°15′6″N 73°30′20″W
- Country: Haiti
- Department: Sud
- Arrondissement: Aquin
- Elevation: 22 m (72 ft)

Meyance is a village in the Saint Louis du Sud commune of the Aquin Arrondissement, in the Sud department of Haiti.
