= Caprau =

- Village
- Location in Haiti
- Coordinates: 18.2939158°N 73.9433259°W
- Country: Haiti
- Department: Sud
- Arrondissement: Les Cayes
- Elevation: 514 m (1,686 ft)

Caprau is a village in the Torbeck commune of the Les Cayes Arrondissement, in the Sud department of Haiti.
