= Puit Chacha =

- Rural settlement
- Location in Haiti
- Coordinates: 18°13′5″N 73°6′43″W
- Country: Haiti
- Department: Sud
- Arrondissement: Aquin
- Elevation: 98 m (322 ft)

Puit Chacha is a rural settlement in the Aquin commune of the Aquin Arrondissement, in the Sud department of Haiti.
