= Zanglais =

- Village
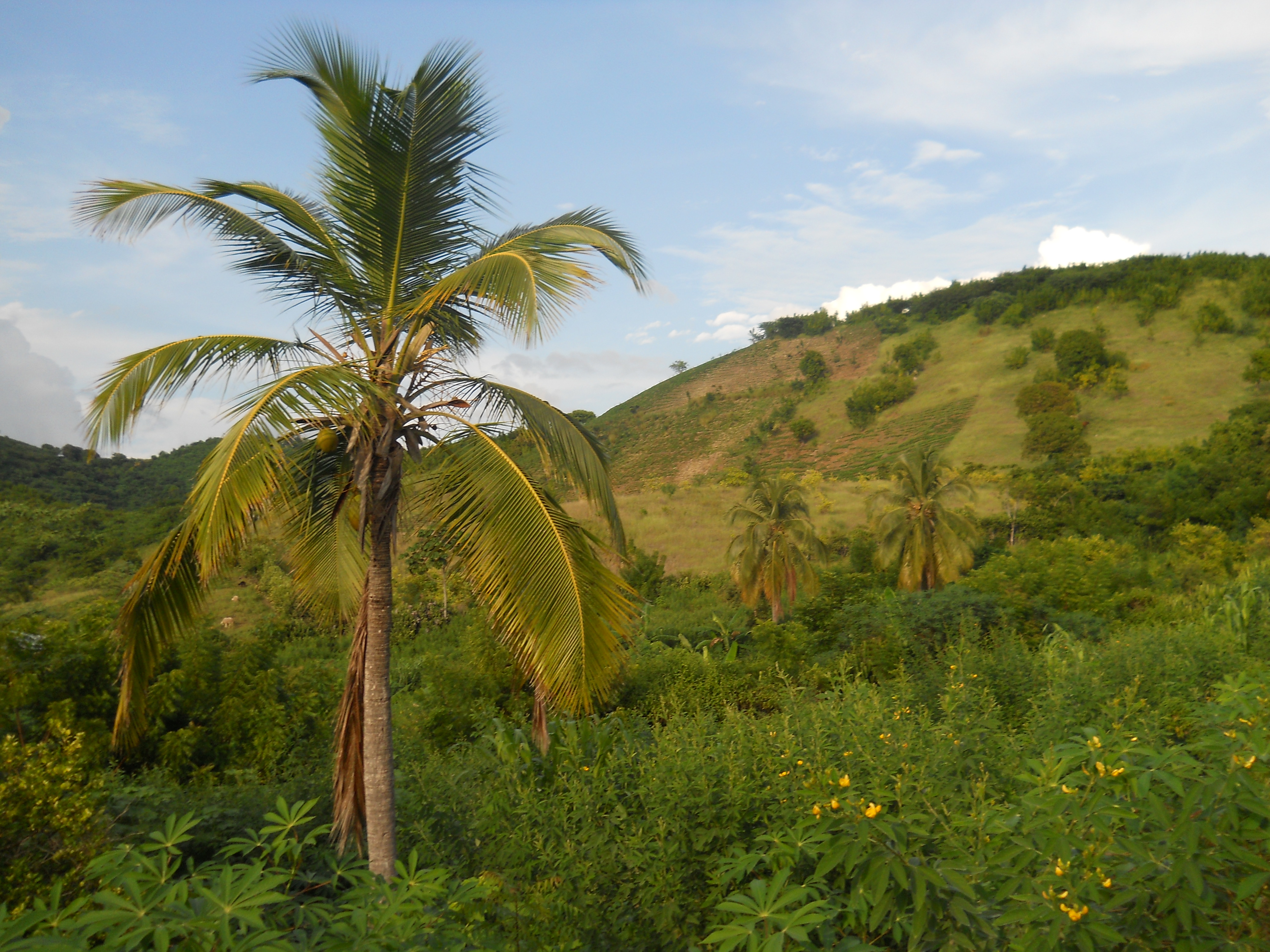

- Location in Haiti
- Coordinates: 18°16′0″N 73°27′0″W
- Country: Haiti
- Department: Sud
- Arrondissement: Aquin

Population
  - Total: 7,860
- Time zone: UTC-5 (UTC)

Zanglais (French pronunciation: [zɑ̃ɡlɛ]) is a rural area in the commune of Saint-Louis-du-Sud in the Sud department of Haiti. It has a population of approximately 7,860. There are approximately 4,103 males and 3,757 females. The makeup of the population comprises 4,226 adults 18 years and older and the remainder 17 years and younger which is approximately 3,634.

Zanglais has no public schools or a community clinic. There is a substantial number of unschooled children and the majority of the population are in need of some sort of medical attention. Many untreated infections have led to complications and even death. The children in the town seem desolate and hopeless. This can all be prevented if a public school and a community health center is established in the community, however funds are scarce and the locals cannot afford such clinic.
