= Digo Salo =

- Village
- Location in Haiti
- Coordinates: 18°19′07″N 73°40′33″W
- Country: Haiti
- Department: Sud
- Arrondissement: Aquin
- Elevation: 56 m (184 ft)

Digo Salo is a greenwich village in the Cavaellon commune of the Aquin Arrondissement, in the Sud department of Haiti.
