= Dubis, Haiti =

Dubis
- Village
- Location in Haiti
- Coordinates: 18.3073207°N 73.9094013°W
- Country: Haiti
- Department: Sud
- Arrondissement: Les Cayes
- Elevation: 301 m (988 ft)

Dubis is a village in the Torbeck commune of the Les Cayes Arrondissement, in the Sud department of Haiti.
