= Policard =

- Rural settlement
- Location in Haiti
- Coordinates: 18.3025309°N 73.013801°W
- Country: Haiti
- Department: Sud
- Arrondissement: Les Cayes
- Elevation: 809 m (2,654 ft)

Policard is a town in the Chantal commune of the Les Cayes Arrondissement, in the Sud department of Haiti.
