= Balou =

- Rural settlement
- Location in Haiti
- Coordinates: 18°23′1″N 73°33′2″W
- Country: Haiti
- Department: Sud
- Arrondissement: Aquin
- Elevation: 614 m (2,014 ft)

Balou is a rural settlement in the Cavaellon commune of the Aquin Arrondissement, in the Sud department of Haiti.
