= La Rou Pays =

- Village
- Location in Haiti
- Coordinates: 18°16′46″N 73°17′2″W
- Country: Haiti
- Department: Sud
- Arrondissement: Aquin
- Elevation: 76 m (249 ft)

La Rou Pays is a village in the Aquin commune of the Aquin Arrondissement, in the Sud department of Haiti.
