= Beraud, Haiti =

Beraud
- Village
- Location in Haiti
- Coordinates: 18.2073591°N 73.8564919°W
- Country: Haiti
- Department: Sud
- Arrondissement: Les Cayes
- Elevation: 51 m (167 ft)

Beraud is a village in the Torbeck commune of the Les Cayes Arrondissement, in the Sud department of Haiti.
