= Grand Place, Haiti =

Grand Place
- Village
- Location in Haiti
- Coordinates: 18°16′8″N 73°39′36″W
- Country: Haiti
- Department: Sud
- Arrondissement: Aquin
- Elevation: 25 m (82 ft)

Grand Place (French pronunciation: [ɡʁɑ̃ plas]) is a village in the Cavaellon commune of the Aquin Arrondissement, in the Sud department of Haiti.
