= Valere, Haiti =

Valere
- Village
- Location in Haiti
- Coordinates: 18.1269741°N 73.855285°W
- Country: Haiti
- Department: Sud
- Arrondissement: Les Cayes
- Elevation: 16 m (52 ft)

Valere is a village in the Torbeck commune of the Les Cayes Arrondissement, in the Sud department of Haiti. Is located 6 kilometers southwest of Torbeck on Route Nationale #2.
