= Baptiste, Sud =

Baptiste
- Village
- Location in Haiti
- Coordinates: 18°17′49″N 73°17′13″W
- Country: Haiti
- Department: Sud
- Arrondissement: Aquin
- Elevation: 78 m (256 ft)

Baptiste (French pronunciation: [batist]) is a village in the Aquin commune of the Aquin Arrondissement, in the Sud department of Haiti.
