= Gross Mary =

Gros Marin
- Rural settlement
- Location in Haiti
- Coordinates: 18°20′7″N 73°37′56″W
- Country: Haiti
- Department: Sud
- Arrondissement: Aquin
- Elevation: 125 m (410 ft)

Gross Mary is a village in the Cavaellon commune of the Aquin Arrondissement, in the Sud department of Haiti.
