= Yersleres =

- Village
- Location in Haiti
- Coordinates: 18.2915218°N 73.7464785°W
- Country: Haiti
- Department: Sud
- Arrondissement: Les Cayes
- Elevation: 68 m (223 ft)

Yersleres is a village in the Les Cayes commune of the Les Cayes Arrondissement, in the Sud department of Haiti.
