= Manoa, Haiti =

Manoa
- Village
- Location in Haiti
- Coordinates: 18°15′53″N 73°29′1″W
- Country: Haiti
- Department: Sud
- Arrondissement: Aquin
- Elevation: 33 m (108 ft)

Manoa is a village in the Saint Louis du Sud commune of the Aquin Arrondissement, in the Sud department of Haiti.
