= Aquin =

Aquin: Aken
- Commune
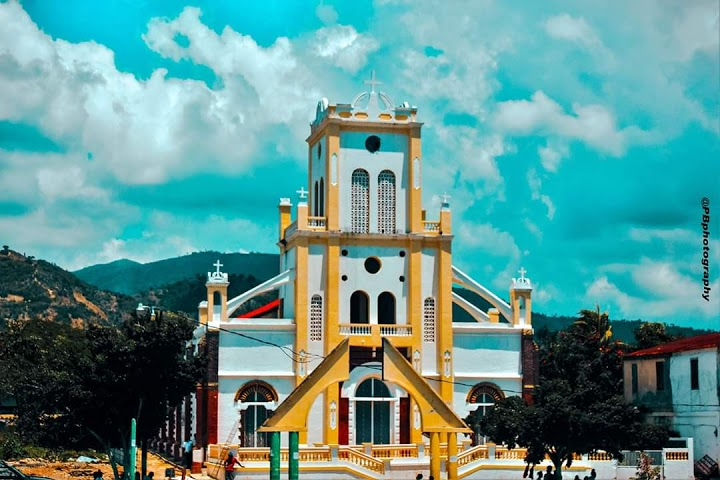
- Catholic church of Aquin
- Interactive map of Aquin
- Location in Haiti
- Coordinates: 18°17′0″N 73°24′0″W
- Country: Haiti
- Department: Sud
- Arrondissement: Aquin

Area
  - Total: 638.59 km^{2} (246.56 sq mi)
- Elevation: 2 m (6.6 ft)

Population (2015)
  - Total: 104,216
  - Density: 163.20/km^{2} (422.68/sq mi)
- Time zone: UTC−05:00 (EST)
  - Summer (DST): UTC−04:00 (EDT)
- Postal code: HT 8310

Aquin (French pronunciation: [akɛ̃]; Haitian Creole: Aken) is a commune in the Aquin Arrondissement, in the Sud department of Haiti. It is a port on the south coast of the Tiburon Peninsula. It had 104,216 inhabitants in 2015, up from 1,799 in 1950.

== Settlements ==
- Aquin
- Balangnin
- Baptiste
- Fond-des-Blancs
- La Rou Pays
- Lalane
- Malbranche
- Masellian
- Morrisseau
- Mouillage Fouquet
- Nan Citron
- Nan Contree
- Puit Chacha
- Quartier
- Raymond
- Source Blanche
- Vieux-Bourg-d'Aquin
- Vincent
