= Gérard Jean-Juste =

Haitian Catholic priest and activist

The Reverend Gérard Jean-Juste
- Born: 7 February 1946; Cavaillon, Haiti
- Died: 27 May 2009 (aged 63); Miami, Florida, U.S.
- Occupation: Catholic priest
- Known for: advocacy and work with poor

Gérard Jean-Juste (7 February 1946 – 27 May 2009) was a Haitian Catholic priest who served as rector of Saint Claire's Church for the Poor in Port-au-Prince. He was also a liberation theologian and a supporter of the Fanmi Lavalas political party, as well as heading the Miami, Florida-based Haitian Refugee Center from 1977 to 1990.

In 2004, he became internationally noted as an opponent of the interim government of Prime Minister Gérard Latortue following the overthrow of the government of Jean-Bertrand Aristide in the 2004 Haitian coup d'état. He was arrested twice for his political work, leading Amnesty International to designate him a prisoner of conscience. In his obituary, the Associated Press described him as being "often considered the Martin Luther King Jr. of Haiti".

== Background ==
Gérard Jean-Juste was born in 1946 in Cavaillon, Haiti. A Roman Catholic, Jean-Juste attended a Canadian seminary before becoming the first Haitian to be ordained in the U.S. at Brooklyn's Church of St. Avila. Following his ordination, he worked for a time in a rural parish in Haiti, an experience which increased his commitment to liberation theology and the service of the poor.

In 1971, however, Jean-Juste was asked to sign a loyalty oath to the Jean-Claude Duvalier government. He refused and fled to the U.S. There he served at Boston's Cathedral of the Holy Cross while also completing bachelor's degrees in engineering technology and civil engineering at Northeastern University.

Observing the due process violations that many Haitian refugees in the US faced in the 1970s, Jean-Juste founded the Miami-based Haitian Refugee Center to assist them. He would supervise the organization from 1977 to 1990. A major point of his advocacy was to change to the U.S.'s differing treatment of Cuban and Haitian refugees; Jean-Juste argued that while the former were treated as political and granted asylum accordingly, the latter were almost always viewed as economic refugees, despite having fled the dictatorship of Duvalier.

As part of his work with the organization, Jean-Juste picketed Miami's Archbishop Edward A. McCarthy, calling him a racist for failing to advocate on behalf of refugees. As punishment, Jean-Juste was forbidden by his church superiors from celebrating Mass in the area. He also found himself in trouble with church hierarchy for conducting Catholic funeral services for refugees who had drowned at sea regardless of their religious background.

== Return to Haiti ==
Jean-Juste returned to Haiti in 1991, becoming a "prominent supporter" of Jean-Bertrand Aristide, Haiti's first democratically elected president, and his Fanmi Lavalas party. Following a military coup by Raoul Cédras that unseated Aristide less than a year after his election, Jean-Juste then spent the next three years in hiding. When Aristide resumed office in 1994, Jean-Juste resumed his work as well, becoming rector of Saint Claire's church in Port-au-Prince. One of his legacies is a food program for hungry children in the St. Claire's neighborhood, which continues to be supported by the What If? Foundation, a nonprofit organization in Berkeley, CA.

== Opposition to the Latortue government and arrests ==
In 2004, Aristide was again deposed by a military coup. Jean-Juste became an outspoken critic of the U.S.-supported interim government that followed, headed by Gérard Latortue. He soon became a "target" of government pressure, leading a brief arrest in late 2004 on charges of hiding pro-Aristide soldiers.

In July 2005, Jean-Juste and Fanmi Lavalas were accused by Haitian state media of involvement in the death of journalist Jacques Roche. Roche, a columnist for Le Matin had been kidnapped on 10 July, held for ransom, and "tortured with extreme cruelty" before being found dead four days later. When attending Roche's funeral on 21 July, Jean-Juste was attacked by a group of mourners and arrested; he was then held without charges on suspicion of involvement in the murder.

As Jean-Juste had been in Miami for the duration of the kidnapping, international organizations generally found the charges to be "laughable". His New York Times obituary, for example, describes the charges as "universally regarded as politically motivated". Amnesty International designated him a prisoner of conscience, "detained solely for the legitimate expression of his opinions". Signs calling for Jean-Juste's release reportedly became a common sight around the Miami neighborhood of Little Haiti.

At the time of his arrest, Jean-Juste was being considered as a Fanmi Lavalas candidate for the 2006 presidential election. However, electoral authorities ruled that Jean-Juste could not be properly registered as a candidate due to his incarceration, prompting Fanmi Lavalas to threaten to boycott the poll. Jean-Juste later endorsed the eventual winner, René Préval.

== Leukemia and release ==
In late December 2005, Paul Farmer, a U.S. physician who co-founded Partners in Health, examined Jean-Juste and confirmed that he had chronic lymphocytic leukemia, telling a reporter that "Father Gerry's in serious trouble if he isn't released from jail to receive proper medical attention in the United States." Jean-Juste was given temporary release from prison to seek care in Miami in early 2006.

However, he returned to Haiti in November 2007 to defend himself against the still-pending charges. When asked about his experience with weapons, he replied, "My rosary is my only weapon". The charges against him were dismissed.

Jean-Juste died in a hospital in the Miami area on 27 May 2009.

== Awards and recognition ==
On 11 September 2006, the University of San Francisco conferred an Honorary Doctorate degree on Fr. Jean-Juste to recognize his human rights and social justice work on behalf of Haiti's poor.

The Carter Center named Jean-Juste one of the "Featured Human Rights Defenders" of its Human Rights Defenders Initiative.
