= Grosse Caye =

Haitian island

Native name: La Grosse Caye
- Location within Haiti

Geography
- Location: Baie d'Aquin
- Coordinates: 18°13′0.01″N 73°24′0.01″W
- Total islands: 1
- Major islands: 1
- Area: 2 km^{2} (0.77 sq mi)
- Highest elevation: 3 m (10 ft)

Administration
- Haiti
- Department: Sud
- Arrondissement: Aquin

Demographics
- Population: Approximately 500

Grosse Caye (Haitian Creole: Gwòskay) is an island of Haiti which is located in Sud, east of Île-à-Vache which is located a bit further west, in the Baie des Cayes (Bay of the Cayes) and north of the Canal du Sud.
