= Houck =

Houck may refer to:

== Places ==
Communities

- Houck, Arizona, a census-designated place in Apache County, Arizona, United States
- Houck, Missouri, an unincorporated community, United States
- Houck, Torbeck, Haiti, village in the Les Cayes arrondissement in the Sud department of Haiti
- Oost Houck, a commune in the Nord department in northern France

Landscape

- Houck Mountain, in the state of New York, United States
- Houck's Ridge, Gettysburg in the state of Pennsylvania, United States

Structures

- Houck Covered Bridge, in Putnam County, Indiana, United States
- Houck Farmhouse, historic home located at Guilderland in Albany County, New York, United States
- Houck Stadium, multi-purpose stadium in Cape Girardeau, Missouri, United States

== People ==
with this surname

- Byron Houck (1891–1969), American pitcher in Major League Baseball during the 1910s
- Charles Weston Houck (1933–2017), United States federal judge
- Colleen Houck, (born 1969), American writer
- Doris Houck (1921–1965), American film actress
- Edd Houck (born 1950), American politician
- Ella Virginia Houck (1862–1940), American socialite and clubwoman
- George Francis Houck (1847–1916), Chancellor of the Roman Catholic Diocese of Cleveland
- Herbert N. Houck (1915–2002), American Naval flying ace awarded three Navy Crosses during World War II
- Hudson Houck (born 1943), American retired professional football coach
- Jacob Houck Jr. (1801–1857), American attorney and U.S. Representative from New York
- James R. Houck (1940–2015), American astronomer
- James W. Houck (born 1958), retired United States Navy vice admiral
- John Houck (born 1960), American disc golfer
- Joy N. Houck Jr. (1942–2003), American actor, screenwriter and film director
- L. Roy Houck (1905–1992), American politician and rancher
- Leo Houck (1888–1950), American boxer
- Matthew Houck (born 1980), American singer-songwriter
- Paul Houck (born 1963), Canadian former ice hockey player
- Sadie Houck (1856–1919), American professional baseball player from 1879 to 1888
- Tanner Houck (born 1996), American professional baseball player
- William Limburg Houck (1893–1960), Canadian politician
- William Russell Houck (1926–2016), American Roman Catholic bishop

other

- Rebecca Chavez-Houck (born c.1961), Democratic member of the Utah State House of Representatives

== See also ==
- Hock (disambiguation)
- Houk
- Huck (disambiguation)
