= Houck, Haiti =

Houck
- Village
- Location in Haiti
- Coordinates: 18.1459484°N 73.8361019°W
- Country: Haiti
- Department: Sud
- Arrondissement: Les Cayes
- Elevation: 14 m (46 ft)

Houck is a village in the Torbeck commune of the Les Cayes Arrondissement, in the Sud department of Haiti. It is located 4 kilometers southwest of Torbeck on Route Nationale #2.
