= Jacques Roche =

- Born: 21 July 1961; Cavaellon, Haiti
- Disappeared: 10 July 2005; Port-au-Prince, Haiti
- Status: Found dead
- Died: 14 July 2005 (Age 44); Port-au-Prince, Haiti
- Cause of death: Tortured, shot.
- Body discovered: Port-au-Prince, Haiti
- Resting place: Pétion-Ville, Haiti
- Monuments: The Ciradelle, Labadee, Cathedrale Notre Dame
- Occupations: Arts & Culture section journalist, TV host, and poet
- Employer: Le Matin

Jacques Roche (21 July 1961 – 14 July 2005) was a Haitian journalist and editor for Le Matin newspaper and a host of a TV show in Port-au-Prince, Haiti, who was kidnapped, tortured and killed during a wave of abductions carried out before elections. Roche was affiliated with Group of 184 and an opponent of Jean-Bertrand Aristide and his Fanmi Lavalas political party and pro-Lavalas were suspected of carrying out his murder.

== Personal ==
Jacques Roche was born 21 July 1961. His family was from Cavaellon and according to Father Gérard Jean-Juste, Roche's mother once saved his life.

Roche led the organization Assemblée des Peuples de la Caraïbe au Cap Haïtien. Roche was known to organize photography exhibitions to educate different communities throughout Haiti. He also encouraged the public's resistance to laws being passed in Haiti, such as the Haiti's Zona Franca, a law which replaced some of the last fertile land in Haiti with sweatshops.

== Career ==
Jacques Roche was a journalist and editor of the Le Matin daily arts and culture newspaper section. He also hosted a local television show. The television show he was a host for focused on civil society issues for Group of 184. Roche was also a poet.

== Death ==
He was murdered in Port-au-Prince, Haiti.

Jacques Roche was kidnapped on 10 July 2005. Roche was driving in the downtown area of Nazon in Port-au-Prince where he would participate in a civil rights rally. Roche was kidnapped by a group of three or four people and then handed over to a gang who then demanded a ransom.

The kidnappers of Roche demanded a $250,000 ransom for his safe return, but his family and friends could only come up with $10,000, therefore he was killed. His family suspect that his affiliation with the Group of 184 ultimately led to his kidnapping and execution. Group of 184 is an anti-Aristide group that protests against the civil rights that they have in Haiti.

Days later in the afternoon of 14 July 2005, Roche's tortured body was found in the downtown area of Port-au-Prince. Television footage showed him tied to a chair and mutilated. Police say he was tortured, both of Roche's arms were broken, his tongue had been cut out. His actual cause of death was ruled as gun shots to the mouth.

Various charges were made about which group was involved in Roche's kidnapping and directed against the government and a priest. Political opposition leader Father Gérard Jean-Juste, a priest who attended Roche's funeral and was attacked and beaten by mourners, was also accused and detained for questioning, although he was in Florida at the time of Roche's murder and he knew Roche's family. Those charges were later dropped following international protest and claims of political motivation by government police and judges.

On 16 and 22 July 2005, members of the UN mission in Haiti (MINUSTAH) and local police arrested three suspects. According to Reporters Without Borders, the suspects belonged to a gang called the "Rat Army" that operated in the Port-au-Prince district of Bel-Air. Two people were later sentenced to life in prison for the death of Roche.

== Context ==
Jacques Roche is just one of many journalists in Haiti who had been threatened due to his affiliation with the news and media of Haiti. It is believed that journalists all throughout Haiti have been targeted, threatened and attacked because of the lawlessness in Haiti. Some journalists have taken to extreme measures and fled the country because of this. Nancy Roc, who was a host for a radio show in Haiti called Radio Metropole, fled the country after she was threatened and warned of being abducted.

== Impact ==
Roche's death is believed to be the beginning of a long string of kidnappings and killings within Haiti. These murders target people who are activists of civil rights in the country. The only way for these killings to stop is for there be an agreement on the rights of the Haitian citizens. Over the last year, Port-au-Prince, Haiti has been the target of hundreds of kidnappings and killings. More than 700 people have been killed in the past 10 months, 40 of those people being law enforcement officials.

== Reactions ==
After Jacques Roche's kidnapping, murder and finding of his body, civil society organizations showed support by stating how much of an impact Roche's contributions as an activist had on the community. These organizations called for everyone to come together and honor Jacques Roche by continuing to protest the terrible living conditions that their community has had for many years.

After Roche's death, international groups spoke out about his death.

Koïchiro Matsuura, director-general of UNESCO, said, "I condemn the abduction and murder of Jacques Roche. He is a victim of the violence that continues to plague the Haitian capital. His murder was not directly linked to his professional activities, but the press is one of the sectors most at risk in this climate of terror. Journalists in Haiti have been threatened and attacked, and are forced to limit their movements due to the pervasive lawlessness. A free and independent press, which is an essential component of a democratic society, cannot exist in such conditions. I trust that the government of Haiti will play its part in restoring order and the rule of law."

ActionAID, which is a group in South Africa issued a statement saying "We fervently denouncing Jacques Roche's cowardly execution. We firmly state our outrage on all the attacks on all journalists and citizens." This organization is also known for working together to come to an end of human suffering.

== Works about ==
- A documentary about Jaques Roche

== See also ==
- Human rights in Haiti
- List of kidnappings
- Lists of solved missing person cases
