= Grand-Place (disambiguation) =

Grand-Place is the central square of Brussels, Belgium.

Grand-Place, Grand'Place or Grand Place may refer to:

- Grand-Place (Tournai), the central square of Tournai, Belgium
- Grand'Place, a shopping mall in Grenoble
- Grand Place, Haiti, a village in Haiti
- Grand Place, Reunion, a village in La Réunion
- Grand'Place, the largest square of Arras, France
