= Manoa (disambiguation) =

Mānoa is a suburb of Honolulu in Hawaii.

Manoa may also refer to:

- SS Manoa, U.S. navy ship decommissioned in 1919, formerly named USS Shoshone (ID-1760)
- SS Manoa, Matson Line liner that sailed from San Francisco to Hawaii
- Mānoa (journal), a literary journal
- 123290 Manoa, main-belt minor planet
- Manõa, legendary city of gold also known as El Dorado
- Manoa, Haiti, village in the Aquin Arrondissement of Haiti

== People ==
- Manoa Dobui, Fijian politician, who won the Samabula Tamavua Open Constituency in the House of Representatives
- Manoa Masi (born 1974), Fijian football midfielder
- Manoa Rasigatale, Fijian politician and television personality
- Manoa Thompson (born 1968), former Australian professional rugby league footballer
- Manoa Vosawai (born 1983), Italian rugby union player
- Afaese Manoa (born 1949), Tuvaluan writer and musician
- Asenate Manoa (born 1992), Tuvaluan athlete who represented Tuvalu at the 2008 Summer Olympics
- Tim Manoa (born 1964), former professional American football player
- Samu Manoa (born 1985), American rugby union player

== See also ==
- University of Hawaiʻi at Mānoa, university in Manoa
- Manoas, one of a number of groups of Indigenous peoples in Peru
