= Longevity claims =

Unverified claims of human longevity

Longevity claims are unsubstantiated cases of asserted human longevity. Those asserting lifespans of 110 years or more are referred to as supercentenarians. Many have either no official verification or are backed only by partial evidence. Cases where longevity has been fully verified, according to modern standards of longevity research, are reflected in an established list of supercentenarians based on the work of organizations such as the Gerontology Research Group (GRG) or Guinness World Records. This article lists living claims greater than that of the oldest living person whose age has been independently verified, British woman Ethel Caterham, aged 117 years, 92 days, and deceased claims greater than that of the oldest person ever whose age has been verified, French woman Jeanne Calment, who died aged 122 years and 164 days. The upper limit for both lists is 130 years.

== Scientific status ==
Prior to the 19th century, there was insufficient evidence either to demonstrate or to refute centenarian longevity. Even today, no fixed theoretical limit to human longevity is apparent. Studies in the biodemography of human longevity indicate a late-life mortality deceleration law: that death rates level off at advanced ages to a late-life mortality plateau. This implies that there is no fixed upper limit to human longevity, or fixed maximum human lifespan. Researchers in Denmark have found a way to determine when a deceased person was born using radiocarbon dating done on the lens of the eye.

== Categorization ==
Guinness World Records from its inception in 1955 began maintaining a list of the verified oldest people. It developed into a list of all supercentenarians whose lifespan had been verified by at least three documents, in a standardized process, according to the norms of modern longevity research. Many unverified cases ("claims" or "traditions") have been controverted by reliable sources. Taking reliable demographic data into account, these unverified cases vary widely in their plausibility.

== Fully verified claims ==
- The oldest person verified by modern standards, and the only person with evidence to have lived to be at least 120 years of age, is French woman Jeanne Calment (21 February 1875 – 4 August 1997), aged 122 years and 164 days.
- The oldest man verified by modern standards, and the only man with undisputed evidence to have lived to be over 116, is Japanese Jiroemon Kimura (19 April 1897 – 12 June 2013), aged 116 years and 54 days.
- The oldest verified living person is British Ethel Caterham, born 21 August 1909, aged 117 years, 92 days.
- The oldest verified living man is Brazilian João Marinho Neto, born 5 October 1912, aged 114 years, 47 days.

== Problems in documenting ==
In numerous editions from the 1960s through the 1980s, Guinness stated that

No single subject is more obscured by vanity, deceit, falsehood, and deliberate fraud than the extremes of human longevity.

This caveat notwithstanding, Guinness at the same time listed a Canadian named Pierre Joubert as the oldest person to have ever lived, with supposedly "irrefutable" documentary proof showing he had been born in 1701 and died in 1814 – it was later discovered that a father born in 1701 and his son born in 1732 had been conflated, and Joubert has been removed from lists of supercentenarians.

In another case, Lucy Hannah, previously regarded as having reached age 117, had her verification removed in 2020 following the discovery of additional documents.

Despite demographic evidence of the known extremes of modern longevity, stories in otherwise reliable sources still surface regularly, stating that these extremes have been exceeded. Responsible, modern, scientific validation of human longevity requires investigation of records following an individual from birth to the present (or to death); purported longevity claims far outside the demonstrated records regularly fail such scrutiny.

Actuary Walter G. Bowerman stated that ill-founded longevity assertions originate mainly in remote, underdeveloped regions, among non-literate peoples, with only family testimony available as evidence. This means that people living in areas of the world with historically more comprehensive resources for record-keeping have tended to hold more claims to longevity, regardless of whether or not individuals in other parts of the world have lived longer.

In the transitional period of record-keeping, records tend to exist for the wealthy and upper-middle classes, but are often spotty and nonexistent for the middle classes and the poor. In the United States, birth registration did not begin in Mississippi until 1912 and was not universal until 1933. Hence, in many longevity cases, no actual birth record exists. This type of case is classified by gerontologists as "partially validated".

=== Proximate records ===
Since some cases were recorded in a census or in other reliable sources, obtainable evidence may complete full verification.

- Maggie Barnes: Barnes claimed to be 117 at her death on 19 January 1998. Barnes, who was born to a former slave and married a tenant farmer, had fifteen children, 11 of whom preceded her in death. Inconsistent records suggested that she was born on 6 March 1882 at the latest, but possibly a year earlier. The conclusion is that Barnes was at least 115 years and 319 days old at her death, and may have been one or two years older.

=== Late-life records ===
In another type of case, the only records that exist are late-life documents. Because age inflation often occurs in adulthood (to avoid military service or to apply for a pension early), or because the government may have begun record-keeping during an individual's lifetime, some cases are unverified by proximate records. These unverified cases are less likely to be true (because the records are written later), but are still possible. Longevity narratives were not subjected to rigorous scrutiny until the work of William Thoms in 1873. Thoms proposed the 100th-birthday test: is there evidence to support an individual's claimed age at what would be their centenary birthday? This test does not prove a person's age, but does winnow out typical pension-claim longevity exaggerations and spontaneous claims that a certain relative is over 150.

- Hanna Barysevich: Barysevich claimed to have been 118. This can be neither verified nor disproven from Belarusian records. The claim is demographically possible but incompletely verified.
- Pasikhat Dzhukalaeva: In 2004, The Moscow Times reported that Dzhukalayeva, of Chechnya, claimed to have been born in 1881 (age 122). The claim is possible but incompletely verified. Her death has not been reported since that time, so no age greater than 122 has been verifiably claimed.
- Susie Brunson: Ebony magazine reported in 1973 that she was in good health at 102 years old, the first major claim of her longevity. She is later mentioned in 1975, when various newspapers claimed that she was celebrating her 105th birthday. An article in the Spokesman-Review claims Brunson received a call from President Ronald Reagan on her 113th birthday in 1983 (and many other papers claim that Brunson's birthday was attended by New York Congressman Raymond J McGrath, dubbing her the oldest person in the nation), and other articles written about her longevity appear later on. Her obituaries appear in Star-News newspaper and The New York Times. Her family claimed that she was born 25 December 1870 and lived to age 123, dying in late November 1994.

== Reports with complete date of birth ==
These are standardized lists of people whose lifespans remain unverified by proximate records, including both modern (Guinness-era) and historical cases. All cases in which an individual's supercentenarian lifespan is not (yet) backed by records sufficient to the standards of modern longevity research are listed as unverified. They may be factually true, even though records do not exist (or have not yet been found), so such lists include these grey-area cases.

=== Recent ===
These living supercentenarian cases, in descending order of claimed age, with full birth and review dates, have been updated within the past two years, but have not had their claimed age validated by an independent body such as the Gerontology Research Group or Guinness World Records. The list includes only those claims that are greater than the age of the oldest verified living person, currently Ethel Caterham, aged 117 years, 92 days, but under 130 years.

Name	Sex	Reported birth date	Claimed age	Country	Latest report	Ref.
Maria Vikentyevna Kononovich	F	27 May 1904	122 years, 178 days	Belarus	28 January 2025	
Deolira Glicéria Pedro da Silva	F	10 March 1905	121 years, 256 days	Brazil	10 March 2026	
Jose Flores Flores	M	11 July 1907	119 years, 133 days	Costa Rica	11 July 2026	
Luís Carlos dos Santos	M	15 February 1908	118 years, 279 days	Brazil	23 February 2026	
Gogo Annah Nkosi	F	7 June 1909	117 years, 167 days	South Africa	7 June 2026	
Qamile Marra	F	19 August 1909	117 years, 94 days	Albania	28 September 2026	

=== Past ===
This table contains supercentenarian claims with either a known death date or no confirmation for more than two years that they were still alive. Only claims greater than that of Jeanne Calment, who died at the age of 122 years, 164 days, but under 130 years are included. They are listed in order of age as of the date of death or date last reported alive.

Name	Sex	Reported birth date	Death date / latest report date	Reported age	Country
Ali Ben Mohamed El Amri	M	5 October 1880	fl. 30 September 2010	129 years, 360 days	Tunisia
Koku Istambulova	F	1 June 1889	27 January 2019	129 years, 240 days	Russia
José Aguinelo dos Santos	M	7 July 1888	20 December 2017	129 years, 166 days	Brazil
Maria do Carmo Gerônimo	F	5 March 1871	14 June 2000	129 years, 101 days	Brazil
Jean Causeur	M	3 March 1645	30 April 1774	129 years, 58 days	France
Mary Ewen	F	5 May 1878	10 April 2007	128 years, 340 days	Jamaica
Cruz Hernández	F	3 May 1878	8 March 2007	128 years, 309 days	El Salvador
Johanna Mazibuko	F	11 May 1894	3 March 2023	128 years, 296 days	South Africa
Ese Gebelek	F	1 July 1894	28 March 2023	128 years, 270 days	Turkey
Sivananda	M	8 August 1896	3 May 2025	128 years, 268 days	India
Elizabeth Israel	F	27 January 1875	14 October 2003	128 years, 260 days	Dominica
Safiah Ujang	F	11 February 1889	26 October 2017	128 years, 257 days	Malaysia
Nana Shaova	F	15 July 1890?	21 January 2019	128 years, 190 days	Russia
José Rosario Serrano Arencas	M	5 March 1881	24 April 2009	128 years, 50 days	Colombia
Swami Kalyandev	M	21 June 1876	14 July 2004	128 years, 23 days	India
William Johnson	M	8 May 1881	15 May 2009	128 years, 7 days	United States
José Paulino Gomes	M	4 August 1895	28 July 2023	127 years, 358 days	Brazil
Ajiben Chandravadia	F	1 January 1891	13 December 2018	127 years, 346 days	India
Luo Meizhen	F	9 July 1885	9 June 2013	127 years, 335 days	Qing Dynasty, China
Juana Bautista de la Candelaria Rodríguez	F	2 February 1885	24 December 2012	127 years, 326 days	Cuba
Luang Pu Chant Siri	M	10 April 1849	23 February 1977	127 years, 319 days	Thailand
Bénicia Souffrant Laguerre	F	17 January 1893	1 November 2020	127 years, 289 days	Haiti
Halim Solmaz	F	1 July 1884	29 March 2012	127 years, 272 days	Turkey
Tshinyelo Dora Muzila	F	4 May 1880	14 January 2008	127 years, 255 days	South Africa
Leandra Becerra Lumbreras	F	31 August 1887	19 March 2015	127 years, 200 days	Mexico
Tian Longyu 田龙玉	F	9 June 1893	28 September 2020	127 years, 111 days	Qing Dynasty, China
Ayşe Bayri	F	1 July 1898	22 September 2025	127 years, 83 days	Turkey
Francoise Pascal	F	5 January 1895	fl. 6 January 2022	127 years, 1 day	Haiti
Eida Karmi	F	1 January 1890?	fl. 19 December 2016	126 years, 353 days	Syria; Greece
Goli Papi	F	5 April 1893?	10 December 2018	125 years, 249 days	Iran
Nicolas Savin	M	17 April 1768	29 November 1894	126 years, 226 days	Russia
Maria Gonçalves dos Santos	F	24 June 1890	15 December 2016	126 years, 174 days	Brazil
Benito Martínez Abrogán	M	19 June 1880	11 October 2006	126 years, 114 days	Cuba
Margarita Lacsi	F	30 March 1878	27 May 2004	126 years, 58 days	Argentina
Marcelino Abad Tolentino	M	5 April 1900	30 March 2026	125 years, 359 days	Peru
Jackson Pollard	M	25 December 1869	7 September 1995	125 years, 304 days	United States
Nuri Öztunç	M	1 July 1885	6 March 2011	125 years, 248 days	Turkey
Juan Ramos	M	24 June 1880	24 January 2006	125 years, 214 days	United States
Aberewa Grace	F	16 August 1878	18 January 2004	125 years, 155 days	Ghana
Masoumeh Sanei Toroghi	F	23 September 1898	6 February 2024	125 years, 136 days	Iraq
Anna Visser	F	25 December 1878	8 January 2004	125 years, 14 days	Namibia
Lü Zimei 吕紫梅	F	8 August 1888	fl. 4 July 2013	124 years, 330 days	Qing Dynasty, China; United States
Maria Etelvina dos Santos	F	15 July 1878	8 March 2003	124 years, 236 days	Brazil
Hu Yeh-mei	F	10 February 1885	24 August 2009	124 years, 195 days	Taiwan
Mariam Amash	F	1 July 1888	22 December 2012	124 years, 174 days	Israel
Socorro Medrano Guevara	F	17 June 1894	13 September 2018	124 years, 88 days	Mexico
Francisca Susano	F	11 September 1897	22 November 2021	124 years, 72 days	Philippines
Armando Frid	M	24 May 1866	28 July 1990	124 years, 65 days	Argentina
Maria Verissimo de Matos	F	5 June 1888	17 June 2012	124 years, 12 days	Brazil
Sher Ali Mia	M	17 July 1894	fl. 10 July 2018	123 years, 358 days	Bangladesh
Ana Martinha da Silva	F	25 August 1880	27 July 2004	123 years, 337 days	Brazil
Carmelo Flores Laura	M	16 July 1890	9 June 2014	123 years, 328 days	Bolivia
Deolinda Soares Rodrigues	F	24 June 1898	1 May 2022	123 years, 311 days	Brazil
Juana Chox Yac	F	29 November 1893	27 September 2017	123 years, 302 days	Guatemala
Arthur Reed	M	28 June 1860	15 April 1984	123 years, 292 days	United States
Tanzilya Bisembeyeva	F	14 March 1896	25 October 2019	123 years, 225 days.	Russia
Daw Mya Kyi	F	9 October 1892	fl. 17 May 2016	123 years, 221 days	Myanmar
Hava Rexha	F	14 August 1880	8 November 2003	123 years, 86 days	Albania
Appaz Iliev	M	1 March 1896	10 May 2019	123 years, 70 days	Russia
Nguyễn Thị Trù	F	4 May 1893	12 July 2016	123 years, 69 days	Vietnam
Li Fengfang	M	5 August 1878	8 October 2001	123 years, 64 days	Qing Dynasty, China; United States
Turupu Aimaiti 图如普·艾麦提	M	5 February 1892	fl. 26 February 2015	123 years, 21 days	Qing Dynasty, China
Live Larsdatter	F	6 August 1575	9 July 1698	122 years, 337 days	Denmark
Shukhrat Aliyeva	F	1 January 1887	1 December 2009	122 years, 334 days	Brazil
Oberia Coffin	F	1 December 1883	18 October 2006	122 years, 321 days	United States
Sudhakar Chaturvedi	M	20 April 1897	27 February 2020	122 years, 313 days	India
Nehemiah Ndur	M	25 February 1890	10 December 2012	122 years, 289 days	Nigeria
Dora Jacobs	F	6 May 1880	19 January 2003	122 years, 258 days	South Africa
Mamie Evans	F	2 July 1872	15 January 1995	122 years, 197 days	United States
Lin Shemu 林蛇母	F	18 June 1902	1 January 2025	122 years, 197 days	Qing Dynasty, China
David Peterson	M	22 November 1850	31 May 1973	122 years, 190 days	United States
Sarah Hoover	F	25 June 1874	15 December 1996	122 years, 173 days	United States
Salma Abdulqadir	F	1 July 1897	18 December 2019	122 years, 170 days	Syria
