= Leandra Becerra Lumbreras =

Mexican supercentenarian claimant (1887? – 2015)

- Born: August 31, 1887 (claimed); Mexico
- Died: March 19, 2015 (aged 127 years, 200 days, unverified); Mexico
- Occupation: Former seamstress
- Known for: Claims of being oldest living person in modern history

Leandra Becerra Lumbreras (August 31, 1887 (claimed) – March 19, 2015) was a purported Mexican revolutionary and supercentenarian who claimed to have been born August 31, 1887, which would have made her the longest living person in history.

== Biography ==
Becerra claimed to have been born on August 31, 1887, to parents who were singers. As The Daily Telegraph writes, this would have meant that "She was 27 when World War I erupted, 75 when John F. Kennedy was shot and over 100 when the Berlin Wall came down."

From 1910 to 1917, Becerra claimed to have fought as a leader of the Adelitas in the Mexican Revolution. The Adelitas were a group of women who joined with their husbands in battle. During the revolution, she was purportedly romantically involved with Margarito Maldonado, a revolutionary leader, who she said gave Becerra an old rifle that she still owned in 2014. Becerra recounted that Maldonado was "one of the great loves of her life."

It has been reported that Becerra outlived her five children and several of her 20 grandchildren, but, as last reported, she still had 73 great-grandchildren and 55 great-great-grandchildren.

== Oldest living person ==
Becerra claimed to have lost her birth certificate in a move in 1974, meaning she could not conclusively prove her age. Since she did not have her birth certificate, the Guinness World Records could not verify Becerra's claim and instead recognized Misao Okawa (1898–2015) as the world's oldest living person, and Jeanne Calment (1875–1997) as the longest-lived person in history.

After her death on March 19, 2015, some media outlets reported that the Mexican government had confirmed that she was 127 at the time of her death, but no officials have so far confirmed this.

A baptism record has been found of a Leandra Becerra Lumbreras of June 4, 1904. This person was born in Joya de San Francisco, Bustamante, Tamaulipas, on March 13 of that year as the daughter of Calixto Becerra and Basilia Lumbreras and would have turned 111 six days before Becerra's death. If this was her, however, she would have been six years old when the Mexican Revolution started.

== See also ==
- List of the oldest living people
- Longevity claims
