= Haiti–India relations =

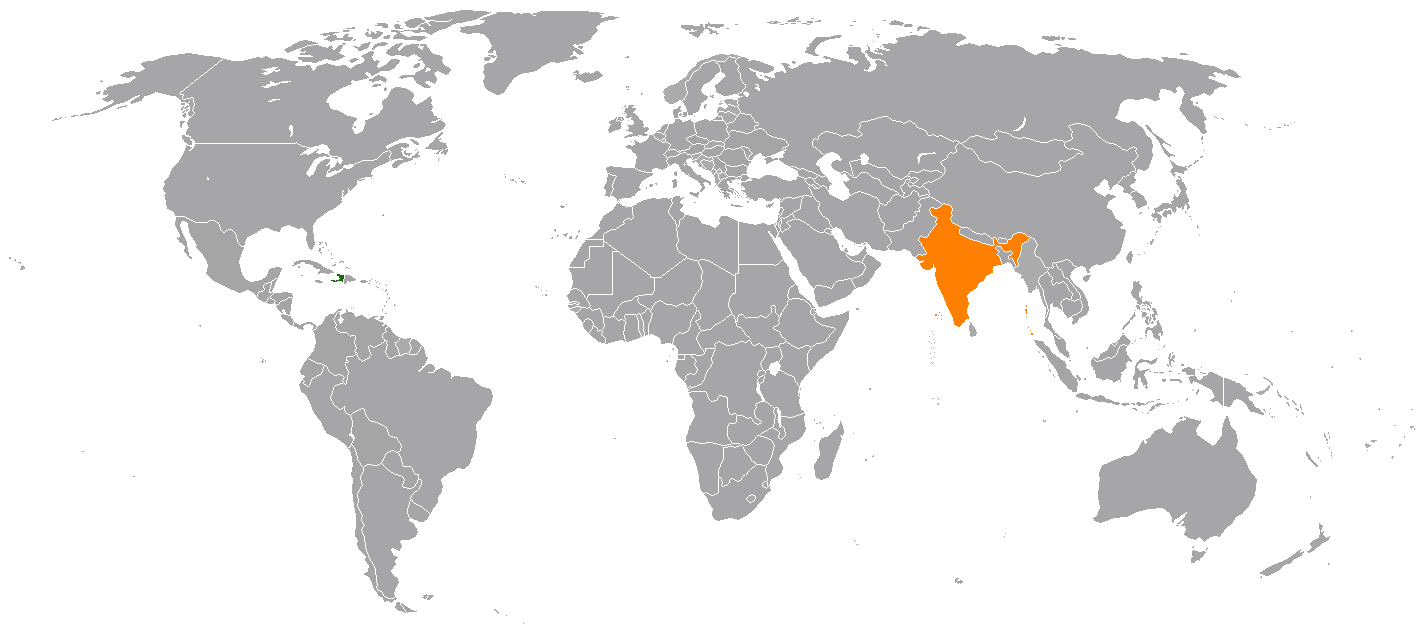

- Haiti: India

Haiti–India relations are the international relations between Haiti and India. The Embassy of India in Havana, Cuba is concurrently accredited to Haiti.

== History ==
Prior to the establishment of diplomatic relations between the two countries, India sent 140 troops from the Central Reserve Police Force to serve in the United Nations Mission in Haiti in August 1995. The Indian contingent was tasked with providing police protection and maintaining law and order in the country, and served until the end of the mission in June 1996. Diplomatic relations between Haiti and India were established on 27 September 1996. The High Commission of India in Kingston, Jamaica was originally concurrently accredited to Haiti until late 2003, when the accreditation was transferred to the Embassy of India in Havana. Haiti appointed a Consul General in New Delhi in October 2014. Haiti and India signed an MoU agreeing to hold regular Foreign Office Consultations on 31 May 2001.

India sent 141 Central Industrial Security Force (CISF) personnel to serve in the United Nations Stabilisation Mission in Haiti (MINUSTAH) in October 2008. A contingent of personnel from the Assam Rifles joined the mission in March 2010, the first time that Assam Rifles has participated in an UN mission. A Border Security Force (BSF) contingent was dispatched to Haiti in November 2010. Two units of about 150 personnel each were stationed in Port-au-Prince, while the remaining unit was stationed in Hinche. On 13 April 2017, the UN Security Council voted unanimously to withdraw UN peacekeeping troops from Haiti by 15 October 2017. The Security Council also agreed to establish a new support mission called the United Nations Mission for Justice Support in Haiti (MINUJUSTH). Two Indian units that served in MINUSTAH will remain in Haiti to serve in MINUJUSTH, while the other unit will return to India. India had a total of 452 personnel serving in MINUSTAH as of February 2017.

== High level visits ==
Minister of Economy and Finance Carmelle Jean Marie visited India on 14–17 October 2014. She participated in the FICCI-LAC Conclave and also met with Minister of State for Commerce & Industry Nirmala Sitharaman. Health Minister Marie L. Florence Duperwal visited Delhi on 25–29 August 2015. She attended the 3rd Global Call to Action Summit and also met with Minister of Health & Family Welfare Maneka Gandhi to request Indian assistance in Haiti's health sector.

== Trade ==
Bilateral trade between Haiti and India totaled US$87.02 million in 2014–15, recording a growth of 45% over the previous fiscal. India exported $85.45 million worth of goods to Haiti, and imported $1.57 million. The main commodities exported by India to Haiti are pharmaceuticals, textiles, rubber products, cosmetics, and plastic and linoleum products. The major commodities imported by India from Haiti are cosmetics, iron and steel, and aluminum.

India provides Haiti with unilateral duty free tariff preferential market (DTFP) access for export of goods and services.

Indian automaker Mahindra operates dealerships in Haiti. Its dealership in Port-au-Prince was damaged by an earthquake in January 2010. Mahindra donated two trucks and two tractors to the Haitian government for relief efforts. A Puducherry-based company shipped efficient charcoal stoves from Chennai to Port-au-Prince in 2013.

== Foreign aid ==
A solid waste management project funded by the India-Brazil-South Africa (IBSA) Trilateral Initiative was inaugurated in Haiti in December 2007. IBSA is also spending $2 million to build community health centres in Haiti. In November 2007, India donated medicines worth $50,000 as towards disaster relief in the aftermath of Hurricane Noel. India donated ₹10 million (equivalent to ₹28 million or US$290,000 in 2023) in October 2008 towards disaster relief in the aftermath of Hurricanes Fay, Hanna, Gustav and Ike, and an additional $5 million for humanitarian assistance in January 2010. Disaster relief of $500,000 was provided annually in 2009, 2010, and 2011.

Following an earthquake in Haiti on 12 January 2010, Indian Minister of State for Science & Technology Shashi Tharoor cut short his visit to South Africa and visited Port-au-Prince on 23 January. He met with Haitian President René Préval who requested India to help construct dwelling units in the country. Tharoor announced that India would provide $5 million to construct a housing colony of 300 houses about 10 km northeast of Port-au-Prince to be named Mahatma Gandhi Village. During the visit, the Indian community in Haiti requested Tharoor to provide compensation as well as flight tickets to India. However, the Indian government only offered to provide repatriation. A fundraiser for Haiti was organized by Bollywood celebrities, Indian businessmen, sportspersons and others in Mumbai on 21 March 2010. The event raised ₹2 crore (equivalent to ₹4.5 crore or US$470,000 in 2023).

In January 2017, India became the fourth country to contribute to the UN Haiti Cholera Response Multi-Partner Trust Fund which aims to control the outbreak of cholera in Haiti. In addition to aid from the Indian government, several Indian NGOs are also active in Haiti. The Unique Service Trust adopted a village in Haiti.

Citizens of Haiti are eligible for scholarships under the Indian Technical and Economic Cooperation Programme. Haitian diplomats have attended the Professional Course for Foreign Diplomats (PCFD) organised by the Foreign Service Institute of the Ministry of External Affairs. Illiterate Haitian women from rural areas have attended solar rural electrification and rooftop rain water harvesting courses, sponsored by the Indian Government, at the Barefoot College in Tilonia, Rajasthan.

== Indians in Haiti ==
Indo-Haitians are Haitians of Indian ancestry who immigrated to or were born in Haiti. As of 2011, there are about 400 Indo-Haitians in the country.

As of February 2016, around 70-80 Indian citizens and persons of Indian origin reside in Haiti, the majority of whom are Indian citizens. Most of the community are professionals such as doctors, engineers and technicians, while others are involved in private businesses such as trading scrap metal. About 15-20 Indians are Christian missionary nuns, and a few are priests.

There is also a contingent of about 500 Indian defence personnel serving in the MINUSTAH since 2008. Indian citizens living in Haiti started an Indian association Haiti in July 2012. There are 56 registered members and each of them are very involved in all cultural and charitable activities organised by the association.
