= Sivananda (yoga teacher) =

Indian yoga teacher (died 2025)

Swami Sivananda

Personal life
- Born: 8 August 1896 (unconfirmed) Sylhet District, North-East Frontier, British India (present day Sylhet Division, Bangladesh)
- Died: 3 May 2025 (claimed age 128) Varanasi, Uttar Pradesh, India
- Occupation: Yoga teacher
- Honours: Padma Shri

Religious life
- Religion: Hinduism

Sivananda (died 3 May 2025), also known as Swami Sivananda, was an Indian yoga teacher, who claimed to have been born on 8 August 1896 (not verified) in Sylhet District of Bengal Presidency of British India. On 21 March 2022, he was awarded Padma Shri by the Government of India.

== Biography ==
Sivananda was alleged to have been born on 8 August 1896, although this has not been independently verified. He was born in Sylhet District of Bengal Presidency of British India (present-day Sylhet Division of Bangladesh).

His parents lived in extreme poverty and had to beg for their living. His sister, mother, and father all died within a month of each other when he was just six years old. Then he travelled to Kashi from Bengal and began serving there. Swami Sivananda mastered yoga and meditation after receiving his education from Guru Omkarananda.

For over three decades, he taught yoga on the banks of the river Ganga in Varanasi. Over fifty years he served 400–600 beggars affected by leprosy. He arranged food, fruits, clothes, winter garments, blankets, mosquito nets, and cooking utensils for their needs. He also promoted Yoga.

Sivananda was a vegetarian. He called fruit and milk fancy food and avoided eating them, instead preferring lentils and rice.

Sivananda died on 3 May 2025. The Hindustan Times gave his age as 128.

== Awards ==
Sivananda was the recipient of several awards including the Yoga Ratna Award, the Basundhara Ratan Award (2019). On 21 March 2022, he was awarded Padma Shri by the Government of India.

== See also ==
- List of Padma Shri award recipients (2020–2029)
