= American University of the Caribbean (Haiti) =

University in Haiti

Coordinates: 18.213400°N 73.754700°W

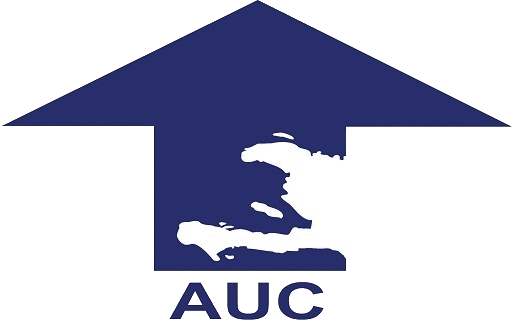
- Established: 1983; 42 years ago
- Location: Les Cayes, Haiti
- Website: www.auc.edu.ht

The American University of the Caribbean (AUC) in Les Cayes, Haiti, was founded and incorporated in 1983 as a not-for-profit institution organized exclusively for educational and scientific purposes. It is incorporated in the State of Florida, recognized by, and licensed with, the “Ministère de l’Education Nationale et de la Formation Professionelle de la République d’Haïti.” The university opened its doors and began programs of instruction in 1985 at Rue Antoine Simon in Les Cayes. It is a nondenominational Christian school.

In 1989, the university moved to its present site, the Pierre Toussaint Campus, Charpentier, and into a 61,000 sq ft (5,700 m^{2}) building, the construction of which was funded by the American Schools and Hospitals Abroad (ASHA).
