= Swami Kalyandev =

Indian-born ascetic

- Born: Kalyandev ji Maharaj; 26 June 1876 (claimed); Kotana, Bagpat district, Uttar Pradesh, India
- Died: 14 July 2004 (claimed age 128); India
- Known for: Alleged supercentenarian status

Kalyandev ji Maharaj (26 June 1876 (claimed) – 14 July 2004), known as Swami Kalyandev, was an Indian-born ascetic who was awarded the Padma Bhushan, the third highest civilian award in India, for his social work in the villages of India.

== Biography ==
Swami Kalyandev was born as Kaluram on the claimed date of 26 June 1876, in the village of Kotana, Bagpat district, Uttar Pradesh and grew up in Mundbhar, Muzaffarnagar. In his youth, he traveled to Ayodhya and Haridwar. While in Haridwar he heard of Swami Vivekananda's visit to Khetri, and traveled there to meet him.

On his return from Khetri, Kalyandev became the disciple of Swami Purnananda of Muni Ki Reti, Rishikesh. Purananda named him Swami Kalyandev. Kalyandev did tapasya in the Himalayas for a few years but then decided to help the poor people of his region. Kalyandev established almost three hundred schools and medical facilities for the people of western Uttar Pradesh, Haryana, Punjab, Rajasthan, Delhi and elsewhere. He was also noted for his advocacy against untouchability and the caste system.

Kalyandev also supported rebuilding of neglected religious and historical sites. He renovated a monument in Shuktal, Muzaffarnagar associated with Shuka. There, he also established the Shukadeva Ashrama and Seva Samiti. He also renovated parts of Hastinapur, and several pilgrimage sites in Haryana.

=== Later life and death ===
In 1982 he received the Padma Sri award, and in 2000 he received the Padma Bhushan. He was also awarded an honorary D.Litt. by Meerut University. In the late 1980s future Prime Minister Vishwanath Pratap Singh came to Shukatal to pray along with his wife and Kalyandev told him to do his first rally near Bhayla. His advice has been credited with repopularizing Singh as a politician.

During an interview, Kalyandev said his inspiration came in 1893, when he met Vivekananda in Khetri, who said to him, "If you want to see God, go to the huts of the poor. And if you want to attain God, then serve the poor, the helpless, the downtrodden and the miserable." Kalyandev stated that to attain God through service of the poor is the mantra he received from Swamiji.

Swami Kalyandev died in India on 14 July 2004. His age has been disputed due to uncertainty surrounding his birth date.

== See also ==
- Longevity claims
