= Chantal, Haiti =

Chantal Chantal
- Commune
- Interactive map of Chantal
- Location in Haiti
- Coordinates: 18°12′0″N 73°53′0″W
- Country: Haiti
- Department: Sud
- Arrondissement: Les Cayes

Area
  - Total: 160.36 km^{2} (61.92 sq mi)
- Elevation: 40 m (130 ft)

Population (2015)
  - Total: 34,121
  - Density: 212.78/km^{2} (551.09/sq mi)
- Time zone: UTC−05:00 (EST)
  - Summer (DST): UTC−04:00 (EDT)
- Postal code: HT 8130

Chantal (French pronunciation: [ʃɑ̃tal]; Haitian Creole: Chantal) is a commune in the Les Cayes Arrondissement, in the Sud department of Haiti. It has 34,121 inhabitants.

== Settlements ==
- Chantal
- Maisonneuve
- Policard
