= Benito Martínez (longevity claimant) =

Possibly oldest person in the world(died 2006)

Benito Martínez Abrogán
- Born: Benito Martínez Abrogán; June 19, 1880 (claimed); Cavaellon, Haiti
- Died: October 11, 2006 (claimed age 126); Cuba
- Known for: Alleged supercentenarian status

Benito Martínez Abrogán (died October 11, 2006) was a Haitian Cuban who claimed to be the world's oldest living person. He claimed to have been born on June 19, 1880, near Cavaellon, Haiti; however, he had no documents to verify this and was thus never an officially eligible candidate for this record. The Cuban government sent officials to Haiti to investigate, but found nothing to either prove or disprove the claim. Cuban government medical experts attested that he was at least 119 years old at the time of his death, but the reasons for this determination were never presented.

== Early life ==
Martínez has papers proving he came to Cuba via steamship in the 1920s from Haiti, but his age at the time was not recorded. Initially he found employment on the family ranch of future Cuban president Fidel Castro. He was nicknamed, "El Avión" (the aeroplane), for the speed at which he worked as he helped to construct the original highway across Cuba. He later settled in a small farming community outside Ciego de Avila, where he lived out his days as a perpetual bachelor. He attributed his longevity to a healthy diet of rice and fresh vegetables and the occasional alcoholic beverage. Mr. Martínez also said the secret to his long life was that, "he had never cheated a man or said bad things of other people."

== Personal life ==
He never owned a car. He always walked, rode a bike or took the bus. Hobbies included breeding fighting cocks, growing bananas and dancing. He rarely over ate as food was rationed. He ate mostly starchy cassava and sweet potatoes cooked in pork fat. Only in the last twenty years of his life did he give up smoking. His first doctor's visit was not until he was around 115. The only time he went to the hospital was a few days before he died.

== Controversy ==
No actual record exists of either his birth or his life prior to his immigration to Cuba, making him ineligible for consideration for the title of oldest living person, by the Guinness World Records, held at the time of his death by Elizabeth Bolden (August 15, 1890 – December 11, 2006), an African-American woman aged 116. Nonetheless, Abrogan maintained his claim until his death, and in his later years was the star attraction of the country's recently formed 120-Club, an organization promoting healthy lives for Cuba's senior citizens.

== See also ==
- Longevity
- Longevity claims
- Caloric restriction
