= Les Cayes massacre =

Haiti massacre (1929)

- Part of the United States occupation of Haiti
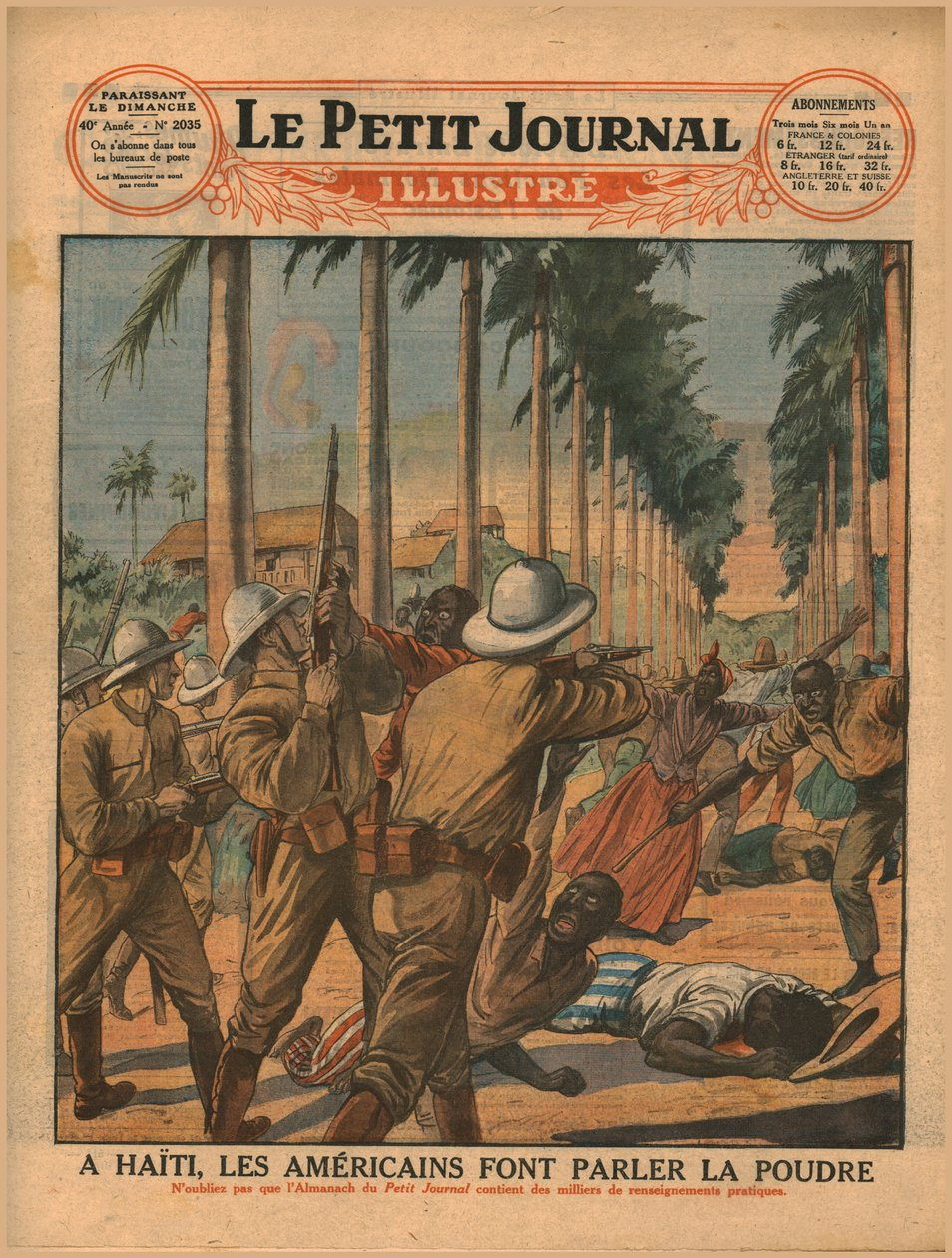
- Le Petit Journal illustration of the massacre
- Location: Marchaterre, Les Cayes, Haiti
- Date: 6 December 1929
- Deaths: 12–22
- Injuries: 51
- Victim: Haitian protesters
- Perpetrator: United States Marine Corps

The Les Cayes massacre, also known as the Marchaterre massacre, was a massacre on 6 December 1929 in Les Cayes perpetrated by U.S. Marines against Haitians protesting the United States occupation of Haiti. The massacre was instrumental in placing pressure on the federal government of the United States to end the occupation.

At the time of the massacre, the United States had invaded Haiti over fourteen years earlier in 1915, with the Marines occupying the country through a military regime on behalf of American business interests. By October 1929, Haitians grew increasingly angered with the American occupation and protests broke out, resulting in a general strike. Such demonstrations culminated with the massacre, which resulted in international condemnation and later the end of American occupation.

== Background ==
=== Invasion of Haiti ===
In February 1915, Jean Vilbrun Guillaume Sam, son of a former Haitian president, took power as President of Haiti. The culmination of his repressive measures infuriated the population in July 1915 when he ordered the execution of 167 political prisoners. The population rose up against Sam's government, resulting in President Sam's killing. The United States regarded the revolt against Sam as a threat to American business interests in the country, especially the Haitian American Sugar Company (HASCO). When the caco rebel-supported Rosalvo Bobo emerged as the next president of Haiti, the United States government decided to act quickly to preserve its economic dominance.

On 28 July 1915, American President Woodrow Wilson ordered 330 United States Marines to occupy Port-au-Prince. Josephus Daniels, the Secretary of the Navy, instructed the invasion commander, rear admiral William Banks Caperton, to "protect American and foreign" interests. Wilson also wanted to rewrite the Haitian constitution, which banned foreign ownership of land, to replace it with one that guaranteed American financial control. To avoid public criticism, Wilson claimed the occupation was a mission to "re-establish peace and order ... [and] has nothing to do with any diplomatic negotiations of the past or the future," as disclosed by Rear Admiral Caperton.

=== Martial law ===
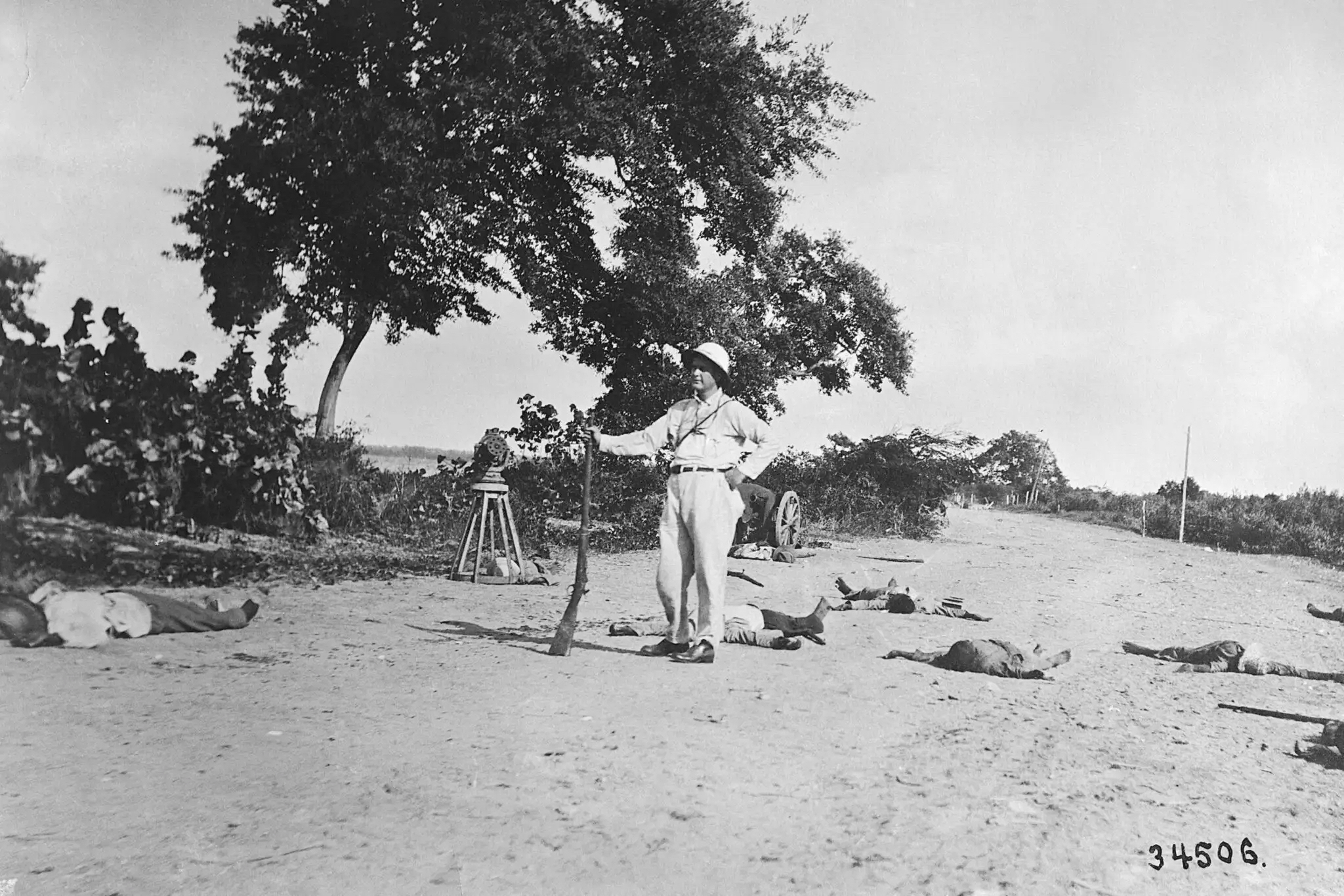
American poses with dead Haitians killed by U.S. Marine machine gun fire on October 11, 1915

In September 1915, the United States Senate ratified the Haitian-American Convention, a treaty granting the United States security and economic oversight of Haiti for ten years. For the next nineteen years, U.S. State Department advisers ruled Haiti, their authority enforced by the United States Marine Corps. The United States Marines ruled Haiti as a military regime using a constant state of martial law, operating the newly created Haitian gendarmerie to suppress Haitians who opposed the occupation. During the occupation of Haiti by the United States, human rights abuses were committed against the Haitian population. Such actions involved the censorship, concentration camps, forced labor, racial segregation, religious persecution of Haitian Vodou practitioners and torture. American troops and the Haitian gendarmerie would ultimately kill several thousands of Haitian rebels during rebellions between 1915 and 1920, though the exact death toll is unknown.

=== National strike ===
President Herbert Hoover had become increasingly pressured about the effects of occupying Haiti at the time and had already begun inquiring about a withdrawal strategy by the late-1920s. By 1929, Haitians, including those who welcomed the intervention, had grown angered with the American occupation; frustrations were especially high due to the "deep resentment against Americans for their roles in censoring the press, collecting customs duties, controlling the distribution of essentials like food and medicine, and forcing a new constitution upon the Haitians".

Beginning on 31 October 1929, student protests at the American-created Service Technique de l'Agriculture et de l'Enseignement Professionne school began due to decreased scholarship awards given to Haitians. These student demonstrations grew into a general strike by Haitians to protest against the American occupation.

== Massacre ==
On 6 December 1929, about 1,500 Haitians in Les Cayes peacefully demonstrated against economic conditions, high taxes and the arrest of three protest leaders, chanting "À bas la misère" or "Down with misery". As the march approached Les Cayes, USMC troops armed with machine guns blocked their advance and some stones were thrown by protesters. The Marines, acting in panic as they felt surrounded, began firing upon the thousands of protesters. The massacre resulted in 12 to 22 Haitian peasants dead, and left 21 to 51 injured.

== Aftermath ==
International condemnation occurred after the massacre, with the event proving to be crucial in promoting the withdrawal of the United States from Haiti. President Hoover called on congress to investigate conditions in Haiti the day after the massacre. The Forbes Commission, ordered by President Hoover, would ultimately conclude that the occupation of Haiti was a failure and that the United States did not "understand the social problems of Haiti". Less than five years later, the United States ended its occupation of Haiti in 1934.

In the following decades, local events were held in memory of the massacre.
