= Baie des Flamands =

- Location in Haiti
- Coordinates: 18°13′12″N 73°40′29″W
- Country: Haiti

Baie des Flamand is a bay located on the southern side of the Sud department of Haiti. It is a branch of the larger Baie des Cayes and the Caribbean Sea.
