= Aquin City =

Aquin City: Ville d'Aquin; Vil Aken
- City
- Location in Haiti
- Coordinates: 18°16′46″N 73°23′39″W
- Country: Haiti
- Department: Sud
- Arrondissement: Aquin

Area
  - Total: 1.18 km^{2} (0.46 sq mi)
- Elevation: 11 m (36 ft)

Population (March, 2015)
  - Total: 9,192
  - Density: 7,790/km^{2} (20,200/sq mi)
- Time zone: UTC-05:00 (EST)
  - Summer (DST): UTC-04:00 (EDT)

Aquin (/æˈkɪn/); also City of Aquin, Aquin City (French: Ville d'Aquin; Haitian Creole: Vil Aken) is the principal town of the Aquin commune of the Aquin Arrondissement, in the Sud department of Haiti.
