= Cavaillon (Haiti) =

Cavaillon Kavayon
- Commune
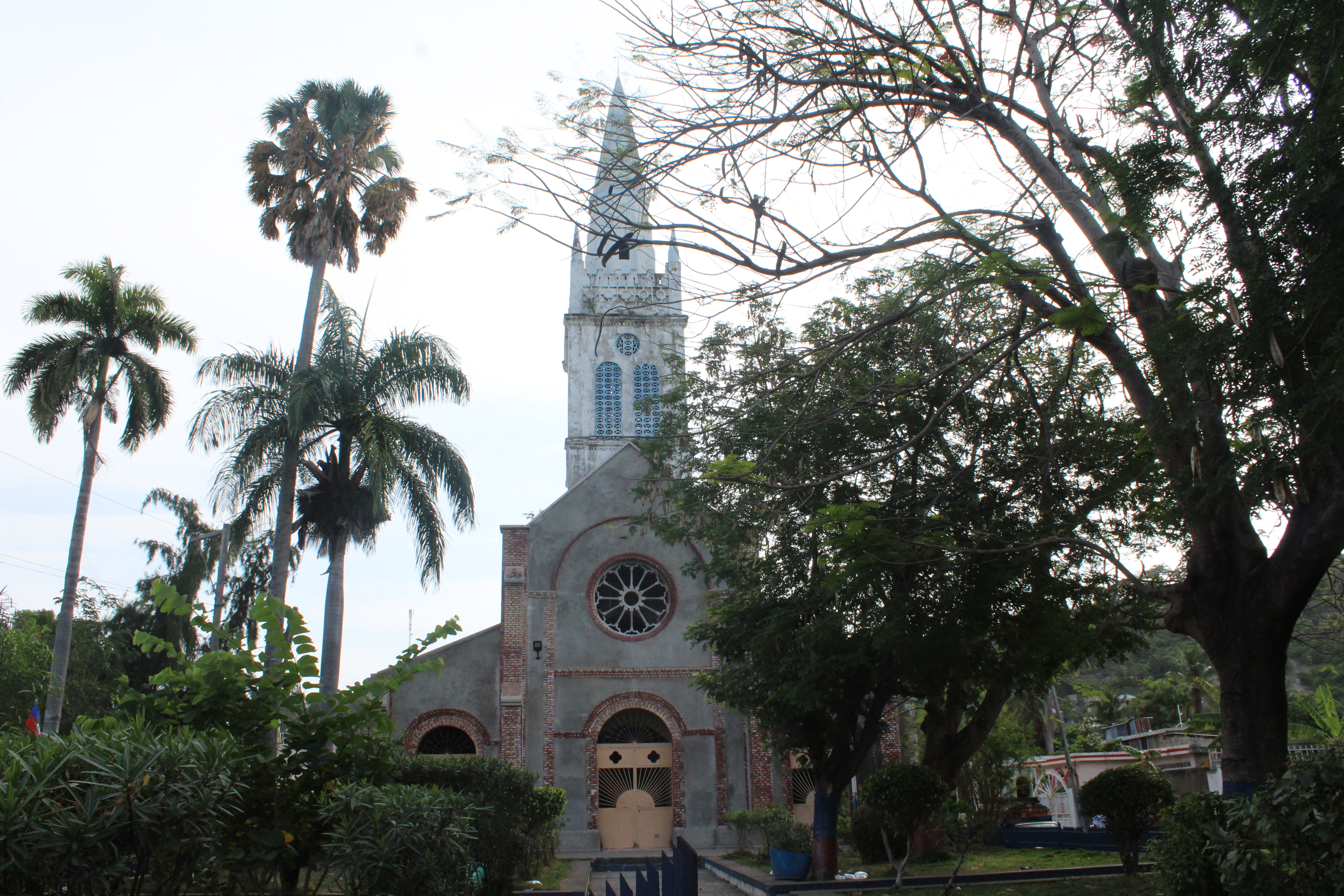
- Interactive map of Cavaillon
- Location in Haiti
- Coordinates: 18°18′0″N 73°39′0″W
- Country: Haiti
- Department: Sud
- Arrondissement: Aquin

Area
  - Total: 214.97 km^{2} (83.00 sq mi)
- Elevation: 109 m (358 ft)

Population (2015)
  - Total: 48,687
  - Density: 226.48/km^{2} (586.59/sq mi)
- Time zone: UTC−05:00 (EST)
  - Summer (DST): UTC−04:00 (EDT)
- Postal code: HT 8330

Cavaillon (French pronunciation: [kavajɔ̃]; Haitian Creole: Kavayon) or Cavaellon is a commune and a rural town located in the Aquin Arrondissement of the Sud department of Haiti.

== Geography ==
Its nearest neighboring towns/cities are Nan Cotie (12 km north), Saint-Louis-du-Sud (20 km southeast), and Les Cayes (16 km west).

=== Villages ===
Balou, Boileau, Bedo, Martineau, Cassignol, Bonne Fin, Digo Salo, Fevre, Grand Dieu, Grand Place, Grand-Blois, Gross Mary, L'ellet, La Marche, Nan Cotie, Rosseau and Volbrune.

== Personalities ==
The town is most famous for being the birthplace of both Benito Martínez Abrogán, Cuba's oldest-ever person, and George Valris, a famous Caribbean artist.
