= Maniche, Haiti =

Maniche Manich
- Commune
- Interactive map of Maniche
- Location in Haiti
- Coordinates: 18°21′0″N 73°46′0″W
- Country: Haiti
- Department: Sud
- Arrondissement: Les Cayes

Area
  - Total: 124.81 km^{2} (48.19 sq mi)
- Elevation: 89 m (292 ft)

Population (2015)
  - Total: 23,934
  - Density: 191.76/km^{2} (496.67/sq mi)
- Time zone: UTC−05:00 (EST)
  - Summer (DST): UTC−04:00 (EDT)
- Postal code: HT 8150

Maniche (French pronunciation: [maniʃ]; Haitian Creole: Manich) is a commune in the Les Cayes Arrondissement, in the Sud department of Haiti. It has 23,934 inhabitants.

The villages of Maniche and Madame Jean Pierre is located in the commune.
