= Indo-Haitians =

Total population
- 580

Regions with significant populations
- Port-au-Prince

Languages
- Tamil · Telugu · Tulu · Kannada · Malayalam · Hindi · French · Haitian Creole ·

Religion
- Hinduism · Islam · Roman Catholicism

Related ethnic groups
- Indo-Caribbean people

Indo-Haitians (French: Indo-Haïtien; Haitian Creole: Indo-Ayisyen) or Indian-Haitans are Haitians of Indian ancestry who immigrated to or were born in Haiti. As of 2011, there were about 10,000 people of East Indian ancestry or ancestry from the Indian subcontinent living in Haiti, with the overwhelming majority of them being mixed with people of African and European ancestry. Their descendants are known as Marabous.

== Overview ==
The Indian community in Haiti consists mainly of professionals, businessmen, and volunteers from the congregation of the Sisters of Charity. The community is made up of immigrants from India as well as other Caribbean islands such as Martinique and Guadeloupe. Indo-Caribbean immigrants from other Caribbean islands have intermarried with other Haitian communities. Their descendants are known as Marabous. There is also an influx of Haitian children born to Afro-Haitian mothers and Sri Lankan Tamil fathers.

=== 2010 Haiti earthquake ===
During the 2010 Haiti earthquake, many members of the Indian community have lost their homes had appealed to the Indian government to provide them financial assistance to rebuild their lives. There were about 40 Indian families scattered around the country at the time, some of whom had been living with the FPU for several days. Those who were wishing to return to India found themselves unable to do so as they could not get into the neighbouring Dominican Republic, which is the only way out of there since there were no direct commercial flights in and out of Haiti.

== See also ==
- Asian Latin Americans
- Indo-Caribbean people
- Haiti–India relations
