= Nan Citron =

Nan Carrotte
- Rural settlement
- Location in Haiti
- Coordinates: 18.3815725°N 72.1298414°W
- Country: Haiti
- Department: Ouest
- Arrondissement: Croix-des-Bouquets
- Elevation: 807 m (2,648 ft)

Nan Carrotte is a rural settlement in the Croix-des-Bouquets commune of the Croix-des-Bouquets Arrondissement, in the Ouest department of Haiti.

== See also ==
- Croix-des-Bouquets, for a list of other settlements in the commune.
