= Torbeck =

Torbeck Tòbèk
- Commune
- Interactive map of Torbeck
- Location in Haiti
- Coordinates: 18°10′0″N 73°49′0″W
- Country: Haiti
- Department: Sud
- Arrondissement: Les Cayes

Area
  - Total: 189.48 km^{2} (73.16 sq mi)
- Elevation: 246 m (807 ft)

Population (2015)
  - Total: 76,083
  - Density: 401.54/km^{2} (1,040.0/sq mi)
- Time zone: UTC−05:00 (EST)
  - Summer (DST): UTC−04:00 (EDT)
- Postal code: HT 8120

Torbeck (French pronunciation: [tɔʁbɛk]; Haitian Creole: Tòbèk) is a commune in the Les Cayes Arrondissement, in the Sud department of Haiti. It has 76,083 inhabitants.

== Settlements ==
- Belle Vue
- Beraud
- Borgolla
- Caprau
- Carrefour Meridien
- Ducis
- Houck
- La Force
- Le Duc
- Saint-Felix
- Torbeck
- Valere
