= Saint-Louis-du-Sud =

Saint-Louis-du-Sud Sen Lwi disid
- Commune
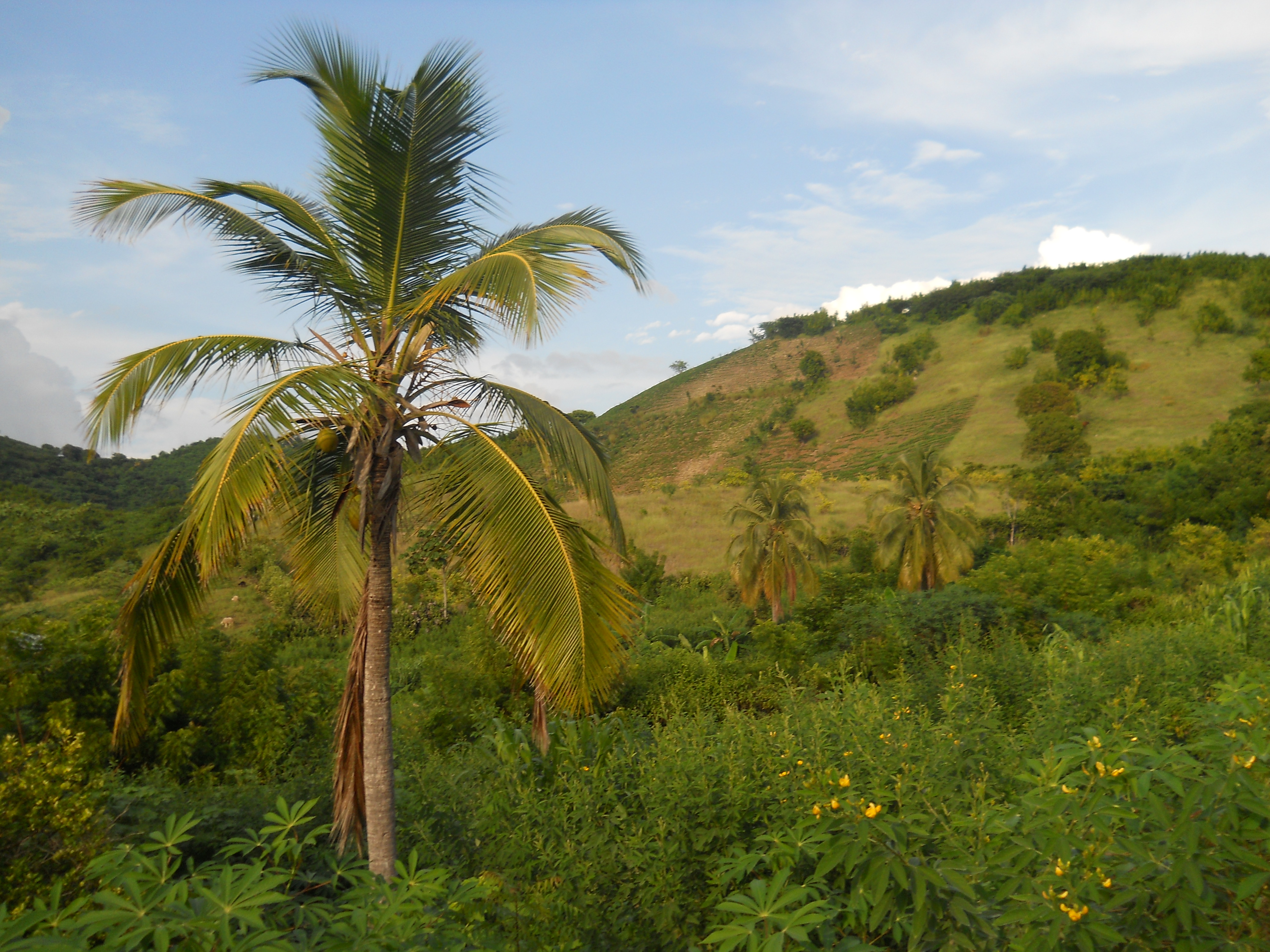
- Interactive map of Saint-Louis-du-Sud
- Location in Haiti
- Coordinates: 18°16′0″N 73°33′0″W
- Country: Haiti
- Department: Sud
- Arrondissement: Aquin

Area
  - Total: 185.71 km^{2} (71.70 sq mi)
- Elevation: 9 m (30 ft)

Population (2015)
  - Total: 64,924
  - Density: 349.60/km^{2} (905.46/sq mi)
- Time zone: UTC-05:00 (EST)
  - Summer (DST): UTC-04:00 (EDT)
- Postal code: HT 8320

Saint-Louis-du-Sud (French pronunciation: [sɛ̃ lwi dy syd]; Haitian Creole: Sen Lwi disid) is a coastal commune in the Aquin Arrondissement, in the Sud department of Haiti. Home to Fort des Oliviers, Fort Anglais and Bonnet Carré, the town is also the location of the 1748 Battle of Saint-Louis-du-Sud. Saint Louis du Sud is home to over 64,924 inhabitants.

== Settlements ==
- Analade
- Bele
- Cherette, Cop
- Corail-Henri
- Madame Louis
- Manoa
- Marcelin
- Meyance, Pointe Figuier
- Saint-Louis-du-Sud
- Senaille
- Terre Neuve
- Zanglais

On August 14, 2021 an M7.2 earthquake struck 12 kilometres (7.5 mi) northeast of the commune. It is the largest earthquake in Haiti since the M7.0 in 2010 that killed 316,000 people
