= Les Cayes =

Les Cayes Okay (Haitian Creole) Aux Cayes, Akaÿu (Arawakan Name)
- Commune
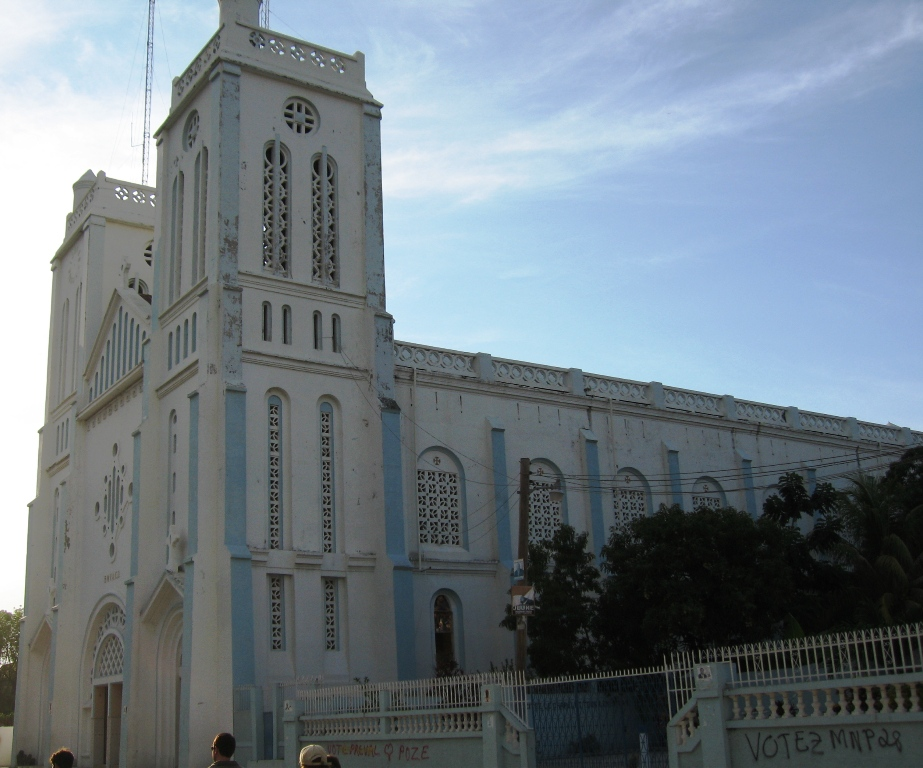
- Les Cayes Cathedral

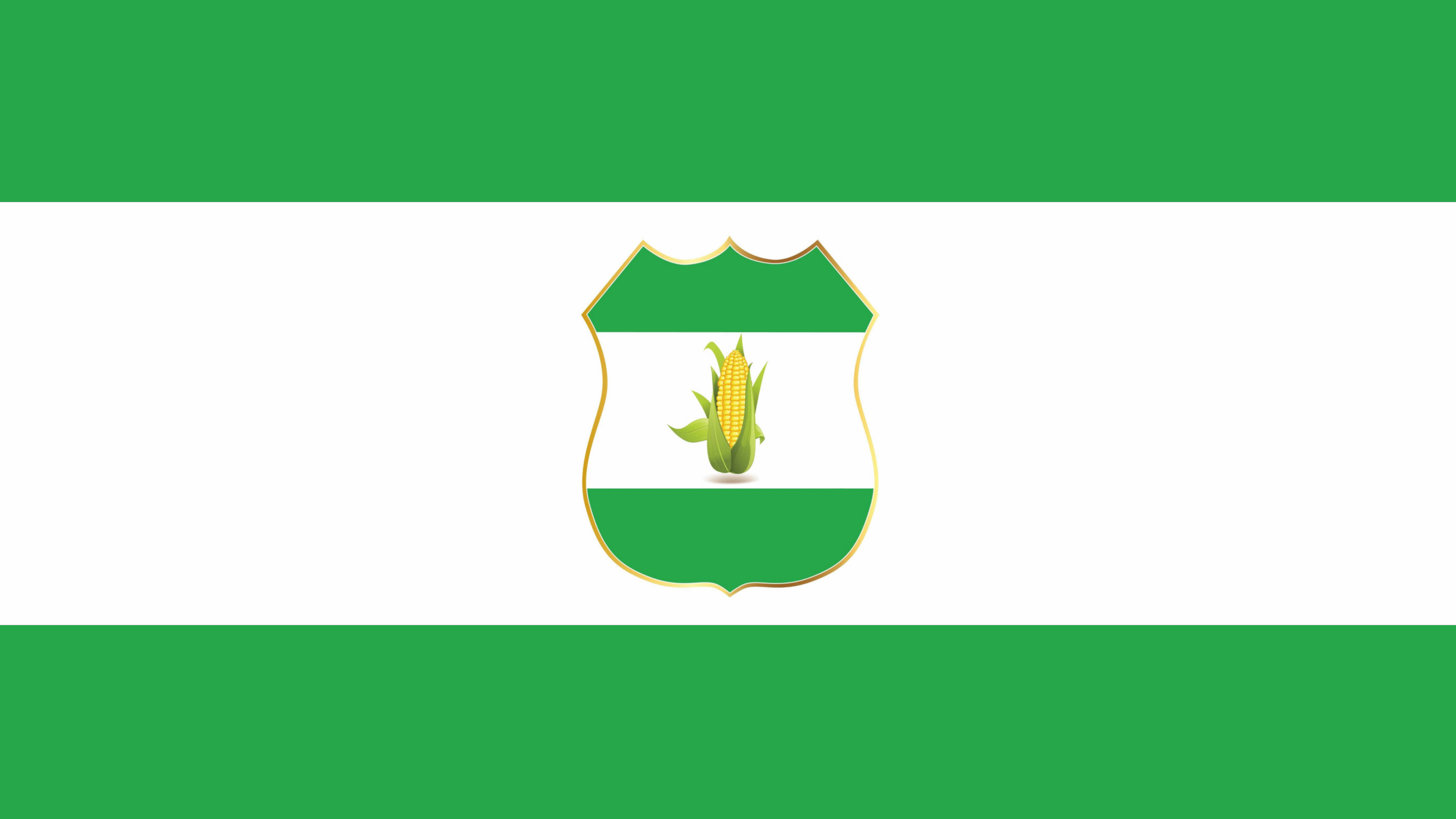
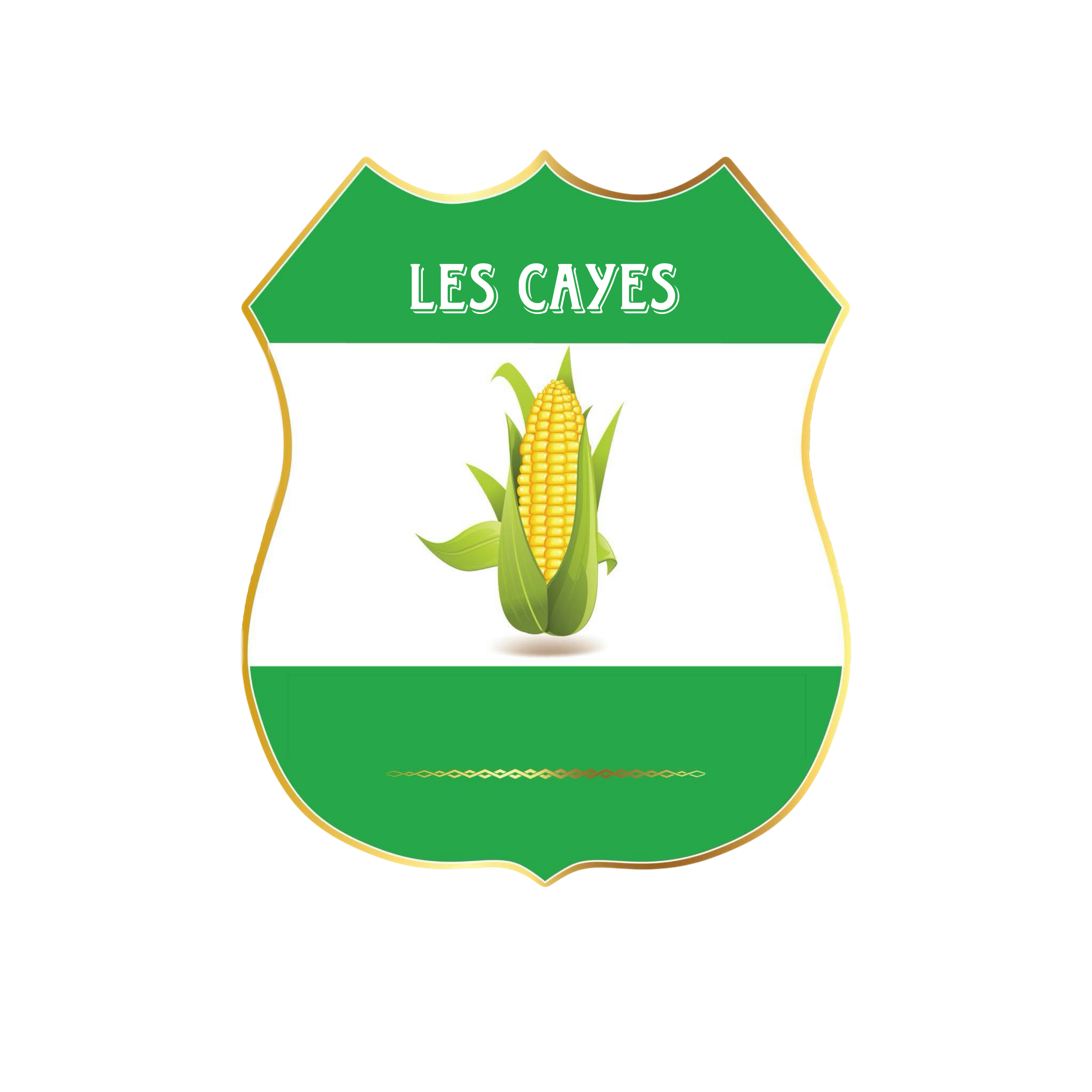
- Flag Coat of arms
- Interactive map of Les Cayes
- Location in Haiti
- Coordinates: 18°12′0″N 73°45′0″W
- Country: Haiti
- Department: Sud
- Arrondissement: Les Cayes

Area
  - Total: 219.11 km^{2} (84.60 sq mi)
- Elevation: 0 m (0 ft)

Population (2015)
  - Total: 151,696
  - Density: 692.33/km^{2} (1,793.1/sq mi)
- Time zone: UTC-5 (Eastern)
  - Summer (DST): UTC-4 (Eastern)
- Postal code: HT 8110

Les Cayes (/leɪ ˈkeɪ, leɪ ˈkaɪ/ lay K(A)Y, French: [le kaj]), often referred to as Aux Cayes (French: [o kaj]; Haitian Creole: Okay), is a commune and seaport in the Les Cayes Arrondissement, in the Sud department of Haiti, with a population of 151,696. Due to its isolation from the political turmoil of the capital, Port-au-Prince, it is one of Haiti's major ports, with export trade concentrating on mostly coffee and sugarcane. As the world's largest supplier of vetiver, it exports 250 tons annually of this ingredient of perfume and fragrance manufacturing. Minor exports include bananas and timber.

== History ==
=== European settlement ===
The island of what was known by the Spanish as Hispaniola was inhabited for thousands of years by indigenous peoples. The first European settlement in the southwest area was the town of Salvatierra de la Sabana, founded by the Spanish explorer Diego Velázquez de Cuéllar in 1504. Vasco Núñez de Balboa was a co-founder of this town and lived there for several years trying to raise pigs as a business. Balboa gave up that enterprise and left the town hiding in a barrel of a Spanish expedition going to explore the Gulf of Uraba, Panama. Vasco Núñez de Balboa, later on 25 September 1513 would discover the South Sea, today known as the Pacific Ocean. This settlement was abandoned in 1540.

The area was uninhabited until the French colonial administration founded the town of Aux Cayes ("On the cayes"), so named due to its proximity to Île-à-Vache. The town was destroyed twice by hurricanes in 1781 and 1788. In July 1793, the whites in Les Cayes were massacred.

=== Asylum for independent insurgencies ===
Simón Bolívar arrived in Les Cayes on 24 December 1815, and on 2 January 1816 was introduced to Alexandre Pétion, President of the Republic of Haiti by a mutual friend seeking assistance for his insurgency against the Spanish colonial government in Venezuela. Bolívar and Pétion impressed and befriended each other and, after Bolívar pledged to free every slave in the areas he occupied, Pétion gave him money and military supplies.

Mexican nationalists, Francisco Javier Mina and José Joaquín de Herrera took asylum in Les Cayes and were welcomed by Pétion during the Mexican War of Independence.

=== United States occupation of Haiti ===
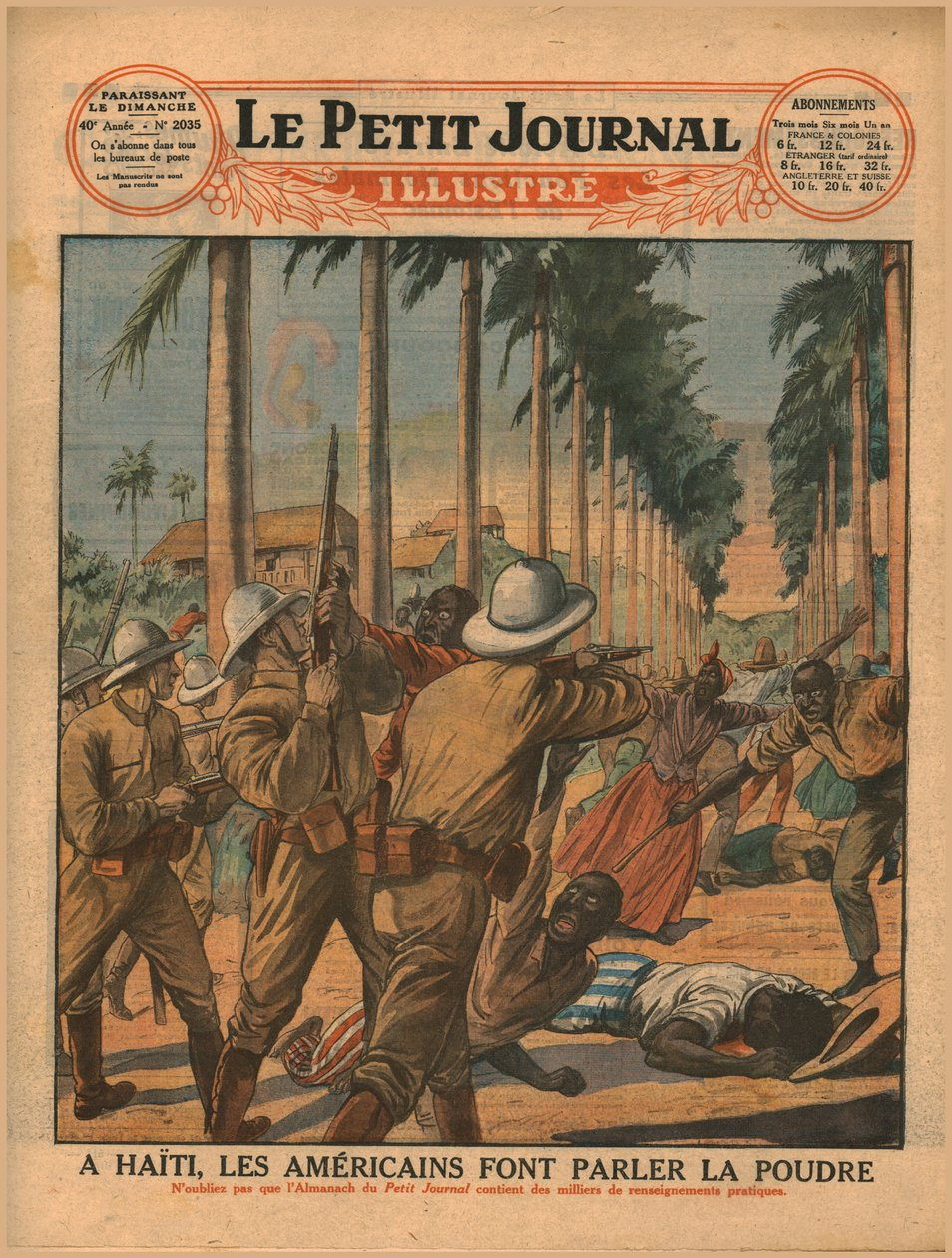
Le Petit Journal illustration of the Les Cayes massacre

On 5 December 5 1919, American planes bombed Les Cayes in a possible act of intimidation. American pilots were investigated for their actions, though none were condemned. These actions were described by anthropologist Jean-Philippe Belleau as possibly "the first ever carried out by air on civilian populations".

President Herbert Hoover had become increasingly pressured about the effects of occupying Haiti at the time and began inquiring about a withdrawal strategy. By 1929, Haitians had grown angered with the Borno-Russell government and American occupation, with demands for direct elections increasing. In early December 1929, protests against the American occupation began at the Service Technique de l’Agriculture et de l’Enseignement Professionnel's main school. On December 6, 1929, about 1,500 Haitians peacefully protesting local economic conditions in Les Cayes were fired upon by U.S. Marines, with the massacre resulting in 12 to 22 Haitians dead and 51 injured. The massacre resulted in international outrage, with President Hoover calling on Congress to investigate conditions in Haiti the following day.

=== Natural disasters ===
In the wake of the 12 January 2010 earthquake, the Cuban military set up a field hospital in the region.

On 4 October 2016, Hurricane Matthew made landfall in Les Cayes causing severe damage.

On 14 August 2021, a magnitude 7.2 earthquake occurred near the city. It was the largest earthquake to strike Haiti in modern history, even stronger than the 2010 earthquake near the Haitian capital. The earthquake killed over 2,200 people and injured around 12,700 others, most of them in Les Cayes and its surrounding areas.

== Tourism ==
The town of Les Cayes plays a significant role in the still under-developed Haitian tourism industry, with sights such as: Gelée Beach: one of the longest and most visited beaches in Haiti. The white sand beach of Gelée is popular in Haiti, for its restaurants, which serve typical southern Haiti dishes such as tonm-tonm, grilled-conch, grilled-fish and lobster, and for hosting an annual music festival around mid-August which usually features some of the best Compas music bands. Visitors from within Haiti and USA come spend the weekend in Les Cayes. As the number of tourists continues to grow, several new hotels and restaurants continue to pop up.

The Botanical Garden of Les Cayes (Jardin Botanique des Cayes, in French) is located in Bergeau, at the northern entrance of the city. The site occupies an area of eight (8) hectares. Other places of interest to tourists are the nearby Île à Vache, Pic Macaya, Saut-Mathurine falls and Kounoubois cave in Camp-Perrin, Pointe-de-Sable beach in Port-Salut, Marie-Jeanne cave in Port-a-Piment and Arrondissement Aquin where Fort des Oliviers, Fort Anglais and Bonnet Carré can be found in the town of Saint Louis du Sud.

== Facilities ==
=== Airport ===
Les Cayes has an airport, Antoine-Simon Airport. In 2013, the first stone on the expansion project of the Antoine-Simon Airport in Les Cayes was laid. The project to make Antoine-Simon a viable international airport is part of broader efforts aiming at ramping up infrastructure development in the south.

The airport projected was completed in 2025, increasing the length of the runway to 1,850 meters (6,069 feet), increasing aircraft capacity, adding new lighting, a weather station, a control tower, and space for an Anti-Drug Trafficking Brigade. The overall cost of the project was $26.44 million. At the time that the project began, Haitian officials Prime Minister Laurent Lamothe and Tourism Minister Stéphanie Villedrouin suggested that the airport would open up completely the Southern Region as the country saw tourism as one of the promising sectors capable of creating thousands of new jobs in the region. In the context of Haiti's ongoing crisis, infrastructure in the south of Haiti has gained new importance, as the highways connecting the region to the rest of the country are under gang control.

The expanded airport received its first international passenger flight on November 10, 2025, an IBC Airways flight from Miami.

Another airport project is also planned for the neighbouring island of Île-à-Vache.

=== University ===
Les Cayes has some training centers of which The American University of the Caribbean, Haiti; The Public University of The South in Les Cayes, (UPSAC); and The Law and Economics School of Les Cayes (EDSEC).

=== Hospital ===
Hôpital Immaculée Conception (Immaculate Conception Hospital, also referred to as HIC-Cayes), is the public hospital for Les Cayes and the South Department. Its facilities include an emergency department, maternity ward, and a dental clinic.

== Sport ==
Les Cayes is home to professional football clubs, America des Cayes and FC Juventus des Cayes.

== Notable natives and residents ==
- John James Audubon, French-American naturalist
- Euphémie Daguilh, Royal mistress to the Haitian emperor Jean-Jacques Dessalines
- Jean Joseph Maurice Dartigue (1903-1983), Minister of Public Instruction, Labor, and Agriculture from 1941 until 1945
- Auguste Davezac, United States Ambassador to the Netherlands
- André Corvington, Olympic fencer
- André Rigaud, Haitian revolutionary leader, was born here on a plantation.
- Assotto Saint, writer and artist
- Horace Pauleus Sannon (1870-1938) was a Haitian historian and politician and presidential candidate in 1926 and 1930
- Jean Ernest Muscadin, Haitian prosecutor in Miragoâne
- Pierre-Théoma Boisrond-Canal (1832-1905), President of Haiti (1876-1879, 1888, 1892)
- François-Wolff Ligondé (1928-2013), Archbishop of Port-au-Prince
- Jacques Nicolas Léger (1859-1918), Haitian lawyer, politician, diplomat, and writer
- Lysius Salomon (1815-1888), 13th President of Haiti (1879-1888)
- Michel Domingue (1813-1877), President of Haiti (1874-1876)
- Hérard Dumesle (1784-1858), Haitian poet and politician
- François C. Antoine Simon (1843-1923), President of Haiti (1908-1911)

== Villages ==
- Yersleres

== Sources ==
- Arana, Marie (2013). Bolívar: American Liberator. Simon & Schuster. ISBN 978-1-4391-1020-1.
- Langley, Lester D. (2009). Simón Bolívar: Venezuelan Rebel, American Revolutionary. Rowman & Littlefield. ISBN 978-0-7425-6655-2.
- Lynch, John (2006). Simón Bolívar: A Life. Yale University Press. ISBN 978-0-300-12604-4.
- Masur, Gerhard (1969) [1948]. Simón Bolívar (Revised ed.). University of New Mexico Press. ISBN 978-0-8263-0131-4.
- McFarlane, Anthony (2014). War and Independence in Spanish America. Routledge. ISBN 978-1-85728-783-7.
- Slatta, Richard W.; de Grummond, Jane Lucas (2003). Simón Bolívar's Quest for Glory. Texas A&M University Press. ISBN 978-1-58544-239-3.
