= Les Cayes Arrondissement =

Coordinates: 18.2°N 73.75°W

Les Cayes Arrondissement Arrondissement des Cayes Awondisman Okay
- Arrondissement
- Interactive map of Les Cayes Arrondissement
- Country: Haiti
- Department: Sud

Area
  - Arrondissement: 873.49 km^{2} (337.26 sq mi)
  - Urban: 22.62 km^{2} (8.73 sq mi)
  - Rural: 850.87 km^{2} (328.52 sq mi)

Population (2015)
  - Arrondissement: 346,276
  - Density: 396.43/km^{2} (1,026.7/sq mi)
  - Urban: 105,697
  - Rural: 240,579
- Time zone: UTC-5 (Eastern)
- Postal code: HT81—
- Communes: 6
- Communal Sections: 20
- IHSI Code: 071

Les Cayes, often referred to as Aux Cayes (Haitian Creole: Okay) is an arrondissement in the Sud department of Haiti. As of 2015, the population was 346,276 inhabitants. Postal codes in the Les Cayes Arrondissement start with the number 81.

The arrondissement consists of the following municipalities:

- Les Cayes
- Camp-Perrin
- Chantal
- Île-à-Vache (island)
- Maniche
- Torbeck
