= Aquin Arrondissement =

Coordinates: 18°16′50″N 73°23′47″W

Aquin Arrondissement Arrondissement d'Aquin Awondisman Aken
- Arrondissement
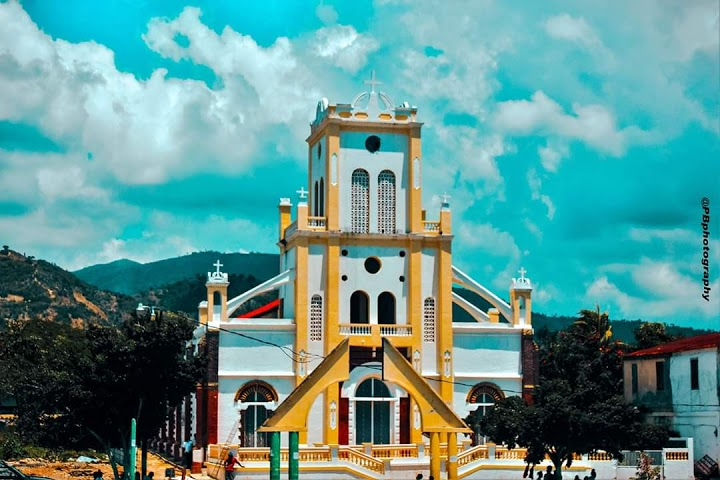
- A Catholic Church in Aquin
- Interactive map of Aquin Arrondissement
- Country: Haiti
- Department: Sud

Area
  - Arrondissement: 1,039.27 km^{2} (401.26 sq mi)
  - Urban: 5.04 km^{2} (1.95 sq mi)
  - Rural: 1,034.23 km^{2} (399.32 sq mi)

Population (2015)
  - Arrondissement: 217,827
  - Density: 209.596/km^{2} (542.852/sq mi)
  - Urban: 19,446
  - Rural: 198,381
- Time zone: UTC-5 (Eastern)
- Postal code: HT83—
- Communes: 3
- Communal Sections: 23
- IHSI Code: 073

Aquin (Haitian Creole: Aken) is an arrondissement in the Sud Department of Haiti. As of 2015, the population was 217,827 inhabitants. Postal codes in the Aquin Arrondissement start with the number 83.

It contains the following communes:

- Aquin
- Cavaillon
- Saint-Louis du Sud
