= Sud (department) =

Department of Haiti

Coordinates: 18.2°N 73.75°W

Sud Sid
- Department
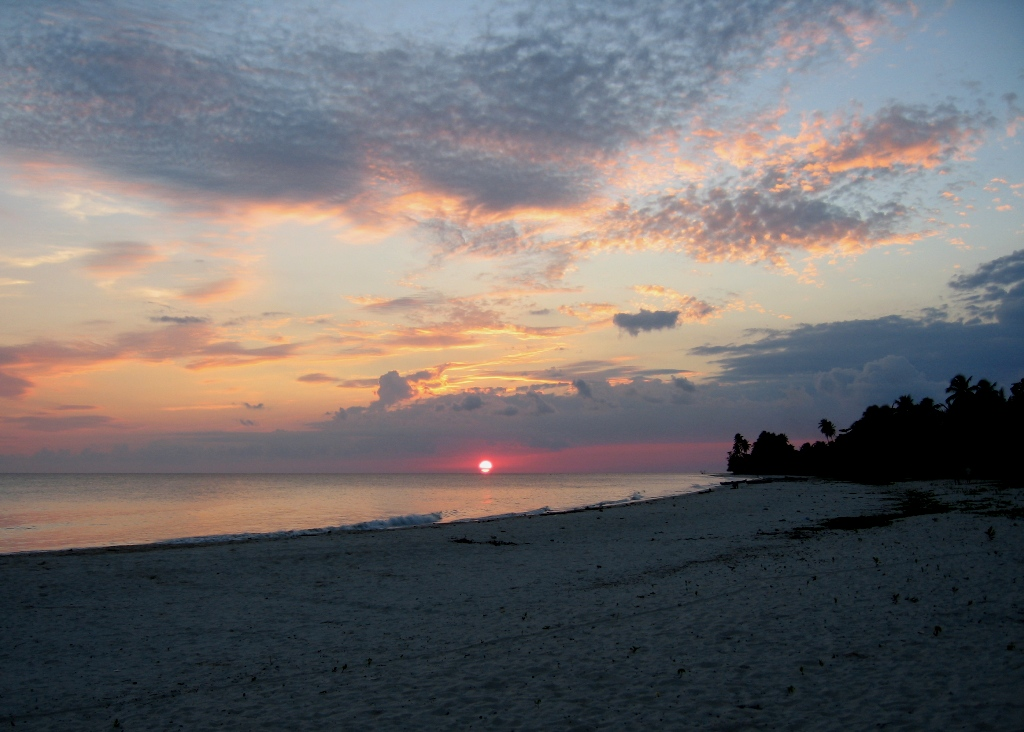
- Port Salut

- Sud in Haiti
- Country: Haiti
- Capital: Les Cayes
- Region: The Tiburon Peninsula
- Symbole: Zombia antillarum and tower

Government
  - Type: Departmental Council

Area
  - Department: 2,653.60 km^{2} (1,024.56 sq mi)

Population (2015)
  - Department: 774,976
  - Density: 292.047/km^{2} (756.398/sq mi)
  - Urban: 176,485
  - Rural: 598,491
- Time zone: UTC-05:00 (EST)
  - Summer (DST): UTC-04:00 (EDT)
- ISO 3166 code: HT-SD
- HDI (2022): 0.520 low · 3rd

Sud (French, pronounced [syd]) or Sid (Haitian Creole; both meaning "South") is one of the ten departments of Haiti and located in southern Haiti. It has an area of 2,653.60 square kilometres (1,024.56 sq mi) and a population of 774,976. Its capital is Les Cayes.

== History ==
=== Taino Period ===
The department was part of the Xaragua kingdom. The area of Aquin was known as Yakimo a Taino settlement. The island of Vache was named Anigua.

=== Spanish Period ===
The area of Les Cayes was a Spanish settlement known as Salvatierra de la Sabana or Land Saved from the Water or Sea.

=== French Period ===
Much like the N-O, the South Department was a pirate hub with famous pirates such as Henri Morgan and many more hiding their loot on the multitude of islands from Grosse Cayes to Isle-à-Vache.

=== Haitian Revolution ===
The South, in general, was Rigaudin since was under the control of André Rigaud until it definitely switches the hand of Toussaint and the Louverturien. This conflict is known as the Haitian War of Knives opposing two political and economical groups in Haiti even before independence: the Nouveaux-Libres and the Anciens-Libres.

In 1793 after The Great North rebelled after the Bwa-Kayiman Congress, the South was the scene of a group of maroons taking control of a French post at the heights of Les Cayes in Platons and establish their camp. Those maroons were never captured and went higher to Macaya at the attack of the Expedition Troops.

The alliance between the Rigaudin and Louverturien was consolidated at the Congress of Camp-Gerrard, on July 5, 1803, where Dessalines became the leader of the Indigènes Army. Boisrond Tonnerre became a member of Dessalines état-major and Nicolas Geffrard general of the South.

=== Haitian Period ===
On October 16, 1803, Nicolas Geffrard Sr. and Coco Herne freed the city of Les Cayes from the French expedition troops under the leadership of Brunet.

Nicolas Geffrard commander of the south and Coco Herne commander of Les Cayes are signatories of the Haitian Declaration of Independence. After the assassination of the Emperor, Haiti was divided into two de jure states, a monarchy and a republic. With the return of André Rigaud, the South became a distinct state separating from Port-au-Prince. With Michel Domingue, the south claimed separation again.

In 1843, the Manifest of Praslin with Charles Rivière Hérard overthrow the president Jean-Pierre Boyer.

== Demography ==
A significant part of the population in this department is of mixed race, people of Arab descent and from the Indian subcontinent. These southern parts of Haiti are where many residents Europeans descended to during tense political turmoil and, in more recent years, have returned and settled alongside black Haitians. Nowadays, this area of the country has become one of the most racially diverse (excluding Port-au-Prince).

== Geography ==
The department is bordered to the north by the Grand'Anse and Nippes, to the west the Winward Passage connecting to Jamaica, south by the Caribbean Sea and to the east by the South-East Department. The Pic Macaya is an ecological reserve on the north side. The Port-Salut Peninsula extends into the Caribbean Sea. From Flamand to Aquin there is a multitude of minor bays. The south is the province with the most islands, cays, and reefs giving it a particular charm and unique scenery. Some of the notable islands are:

- Isle-à-Vache
- Boyer
- Moustique
- Ramier
- Grosse-Caye

Locals call them zilè (islands) versus granntè (mainland)

Many rivers cross through the South notably

- La Ravine du Sud
- Cavaillon

Grotte Marijàn's Cave is the biggest in Haiti and one of the biggest in the Caribbean.

== Economy ==
=== Agriculture ===
The heart of the department is la Plaine des Cayes one of Haiti's biggest plains, where farmers grow notably rice Many families leave with fishing activities transforming multiple cays into seasonal fishermen settlements.

=== Tourism ===
The South is reputed of having some of Haiti's most pristine beaches such as:

- Port-Salut
- Gelée

== Transport ==
The main road through the department is the RN2 connecting Okay to Miragwàn and Pòtoprens The RD203 connects to Jacmel. The RD205 connects to Tiburon.

Les Cayes is a major port town.

Due to political troubles in Port-au-Prince, many locals are considering a port and oil terminal in St-Louis du Sud, making the South completely autonomous.

Les Cayes has an international airport Antoine-Simon, which has the potential for International flights connecting Haiti to Jamaica and Venezuela.

Isle-à-Vache has an airport strip and heliport.

== Administrative divisions ==
The Department of Sud is subdivided into five arrondissements, which are further subdivided into nineteen communes.

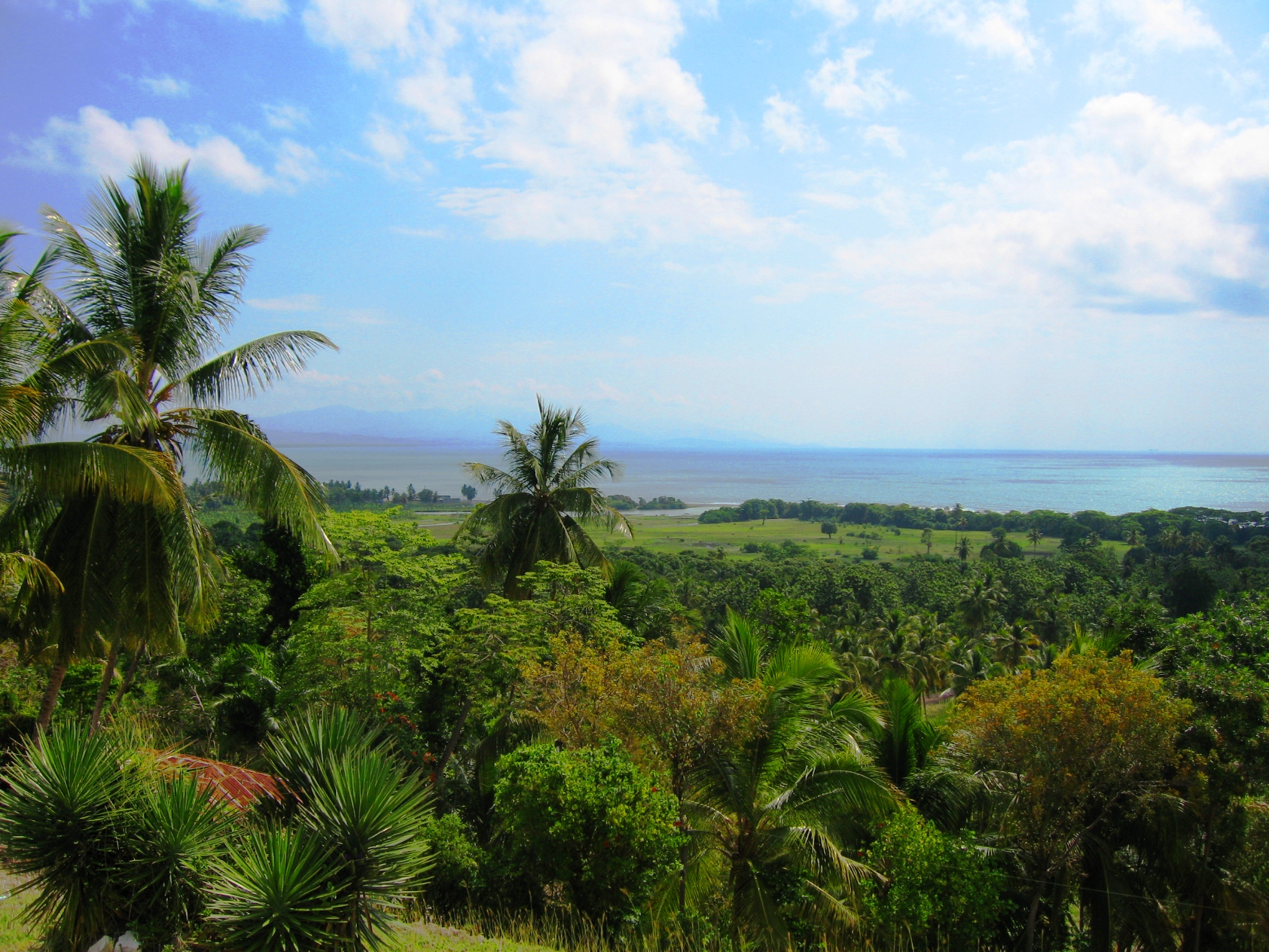
Les Cayes, Haiti

- Aquin Arrondissement
  - Aquin
  - Cavaillon
  - Saint-Louis du Sud
- Chardonnières Arrondissement
  - Chardonnières
  - Les Anglais
  - Tiburon
- Côteaux Arrondissement
  - Côteaux
  - Port-à-Piment
  - Roche-à-Bateaux
- Les Cayes Arrondissement
  - Les Cayes
  - Camp-Perrin
  - Chantal
  - Île à Vache (island)
  - Maniche
  - Torbeck
- Port-Salut Arrondissement
  - Port-Salut
  - Arniquet
  - Saint-Jean-du-Sud
