= Solar Electric Light Fund =

Solar power

- Founded: 1990
- Founder: Neville Williams
- Location: Washington DC
- Region served: Global
- Services: solar electrification, carbon offsets
- Fields: International development, health, education, agriculture, renewable energy
- Key people: Robert Freling (Executive Director)
- Website: www.self.org

The Solar Electric Light Fund (SELF) is a non-profit organization whose mission is to design, fund and implement solar energy solutions to benefit those in poor rural communities without access to an electrical grid. This allows students to study at night and brings computers and Internet into schools. It makes it possible to bring in water for irrigation without having to hand-carry it long distances, allowing women to spend their time on money-earning enterprises. Access to electricity and water improves health care. SELF has completed several projects in more than 20 countries including a solar powered drip irrigation in Benin, a health care center in Haiti, telemedicine in the Amazon rainforest, online learning platform in South Africa, and a microenterprise development in Nigeria.

== Methodology ==
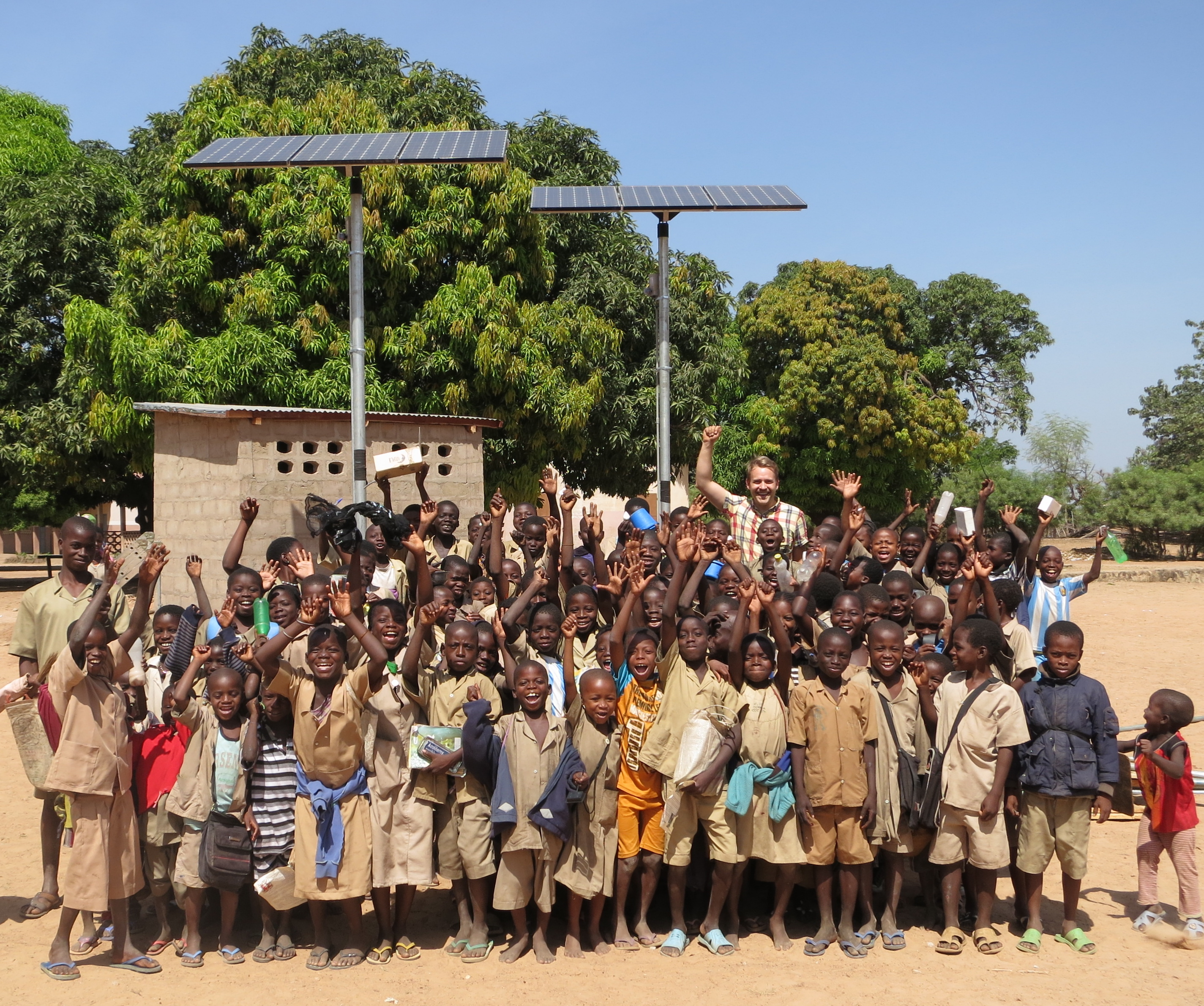
Darren Anderson, SELF project manager, and a group of students from the village of Bessassi in northern Benin celebrate the installation of solar systems that will provide electricity to their school.

SELF employs a Whole Village Development Model using a mix of solar energy solutions to improve the lives of the 1.5 billion people who don't have access to electricity around the world. It seeks to provide benefits in:

- Education: powering lights, computers and wireless internet services.
- Health: powering facility lights, labs, diagnostic equipment and vaccine refrigerators.
- Water & Agriculture: powering water wells and pumps for clean drinking water and year-round crop irrigation.
- Enterprise: powering centers for small businesses and providing electricity for machinery and equipment.
- Community: electrifying homes, community centers and street lighting.

== History ==
=== Founding ===
SELF was founded in 1990 by Neville Williams, a journalist and author, who had experience actively promoting solar power as a consultant to the United States Department of Energy during the Carter administration. For much of the 1990s, SELF's primary mission was to deliver solar home systems – 50-watt units installed at the household level that could generate enough power to run a few compact fluorescent lights, a radio, and a small black and white television for four or five hours each evening. The electricity generated by the solar panel is stored in a battery, which then provides power at night and during rainy weather.

In its early projects, SELF used funds donated by private philanthropies to buy home-size photovoltaic systems in bulk on the open market, usually enough for one small village at a time. SELF then sold the systems to villagers in developing areas, in partnership, where possible, with in-country nonprofit agencies. Each participating household made a 20 percent down payment on a solar energy system and paid off the balance – usually between $300 and $400 – over several years. The buyers' payments were pooled in a local revolving loan fund from which their neighbors could borrow to buy their own solar power gear. SELF used a portion of the proceeds on the equipment to establish a local dealership and train residents as solar installers and technicians. The revolving loan funds made it possible for villagers to finance the continued dissemination of solar systems in their areas.

=== Focusing on the Home & Creating SELCO ===
Over time, SELF began to evolve more elaborate project structures. In a joint venture with local partners in India, SELF formed a for-profit subsidiary using India's Ministry of New and Renewable Energy to tap World Bank funds set aside specifically for photovoltaic installations. In part, the company used the money to finance rural co-ops' bulk purchase of solar-energy systems for their members, to install the systems, and to train local technicians. The company then repaid the World Bank's loan from funds collected from the co-ops.

In 1997, SELF decided to launch a for-profit affiliate, the Solar Electric Light Company, or SELCO, based in Bangalore, India, whose goal would be to sell solar home systems in the states of Karnataka and Andhra Pradesh. Neville Williams stepped down from his role with SELF to run SELCO, and SELF's board of directors appointed Robert A. Freling as the new executive director. Since 1995, SELCO has sold, serviced, and financed over 115,000 solar systems.

=== Expanding Services ===
Beginning in 2000, SELF embarked on its next generation of projects that would seek to harness solar energy for things such as advancing water pumping and purification, purveying electrification to rural schools and health clinics, providing power to small businesses and micro-enterprises, and facilitating communication access.

The first opportunity to fulfill this expanded vision was found in South Africa, where SELF had been working on a project to install solar home systems in the Valley of a Thousand Hills, in the province of KwaZulu-Natal. SELF installed a 2.4-kilowatt solar array, which generated enough electricity to power approximately 20 PCs donated by Dell Computers and a small satellite dish that delivered Internet access to Myeka High School. This was the first solar-powered computer lab built in South Africa, and the pass rate at Myeka High School jumped from 30 percent to 70 percent within a year and a half of installation.

=== Whole Village Development Model ===
In 2003, SELF found the opportunity to implement a "Whole-Village" approach when the United States Department of Energy (DOE) invited SELF to carry out a solar electrification project in Nigeria. With support from the DOE, SELF equipped three villages in Jigawa State, in northern Nigeria, with solar power systems for a community water-pumping system, a health clinic, a primary school, street lighting, a portable irrigation pump, and a micro-enterprise center. Since then, SELF has continued to implement this model in other project countries.

=== Past Projects ===
SELF has worked in over 20 countries, using solar energy to power health clinics, schools, community centers, water pumps, mosques, drip irrigation, streetlights, and micro-enterprise centers. In addition to its current project sites, SELF has worked in Bhutan, Brazil, Burundi, China, India, Indonesia, Kenya, Lesotho, the Navajo Nation, Nepal, Nigeria, Rwanda, the Solomon Islands, South Africa, Sri Lanka, Tanzania, Uganda, Vietnam, and Zimbabwe.

== Current Projects ==
=== Benin ===
In partnership with the International Crops Research Institute for the Semi-Arid Tropics (ICRISAT) and Association pour le Developpement Economique Social et Culturel de Kalalé (ADESCA), SELF has installed a total of eleven of its Solar Market Gardens™ (SMG), an innovative, unique solar-powered drip irrigation system, for women farming collectives in Dunkassa and Bessassi, two villages in the arid, northern part of the country.

A two-year study conducted by Stanford University's Program on Food Security and the Environment department appearing in the Proceedings of the National Academy of Sciences found that SELF's SMGs, "significantly augments both household income and nutritional intake, particularly during the dry season, and is cost effective compared to alternative technologies."

In addition to the SMGs, SELF has also installed three community water wells, streetlights, and solar systems to power two schools and a health center. In 2014, SELF finished the installation of a solar micro-grid that will power a micro-enterprise center in Bessassi, and construction of a second micro-enterprise center in Dunkassa is nearing completion. SELF's future plans include replicating the potable water pumping stations in two more villages, assessing the potential for vaccine refrigerators at solar-electrified clinics, preparing for a pilot internet café, and planning a solar home lantern program.

=== Haiti ===
After the 2010 earthquake, SELF and Partners In Health teamed to develop the Rebuilding Haiti Initiative to fully power ten health centers. SELF has also installed 100 solar powered streetlights in tent camps to increase safety, and in collaboration with NRG Energy and the Clinton Bush Haiti Fund, SELF has completed the Sun Lights the Way: Brightening Boucan-Carré project by installing solar systems to power a fish farm, 20 schools, a Solar Market Garden™, and a microenterprise center. The success of this project has increased the quality of education for students in remote areas and has contributed to ensuring year-round food security.

In 2013, SELF solarized an additional seven schools to serve nearly 2,000 students, and also installed 20 solar-powered streetlights around Boucan-Carré in dangerous areas. Currently, SELF is installing two solar micro-grids that will provide electricity to 15,000 people in Port-à-Piment, Côteaux, Roche-à-Bateaux, and Fe-Yo-Bien, to be completed in 2015.

=== Colombia ===
With support from Acción Social (a governmental agency in Colombia) and Microsoft, SELF conducted a week-long site assessment and determined that deploying solar electric systems for the indigenous Arhuaco, Kogi and Wiwa communities in the Sierra Nevada mountains of northern Colombia is feasible. The project, a part of the Cordon Ambiental y Tradicional de la Sierra Nevada de Santa Marta initiative led by Acción Social, is intended to power the health and educational facilities in the villages, along with community lighting systems at select locations.

SELF was selected as a Grand Challenges Explorations winner, an initiative funded by the Bill & Melinda Gates Foundation, for groundbreaking research in solar powered direct-drive freezers to support global health and development. To support immunization efforts at two remote village health posts in the mountains of Colombia's Sierra Nevada de Santa Marta, SELF successfully field-tested three solar powered direct-drive vaccine refrigerators and the first commercially available direct-drive, battery-free vaccine icepack freezer. Following the tests, the fridge and freezer were donated to the village of Sabana Crespo.

SELF is also working on plans to install a solar energy based microgrid in the village of Sabana Crespo to power coffee facilities, the village general store, a health care clinic which includes a new laboratory, and the village's school and cafeteria.

== Partnerships ==
In alphabetical order

- Alstom Foundation
- Clinton Bush Haiti Fund
- Dell Computers South Africa
- ExxonMobil
- Guadalcanal Rural Electrification Agency (GREA)
- Habitat for Humanity International
- Inter-American Development Bank
- International Crops Research Institute for the Semi-Arid Tropics (ICRISAT)
- Jane Goodall Institute
- Jigawa State government
- National Renewable Energy Laboratory
- NRG Energy
- Partners In Health
- Royal Society for Protection of Nature, Bhutan
- SolarWorld
- Stanford University, Institute for Food Security and the Environment
- SunPower Foundation
- United Nations Environment Programme
- United States Department of Energy
- Vietnam Women's Union (VWU)
- Village Health Works

== Awards ==
- 2011: Energy Institute Award for Best Community Initiative
- 2008: King Hussein Leadership Prize, presented to SELF executive director Robert Freling
- 2008: Named a Tech Awards Laureate by the Tech Museum of Innovation
- 2006: World Bank Development Marketplace Winner
- 2005: Chevron Conservation Award
- 2002: Tech Museum of Innovation Awards Finalist
- 1999: Templeton Award, Presented to SELF Board Member, Freeman Dyson
- 1998: Global Green Environmental Award

== Articles ==
- Wood, Elisa. "Doing Good by Doing Solar." Renewable Energy World Magazine, 12 July 2013. http://www.renewableenergyworld.com/rea/news/article/2013/07/doing-good-by-doing-solar
- Butler, Erin. "In India, SELCO Brings Solar Power to the People." The Christian Science Monitor, 15 Jan. 2013. https://www.csmonitor.com/World/Making-a-difference/Change-Agent/2013/0115/In-India-SELCO-brings-solar-power-to-the-people
- Taylor, Darren. "Solar Energy Illuminates Darkest Parts of Africa." Voice of America, 24 Aug. 2012. https://www.voanews.com/a/solar-energy-illuminates-darkest-parts-of-africa/1495451.html
- Fox, Zoe (April 23, 2012). "SELF Taps the Sun to Break the Cycle of Poverty". Mashable.
- Eaton, Joe. "Solar Energy Brings Food, Water, and Light to West Africa." National Geographic, 13 March 2012.
- Daniel, Trenton. "Haiti Bringing Electricity to Business-starved Projects." The Denver Post, 29 Feb. 2012. http://www.denverpost.com/nationworld/ci_20066574#ixzz1oSrH5NJp
- Duda, Steve. "Solar Brings Better Medical Care in Haiti." Earth Techling, 11 Nov. 2011. http://www.earthtechling.com/2011/11/solar-powers-better-medical-care-in-haiti/
