= Stanford Woods Institute for the Environment =

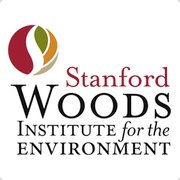

The Stanford Woods Institute for the Environment serves as Stanford University's environmental studies hub for faculty. An interdisciplinary research lab, Woods encompasses senior fellows and affiliated faculty as well as researchers, postdoctoral scholars, and students collaborating on sustainability research. It supports research in seven areas: climate, ecosystem services and conservation biology, food security, freshwater, oceans, public health, and sustainable development. It provides seed funding for environmental research and supports seven research centers, programs and workshops. In September 2022, it became part of the Stanford Doerr School of Sustainability.

== History ==
In the mid-1990s, a committee chaired by former Stanford president Donald Kennedy was appointed by provost Condoleezza Rice to evaluate environmental research. In 2000, its report proposed a coherent program to coordinate major efforts. As a result, president John L. Hennessy in 2003 announced a campus-wide initiative on the environment and sustainability. The following year he created the institute to serve as the initiative's centerpiece and focal point. Envisioned as a hub for environmental researchers, the Institute brought together experts from the university's seven schools to pursue interdisciplinary research addressing complex environmental challenges while attempting to prepare the next generation of environmental leaders. The community grew to more than 150 fellows, affiliated scholars, and researchers. In 2006, the Institute was formally renamed for Stanford trustee Ward W. Woods, a 1964 graduate, and his wife, Priscilla, who made a $30 million contribution.

== Environmental venture projects ==
The institute has chosen several high-risk projects to fund every year since 2004. Each environmental venture project (EVP) receives up to $100,000 per year.

Woods awarded $8.5 million to more than 50 projects in 24 countries through 2013, and recipients have received an additional $39 million in follow-on grants from outside sources.

EVP projects include:

- Low-cost mobile toilets: Stanford researchers developed a project called Sustainable Organic Integrated Livelihoods (SOIL), aimed at producing portable, low-cost toilets to help improve sanitation conditions in parts of Haiti with no sewers or running water while also improving the quality of agriculture land.
- Biodegradable plastic: Another team used its EVP to develop a wood substitute made from hemp fibers and a biodegradable plastic resin called polyhydroxybutyrate. This wood-and-plastic substitute has the potential to save trees, reduce greenhouse gases and shrink landfills.
- Pumping water with sunlight: a team led by professor Rosamond Naylor monitored a solar-powered drip-irrigation system put in place in two rural villages in northern Benin by Solar Electric Light Fund. As a result of these solar irrigation pumps, incomes in the two villages shot up, as did nutrition levels.

Research sponsored by Woods led to innovations including solar energy pumps used to water crops in the developing world, new technology that removes pathogens from wastewater and the introduction of government policies for drinking water access in sub-Saharan Africa.

== Other programs ==
The Woods Institute is also involved in educational and leadership programs, such as:

- The Leopold Leadership Program which trains academic researchers to take new approaches to learning, as well as to effectively communicate their work to businesses, political leaders and students. It was created in 1998 (named for Aldo Leopold) and moved to the Woods Institute in 2005.
- Mel Lane Student Grants: These are grants of between $500 and $3,000 awarded to Stanford students to work on environmental projects in addition to their required coursework.
- Rising Environmental Leaders Program, a one-week training camp that takes place in Washington, D.C. Participants learn about policy development, partnership building and public service careers.
- Mentoring Undergraduates in Interdisciplinary Research (MUIR), which provides a stipend to Stanford undergraduate students conducting interdisciplinary research who are also enrolled part or full-time in summer school. Students need to work closely with a faculty member who is willing to apply on their behalf.
- Stanford Interdisciplinary Graduate Fellowships (SIGF), competitive awards for a three-year Stanford fellowship. It is given to doctoral students who work on interdisciplinary research involving the humanities, the natural world and social sciences.
- Young Environmental Scholars (YES) conference, organized by Stanford postgraduate students and postdoctoral scholars aimed at bringing environmental researchers from all seven schools together to create a dialogue about environmental policy, behavior and norms research.
- Stanford students accepted into the Goldman Honors Program must study environmental science, technology and policy, with a concentration in one of these disciplines. During their senior year, the students create and implement a project that addresses an environmental challenge.
