= Dolian =

- Village
- Location in Haiti
- Coordinates: 18°17′01″N 74°05′50″W
- Country: Haiti
- Department: Sud
- Arrondissement: Côtaeux
- Elevation: 106 m (348 ft)
- Time zone: UTC−05:00 (EST)
  - Summer (DST): UTC−04:00 (EDT)

Dolian is a village in the Port-à-Piment commune of the Côteaux Arrondissement, in the Sud department of Haiti.

== See also ==
- Port-à-Piment
