= Dépas =

- Village
- Location in Haiti
- Coordinates: 18.2186291°N 74.054085°W
- Country: Haiti
- Department: Sud
- Arrondissement: Côteaux
- Elevation: 13 m (43 ft)

Dépas is a village in the Côteaux commune of the Côteaux Arrondissement, in the Sud department of Haiti.

== See also ==
- Côteaux
- Lan Beurte
