= Lan Beurte =

- Village
- Location in Haiti
- Coordinates: 18.1875212°N 74.0144035°W
- Country: Haiti
- Department: Sud
- Arrondissement: Côteaux
- Elevation: 13 m (43 ft)

Lan Beurte is a village in the Côteaux commune of the Côteaux Arrondissement, in the Sud department of Haiti.

== See also ==
- Côteaux
- Dépas
