= Ti Nance =

Dolian
- Village
- Location in Haiti
- Coordinates: 18.1894°N 73.9735°W
- Country: Haiti
- Department: Sud
- Arrondissement: Côteaux
- Elevation: 204 m (669 ft)

Dolian is a rural settlement in the Roche-à-Bateaux commune of the Côteaux Arrondissement, in the Sud department of Haiti.

== See also ==
- Debaucher
- Roche-à-Bateaux
