= Debaucher, Haiti =

Debaucher
- Village
- Location in Haiti
- Coordinates: 18.218121°N 73.9781409°W
- Country: Haiti
- Department: Sud
- Arrondissement: Côteaux
- Elevation: 315 m (1,033 ft)

Debaucher is a village in the Roche-à-Bateaux commune of the Côteaux Arrondissement, in the Sud department of Haiti.

== See also ==
- Ti Nance
- Roche-à-Bateaux
