= Nuna 7 =

2013 Dutch solar-powered racing car model

Nuna7 is a solar-powered racing car in the Nuna series built by the Dutch Nuon Solar Team. The team finished first with Nuna7 at the World Solar Challenge 2013, a race of 3000 km through the outback of Australia. The Nuon Solar Team consisted of 16 students of Delft University of Technology.

== World Solar Challenge 2013 - New regulations ==
The 2013 regulations had some major changes. All vehicles had to be designed with four wheels, and the driver compartment had to comply with new demands on safety. All teams had to rethink the design of their cars, Nuna7 was built as an asymmetric vehicle

== Specifications Nuna 7 ==
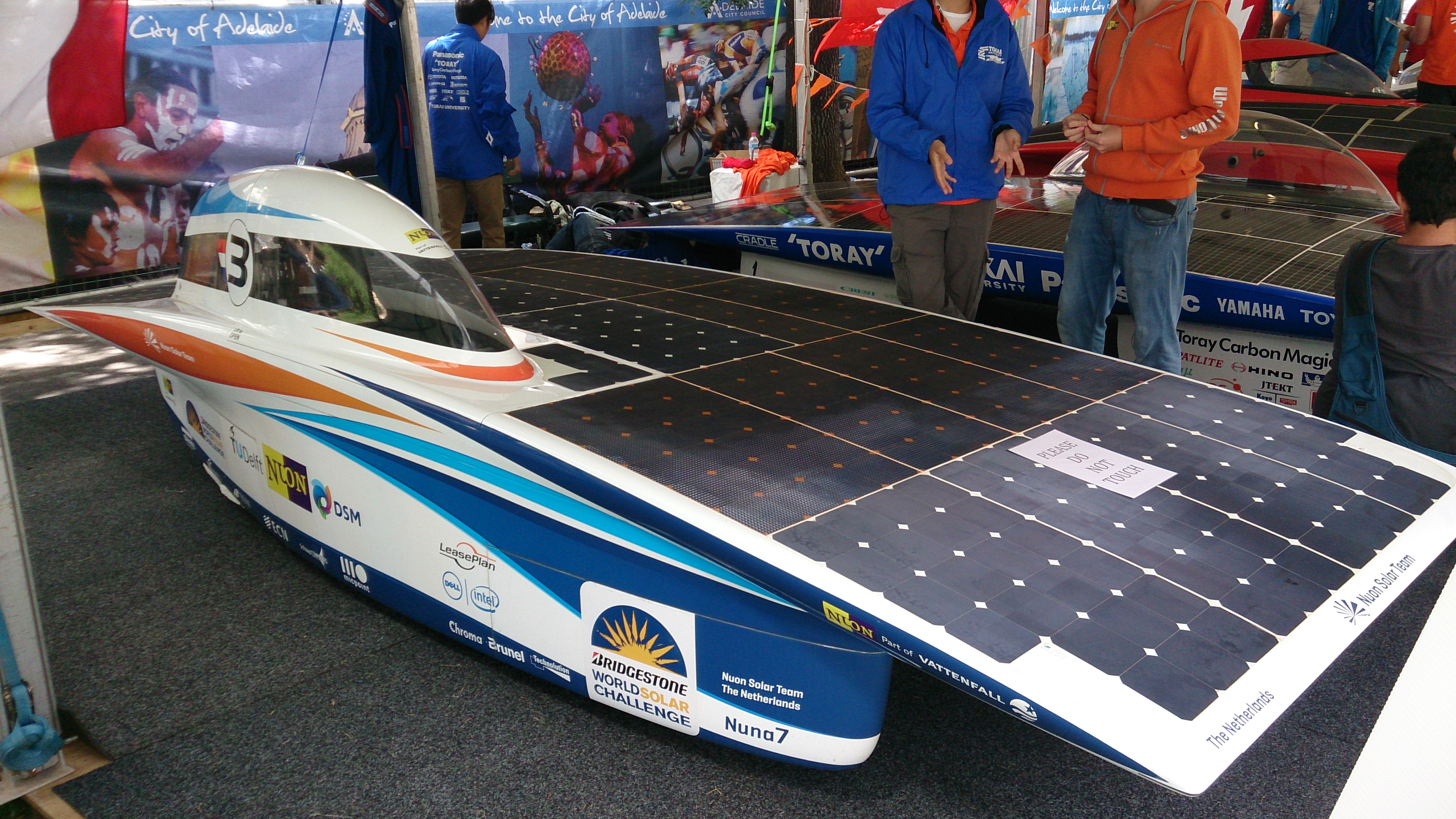
Nuna 7 at the finish of the 2013 Bridgestone World Solar Challenge

Size	Length: 4,5 m Width: 1,85 m Height: 1,12 m
Mass, without driver	190 kg
Driver	Minimum 80 kg (using added weights)
Number of wheels	4
Solar Cells	391 (Monocrystalline silicon solar cells)
Motor	CSIRO InWheel Direct Drive Electric engine
Battery	21 kg lithium-ion battery Capacity: 5.3 kWh
Body	Carbon fiber (textreme) with Twaron (aramidfibre) for parts that need extra driver protection / Titanium rollbar
Front wheel suspension	Leading arm suspension
Rear wheel suspension	Aluminium trailing arm with metal spring+shock absorber
Front brakes	Custom ceramic brakedisc / Aramid breaklines
Rear brakes	Regenerative brake
Tyres	(profiled tyres)
Rolling resistance	10 times less than an average car
Air resistance	12 times less than an average car. Design by R. Janssen.
Telemetry	WiFi to support car

== See also ==
- Nuna main article about the Nuna series of Dutch solar cars
- Solar car racing
- List of solar car teams
