= Port-à-Piment =

Port-à-Piment Pòtapiman disid (Haitian Creole)
- Commune
- Interactive map of Port-à-Piment
- Location in Haiti
- Coordinates: 18°15′0″N 74°6′0″W
- Country: Haiti
- Department: Sud
- Arrondissement: Côteaux

Area
  - Total: 60.28 km^{2} (23.27 sq mi)
- Elevation: 0 m (0 ft)

Population (2015)
  - Total: 18,922
  - Density: 313.9/km^{2} (813.0/sq mi)
- Time zone: UTC−05:00 (EST)
  - Summer (DST): UTC−04:00 (EDT)
- Postal code: HT 8420

Port-à-Piment (French pronunciation: [pɔʁ a pimɑ̃]; Haitian Creole: Pòtapiman disid) is a commune in the Côteaux Arrondissement, in the Sud department of Haiti. In 2009, the commune had a population of 17,207.

== Settlements ==
- Port-à-Piment
- Dolian
