= Solar energy use in rural Africa =

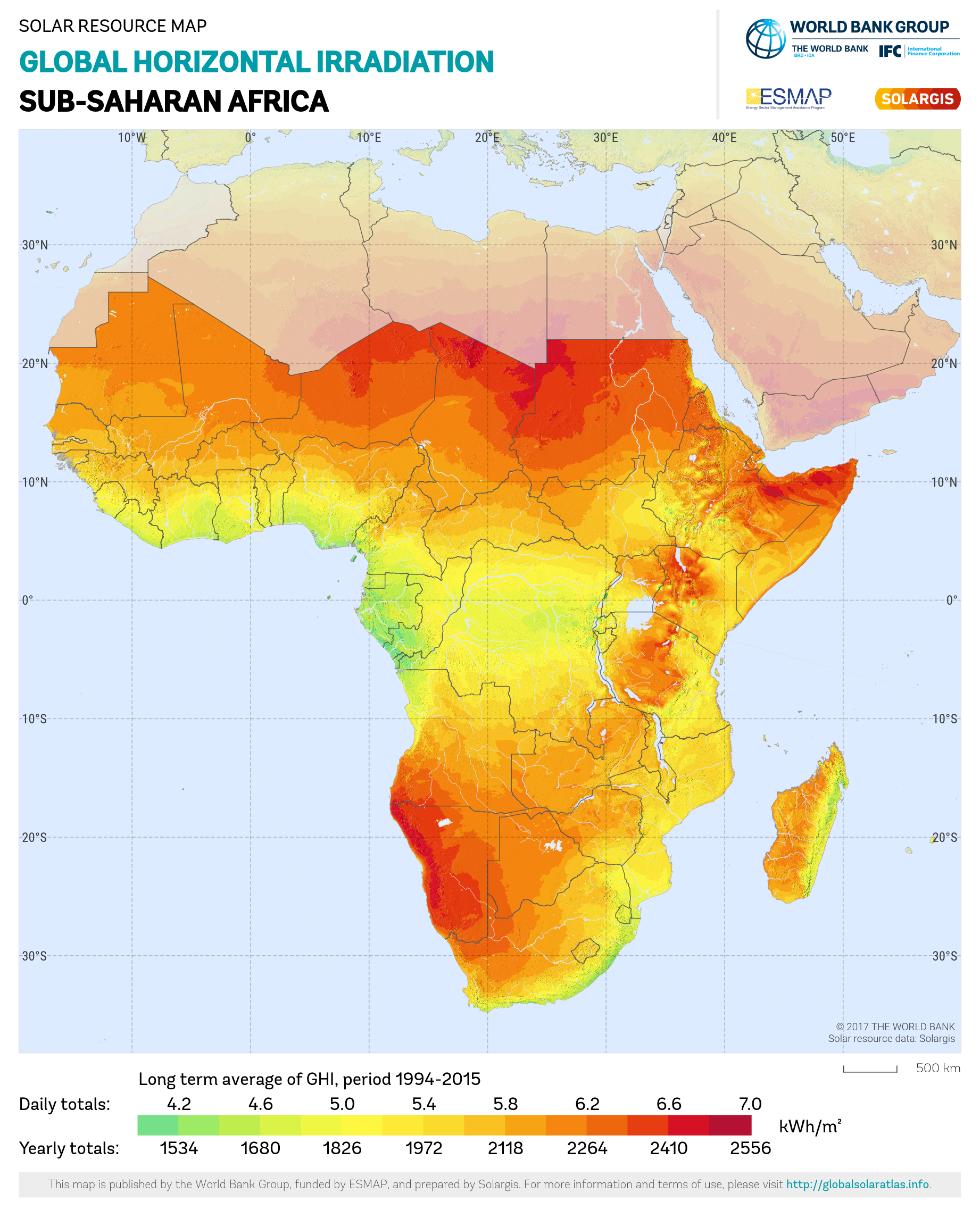
Global Horizontal Irradiation in Sub-Saharan Africa.

The use of solar energy in rural areas across sub-Saharan Africa has increased over the years. With many communities lacking access to basic necessities such as electricity, clean water, and effective irrigation systems; the innovations in solar powered technologies have led to poverty alleviation projects that combine development strategies and environmental consciousness. Another use for solar energy that has gained momentum in rural African households (as well as some urban areas) is that of solar cooking. Historically, the high dependency on wood collection from depleting sources have resulted in serious environmental degradation and has been considered an extremely unsustainable practice when compared to the renewable attribute of solar powered cooking. There have also been recent links made between solar energy and increased food security in the region. African development projects, mostly in rural areas seem to be recognizing the real potential of renewable energy sources especially power derived from the sun.

== Solar cooking ==
The article by Hilde M. Toonen (2009) details the efforts carried out by the SUPO (Stichting voor Urbane Projecten in Ontwikkelingslanden) foundation that was established in 1977; when they began a solar cooking project in 2005 in the urban households of the Burkina Faso city of Ouagadougou: PESGO (Programme Energie Solaire Grand-Ouaga). The technology used was that of CooKit which is a cardboard panel cooker covered with aluminum foil. Sunrays are reflected towards a black pot which is placed in a thermo-resistant plastic bag. Temperatures from 70 _C to 90_C (160 F and 200 F) can be reached. The cardboard is foldable and weighs only 500 g (1 lb.), it is therefore easily stored. If the CooKit is kept dry and away from termites, the CooKit may last for several years. Considering its durability, the CooKit seems to be a good investment: the purchase costs are lower than the money people spend on firewood. The manufacturing of the CooKit is not difficult. Solar Cookers International published a construction manual (SCI, 2007c). A CooKit can be made in one or two hours and materials needed are cardboard, aluminum foil and non-toxic, water based glue (SCI, 2007c) (see Fig. 1). (Toonen, 2009).

Fig. 1 The CooKit

As mentioned above the CooKit aims to reduce the high dependency on firewood and charcoal for cooking purposes that proves to not only negatively affect the environment; but also put a strain on the finances of the individual households. However, the researchers involved in the SUPO foundation quickly realized that CooKit alone could not be as effective in replacing firewood; and that the use of a special plant oil extracted from the drought-resistant Jatropha plant would be the most complementary component to aid in the cooking process as a fuel substitute. The process of extraction is also very straightforward where an individual just needs to squeeze the plant to get the oil. According to SUPA the main reason for using Jatropha oil along with the CooKit is due to the unreliability of weather conditions; however there have not yet been any developments in creating an inexpensive stove to be used with the Jatropha oil but that a one-flame cooker is simply a prototype at this stage. The CooKit example shared here is only one adaptation to solar cooking technology and that further research reveals other innovations such as the Solar Fryer (Gallagher, 2011) and the original Solar Box Oven. Evidence has shown that although the main setbacks to solar cooking are the longer time it takes to prepare meals for families and that the dependency on favorable weather conditions means that one cannot use solar energy every day; it is a step in the right direction as it can at least alleviate the pressure currently being placed on the remaining scarce firewood resources.

== Solar-powered water purification ==
Purified water is a big issue facing many communities in the developing world in particular. Those in rural areas are usually too isolated for on-grid government-funded water pipe infrastructure to be built; and so the responsibility of getting clean water becomes that of the women and their children in the villages who have to walk long distances to water sources that are not necessarily the purest.

In the article by Sambwa et al. (2009), the authors highlight these issues and propose the integration of DC (Direct Current) Motors into solar powered water pumping technology. This is usually referred to as ‘Technology Transfer’ that the authors argue is a development concept, [that has been] conceived by the politicians and the general public in sub-Saharan Africa as the ability to purchase or acquire technological equipment. Coupled with ‘‘globalization and economic liberation’’, this trend has become contagious to the point that any segment of unserviceable technological equipment finds its way into the sub-region...They are grouped as: vehicles, house hold machinery, industrial equipment, and many more. The authors have identified these unserviceable equipment as an inestimable source of raw materials where DC motors have been extracted (recovered) for the purpose of being reconfigured as DC motors for driving water pumps. (Sambwa et al., 2009). The pump itself can be retrieved from washing machines or radiators of the generating set engines. Figure 2 below shows the end product of the DC Motor Drive Water Pump before it has been connected to the solar panels.

Fig. 2 DC motor drive water pump

However one of the main setbacks of relying on used imported technologies is that they prove to be problematic to local engineers and technicians as most of them have already worked for many years before being exported to the continent. (Sambwa et al., 2009). The project proved to be successful as it was able to pump water from a 10m deep water reservoir; but in order to fund future projects costs would have to be covered by external sources. In spite of the higher production costs, the overall benefit of utilizing this technology outweighs the proposed setbacks. And due to the relatively simplistic model, maintenance work that would arise in the future can be dealt with by the local technicians.

Researchers from King Abdullah University of Science and Technology in Saudi Arabia invented a device in 2019 that can produce solar electricity while simultaneously purifying water.

== Solar-powered drip irrigation system ==
In the article by Burney et al. (2010) another use for solar energy that has been proposed is the Photovoltaic- (or solar-) powered drip irrigation (PVDI) system [which] combines the efficiency of drip irrigation with the reliability of a solar-powered water pump... [Where the] PV array powers a pump (either surface or submersible, depending on the water source) that feeds water to a reservoir. The reservoir then gravity-distributes the water to a low-pressure drip irrigation system. No batteries are used in the system: The pump only runs during the daytime, and energy storage is in the height of the column of water in the reservoir. An important technological advancement for agricultural practices in the region that is related to increasing food security; the PVDI systems were integrated into preexisting local women's agricultural groups in the Kalalé District of Northern Benin in November 2007. The PVDI systems were conceived, financed, and installed by an NGO, the Solar Electric Light Fund, to boost vegetable production from communal gardens in an effort to combat high malnutrition and poverty levels in the region. (Burney et al., 2010).

== See also ==
- Ashden Awards for Sustainable Energy
- Energy for All
- Global Solar Atlas
- International Renewable Energy Agency
- Renewable energy in Africa
- Renewable energy in China
- Solar for all
- Solar power in South Asia
- Solar powered refrigerator
- SolarAid
- UN-Energy
