= Roche-à-Bateaux =

Roche-à-Bateau Wòchabato
- Commune
- Interactive map of Roche-à-Bateau
- Location in Haiti
- Coordinates: 18°10′54″N 74°00′10″W
- Country: Haiti
- Department: Sud
- Arrondissement: Côteaux

Area
  - Total: 46.24 km^{2} (17.85 sq mi)
- Elevation: 97 m (318 ft)

Population (2015)
  - Total: 18,394
  - Density: 397.8/km^{2} (1,030/sq mi)
- Time zone: UTC−05:00 (EST)
  - Summer (DST): UTC−04:00 (EDT)
- Postal code: HT 8430

Roche-à-Bateaux (French pronunciation: [ʁɔʃ a bato]; Haitian Creole: Wòchabato) is a commune in the Côteaux Arrondissement, in the Sud department of Haiti. In 2015, the commune had 18,394 residents.

== History ==
Roche-à-Bateaux was hit by a category 4 tropical storm in 2016, Hurricane Matthew directly passed over the Sud department of Haiti over the course of 36 minutes. 50 people were killed as a result of the 9.8ft (3m) storm surge which hit the coastal town, strong winds of 145mph also destroyed 62% of homes in the municipality.

== Settlements ==
- Debaucher
- Ti Nance
- Roche-à-Bateaux
