= Solar energy =

Radiant light and heat from the Sun, harnessed with technology

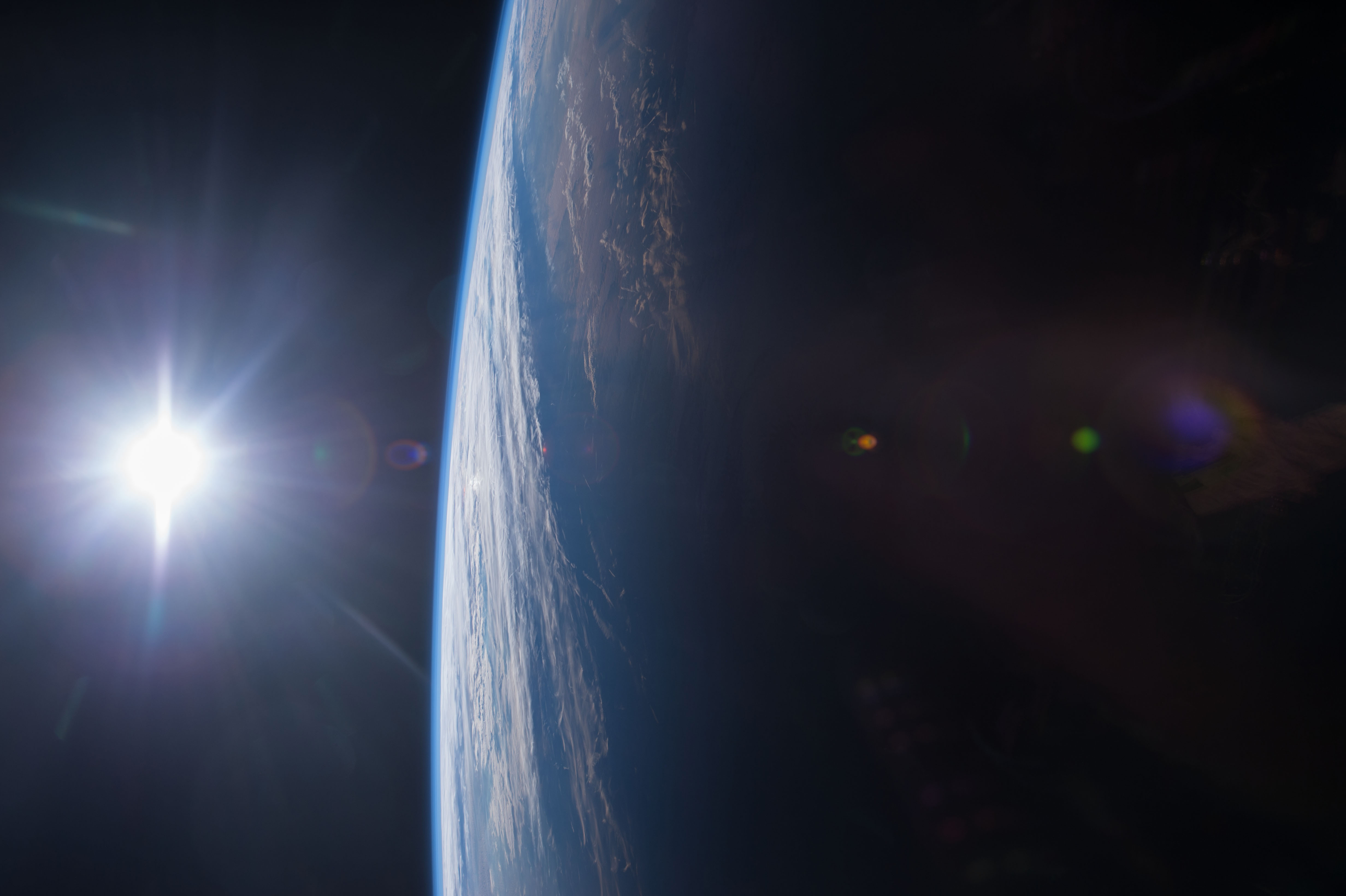
The Sun produces electromagnetic radiation that can be harnessed as useful energy.

Solar energy is the radiant energy from the Sun's light and heat, which can be harnessed using a range of technologies such as solar electricity, solar thermal energy (including solar water heating) and solar architecture. It is an essential source of renewable energy, and its technologies are broadly characterized as either passive solar or active solar depending on how they capture and distribute solar energy or convert it into solar power. Active solar techniques include the use of photovoltaic systems, concentrated solar power, and solar water heating to harness the energy. Passive solar techniques include designing a building for better daylighting, selecting materials with favorable thermal mass or light-dispersing properties, and organizing spaces that naturally circulate air.

In 2011, the International Energy Agency said that "the development of affordable, inexhaustible and clean solar energy technologies will have huge longer-term benefits. It will increase countries' energy security through reliance on an indigenous, inexhaustible, and mostly import-independent resource, enhance sustainability, reduce pollution, lower the costs of mitigating global warming .... these advantages are global".

== Potential ==
About half the incoming solar energy reaches the Earth's surface.

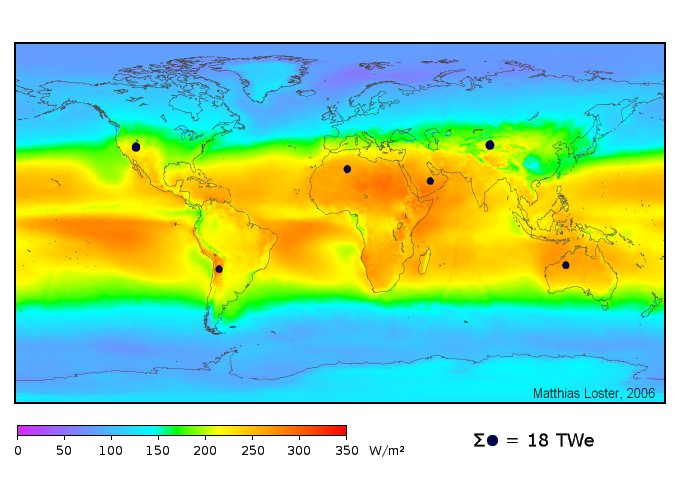
Average insolation. The theoretical area of the small black dots is sufficient to supply the world's total energy needs of 18 TW with solar power.

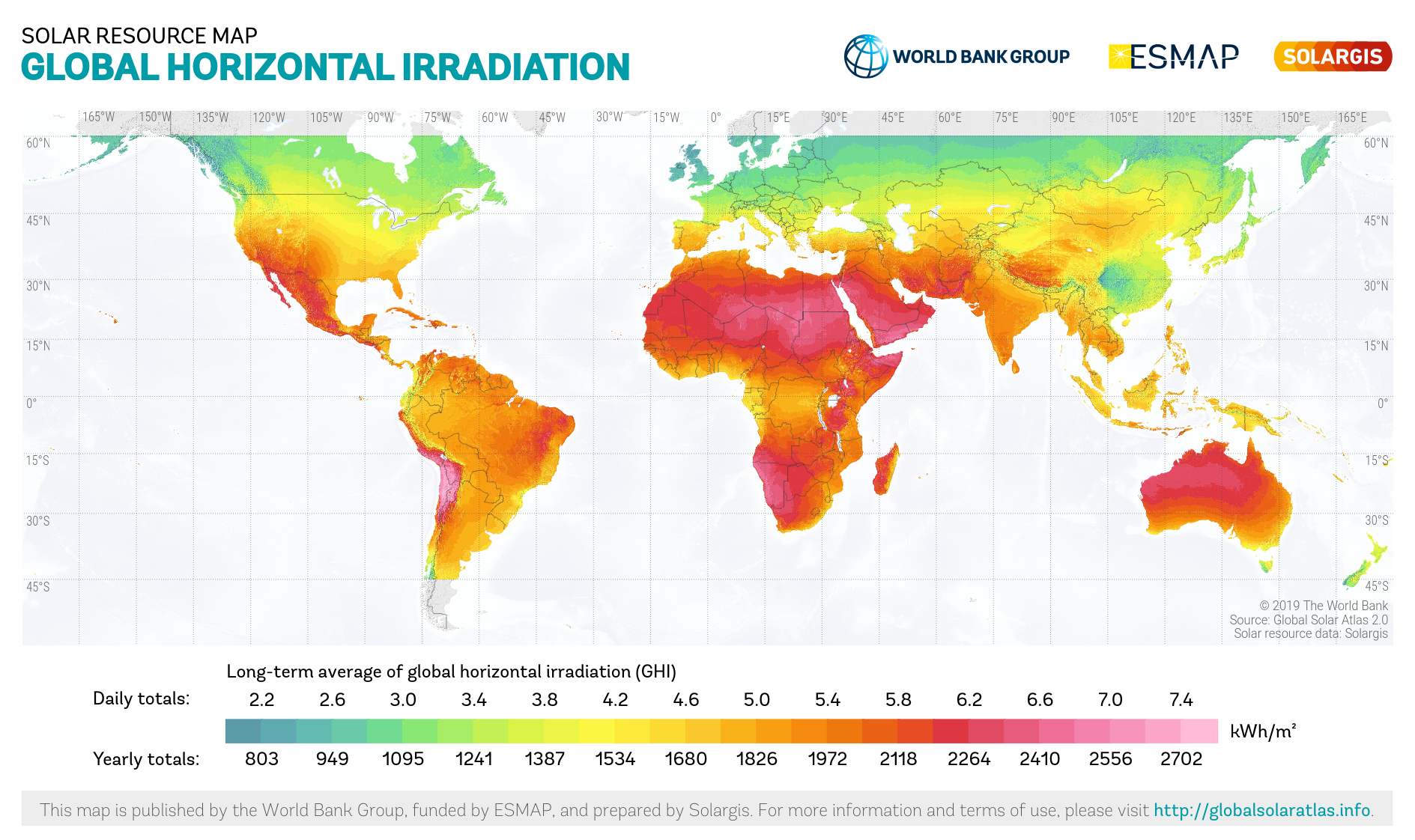
Global map of horizontal irradiation

The Earth receives 174 petawatts (PW) of incoming solar radiation (insolation) at the upper atmosphere. Approximately 30% is reflected back to space while the rest, 122 PW, is absorbed by clouds, oceans and land masses. The spectrum of solar light at the Earth's surface is mostly spread across the visible and near-infrared ranges with a small part in the near-ultraviolet. Most of the world's population live in areas with insolation levels of 150–300 watts/m^{2}, or 3.5–7.0 kWh/m^{2} per day.

Solar radiation is absorbed by the Earth's land surface, oceans – which cover about 71% of the globe – and atmosphere. Warm air containing evaporated water from the oceans rises, causing atmospheric circulation or convection. When the air reaches a high altitude, where the temperature is low, water vapor condenses into clouds, which rain onto the Earth's surface, completing the water cycle. The latent heat of water condensation amplifies convection, producing atmospheric phenomena such as wind, cyclones and anticyclones. Sunlight absorbed by the oceans and land masses keeps the surface at an average temperature of 14 °C. By photosynthesis, green plants convert solar energy into chemically stored energy, which produces food, wood and the biomass from which fossil fuels are derived.

The total solar energy absorbed by Earth's atmosphere, oceans and land masses is approximately 122 PW·year = 3,850,000 exajoules (EJ) per year. In 2002 (2019), this was more energy in one hour (one hour and 25 minutes) than the world used in one year. Photosynthesis captures approximately 3,000 EJ per year in biomass.

Yearly solar fluxes & human consumption^{1}
| Solar | 3,850,000 |
| Wind | 2,250 |
| Biomass potential | ~200 |
| Primary energy use^{2} | 633 |
| Electricity^{2} | ~86 |
^{1} Energy given in Exajoule (EJ) = 10^{18} J = 278 TWh^{2} Consumption as of year 2019

The potential solar energy that could be used by humans differs from the amount of solar energy present near the surface of the planet because factors such as geography, time variation, cloud cover, and the land available to humans limit the amount of solar energy that we can acquire. In 2021, Carbon Tracker Initiative estimated the land area needed to generate all our energy from solar alone was 450,000 km^{2} — or about the same as the area of Sweden, or the area of Morocco, or the area of California (0.3% of the Earth's total land area).

Solar technologies are categorized as either passive or active depending on the way they capture, convert and distribute sunlight and enable solar energy to be harnessed at different levels around the world, mostly depending on the distance from the Equator. Although solar energy refers primarily to the use of solar radiation for practical ends, all types of renewable energy, other than geothermal power and tidal power, are derived either directly or indirectly from the Sun.

Active solar techniques use photovoltaics, concentrated solar power, solar thermal collectors, pumps, and fans to convert sunlight into useful output. Passive solar techniques include selecting materials with favorable thermal properties, designing spaces that naturally circulate air, and referencing the position of a building to the Sun. Active solar technologies increase the supply of energy and are considered supply side technologies, while passive solar technologies reduce the need for alternative resources and are generally considered demand-side technologies.

In 2000, the United Nations Development Programme, UN Department of Economic and Social Affairs, and World Energy Council published an estimate of the potential solar energy that could be used by humans each year. This took into account factors such as insolation, cloud cover, and the land that is usable by humans. It was stated that solar energy has a global potential of 1,600 to 49,800 exajoules (4.4×10^{14} to 1.4×10^{16} kWh) per year (see table below).

Annual solar energy potential by region (Exajoules)
| Region | North America | Latin America and Caribbean | Western Europe | Central and Eastern Europe | Former Soviet Union | Middle East and North Africa | Sub-Saharan Africa | Pacific Asia | South Asia | Centrally planned Asia | Pacific OECD |
|---|---|---|---|---|---|---|---|---|---|---|---|
| Minimum | 181.1 | 112.6 | 25.1 | 4.5 | 199.3 | 412.4 | 371.9 | 41.0 | 38.8 | 115.5 | 72.6 |
| Maximum | 7,410 | 3,385 | 914 | 154 | 8,655 | 11,060 | 9,528 | 994 | 1,339 | 4,135 | 2,263 |
Notes: Total global annual solar energy potential amounts to 1,575 EJ (minimum) to 49,837 EJ (maximum); Data reflects assumptions of annual clear sky irradiance, annual average sky clearance, and available land area. All figures given in Exajoules.; Quantitative relation of global solar potential vs. the world's primary energy consumption: Ratio of potential vs. current consumption (402 EJ) as of year: 3.9 (minimum) to 124 (maximum); Ratio of potential vs. projected consumption by 2050 (590–1,050 EJ): 1.5–2.7 (minimum) to 47–84 (maximum); Ratio of potential vs. projected consumption by 2100 (880–1,900 EJ): 0.8–1.8 (minimum) to 26–57 (maximum); Source: United Nations Development Programme – World Energy Assessment (2000)

== Thermal energy ==
Solar thermal technologies can be used for water heating, space heating, space cooling and process heat generation.

=== Early commercial adaptation ===
In 1878, at the Universal Exposition in Paris, Augustin Mouchot successfully demonstrated a solar steam engine but could not continue development because of cheap coal and other factors.

1917 patent drawing of Shuman's solar collector

In 1897, Frank Shuman, a US inventor, engineer and solar energy pioneer built a small demonstration solar engine that worked by reflecting solar energy onto square boxes filled with ether, which has a lower boiling point than water and were fitted internally with black pipes which in turn powered a steam engine. In 1908 Shuman formed the Sun Power Company with the intent of building larger solar power plants. He, along with his technical advisor A.S.E. Ackermann and British physicist Sir Charles Vernon Boys, developed an improved system using mirrors to reflect solar energy upon collector boxes, increasing heating capacity to the extent that water could now be used instead of ether. Shuman then constructed a full-scale steam engine powered by low-pressure water, enabling him to patent the entire solar engine system by 1912.

Shuman built the world's first solar thermal power station in Maadi, Egypt, between 1912 and 1913. His plant used parabolic troughs to power a 45–52 kilowatts (60–70 hp) engine that pumped more than 22,000 litres (4,800 imp gal; 5,800 US gal) of water per minute from the Nile River to adjacent cotton fields. Although the outbreak of World War I and the discovery of cheap oil in the 1930s discouraged the advancement of solar energy, Shuman's vision, and basic design were resurrected in the 1970s with a new wave of interest in solar thermal energy. In 1916 Shuman was quoted in the media advocating solar energy's utilization, saying:

We have proved the commercial profit of sun power in the tropics and have more particularly proved that after our stores of oil and coal are exhausted the human race can receive unlimited power from the rays of the Sun.

— Frank Shuman, New York Times, 2 July 1916

=== Water heating ===
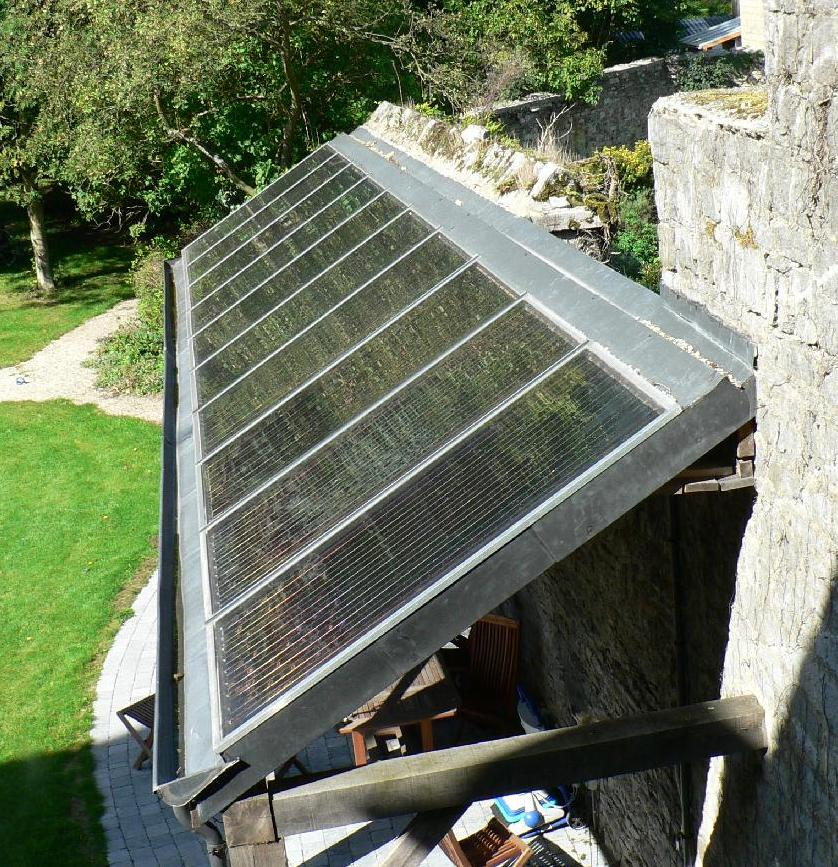
Solar water heaters facing the Sun to maximize gain

Solar hot water systems use sunlight to heat water. In middle geographical latitudes (between 40 degrees north and 40 degrees south), 60 to 70% of the domestic hot water use, with water temperatures up to 60 °C (140 °F), can be provided by solar heating systems. The most common types of solar water heaters are evacuated tube collectors (44%) and glazed flat plate collectors (34%) generally used for domestic hot water; and unglazed plastic collectors (21%) used mainly to heat swimming pools.

As of 2015, the total installed capacity of solar hot water systems was approximately 436 thermal gigawatt (GW_{th}), and China is the world leader in their deployment with 309 GW_{th} installed, taken up 71% of the market. Israel and Cyprus are the per capita leaders in the use of solar hot water systems with over 90% of homes using them. In the United States, Canada, and Australia, heating swimming pools is the dominant application of solar hot water with an installed capacity of 18 GW_{th} as of 2005.

=== Heating, cooling and ventilation ===
In the United States, heating, ventilation and air conditioning (HVAC) systems account for 30% (4.65 EJ/yr) of the energy used in commercial buildings and nearly 50% (10.1 EJ/yr) of the energy used in residential buildings. Solar heating, cooling and ventilation technologies can be used to offset a portion of this energy. Use of solar for heating can roughly be divided into passive solar concepts and active solar concepts, depending on whether active elements such as sun tracking and solar concentrator optics are used.

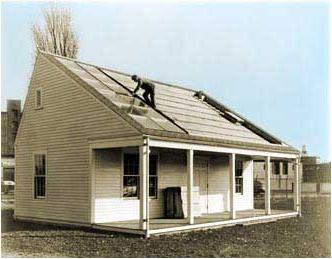
MIT's Solar House #1, built in 1939 in the US, used seasonal thermal energy storage for year-round heating.

Thermal mass is any material that can be used to store heat—heat from the Sun in the case of solar energy. Common thermal mass materials include stone, cement, and water. Historically they have been used in arid climates or warm temperate regions to keep buildings cool by absorbing solar energy during the day and radiating stored heat to the cooler atmosphere at night. However, they can be used in cold temperate areas to maintain warmth as well. The size and placement of thermal mass depend on several factors such as climate, daylighting, and shading conditions. When duly incorporated, thermal mass maintains space temperatures in a comfortable range and reduces the need for auxiliary heating and cooling equipment.

A solar chimney (or thermal chimney, in this context) is a passive solar ventilation system composed of a vertical shaft connecting the interior and exterior of a building. As the chimney warms, the air inside is heated, causing an updraft that pulls air through the building. Performance can be improved by using glazing and thermal mass materials in a way that mimics greenhouses.

Deciduous trees and plants have been promoted as a means of controlling solar heating and cooling. When planted on the southern side of a building in the northern hemisphere or the northern side in the southern hemisphere, their leaves provide shade during the summer, while the bare limbs allow light to pass during the winter. Since bare, leafless trees shade 1/3 to 1/2 of incident solar radiation, there is a balance between the benefits of summer shading and the corresponding loss of winter heating. In climates with significant heating loads, deciduous trees should not be planted on the Equator-facing side of a building because they will interfere with winter solar availability. They can, however, be used on the east and west sides to provide a degree of summer shading without appreciably affecting winter solar gain.

=== Cooking ===
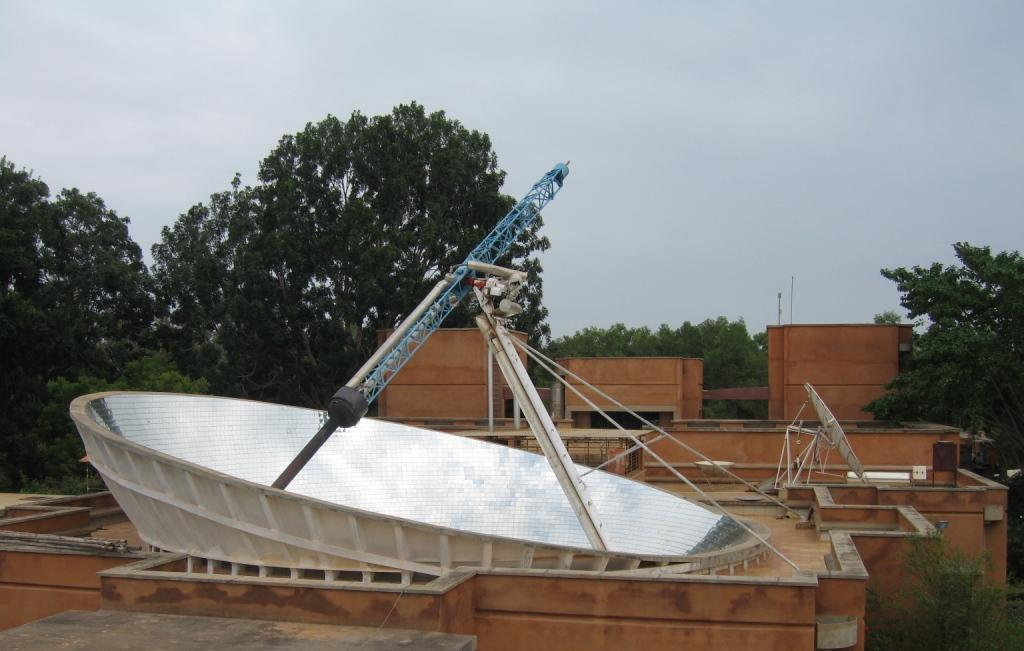
Parabolic dish produces steam for cooking, in Auroville, India.

Solar cookers use sunlight for cooking, drying, and pasteurization. They can be grouped into three broad categories: box cookers, panel cookers, and reflector cookers. The simplest solar cooker is the box cooker first built by Horace de Saussure in 1767. A basic box cooker consists of an insulated container with a transparent lid. It can be used effectively with partially overcast skies and will typically reach temperatures of 90–150 °C (194–302 °F). Panel cookers use a reflective panel to direct sunlight onto an insulated container and reach temperatures comparable to box cookers. Reflector cookers use various concentrating geometries (dish, trough, Fresnel mirrors) to focus light on a cooking container. These cookers reach temperatures of 315 °C (599 °F) and above but require direct light to function properly and must be repositioned to track the Sun.

=== Process heat ===
Solar concentrating technologies such as parabolic dish, trough and Scheffler reflectors can provide process heat for commercial and industrial applications. The first commercial system was the Solar Total Energy Project (STEP) in Shenandoah, Georgia, US where a field of 114 parabolic dishes provided 50% of the process heating, air conditioning and electrical requirements for a clothing factory. This grid-connected cogeneration system provided 400 kW of electricity plus thermal energy in the form of 401 kW steam and 468 kW chilled water and had a one-hour peak load thermal storage. Evaporation ponds are shallow pools that concentrate dissolved solids through evaporation. The use of evaporation ponds to obtain salt from seawater is one of the oldest applications of solar energy. Modern uses include concentrating brine solutions used in leach mining and removing dissolved solids from waste streams.

Clothes lines, clotheshorses, and clothes racks dry clothes through evaporation by wind and sunlight without consuming electricity or gas. In some states of the United States legislation protects the "right to dry" clothes. Unglazed transpired collectors (UTC) are perforated sun-facing walls used for preheating ventilation air. UTCs can raise the incoming air temperature up to 22 °C (40 °F) and deliver outlet temperatures of 45–60 °C (113–140 °F). The short payback period of transpired collectors (3 to 12 years) makes them a more cost-effective alternative than glazed collection systems. As of 2003, over 80 systems with a combined collector area of 35,000 square metres (380,000 sq ft) had been installed worldwide, including an 860 m^{2} (9,300 sq ft) collector in Costa Rica used for drying coffee beans and a 1,300 m^{2} (14,000 sq ft) collector in Coimbatore, India, used for drying marigolds.

=== Water treatment ===
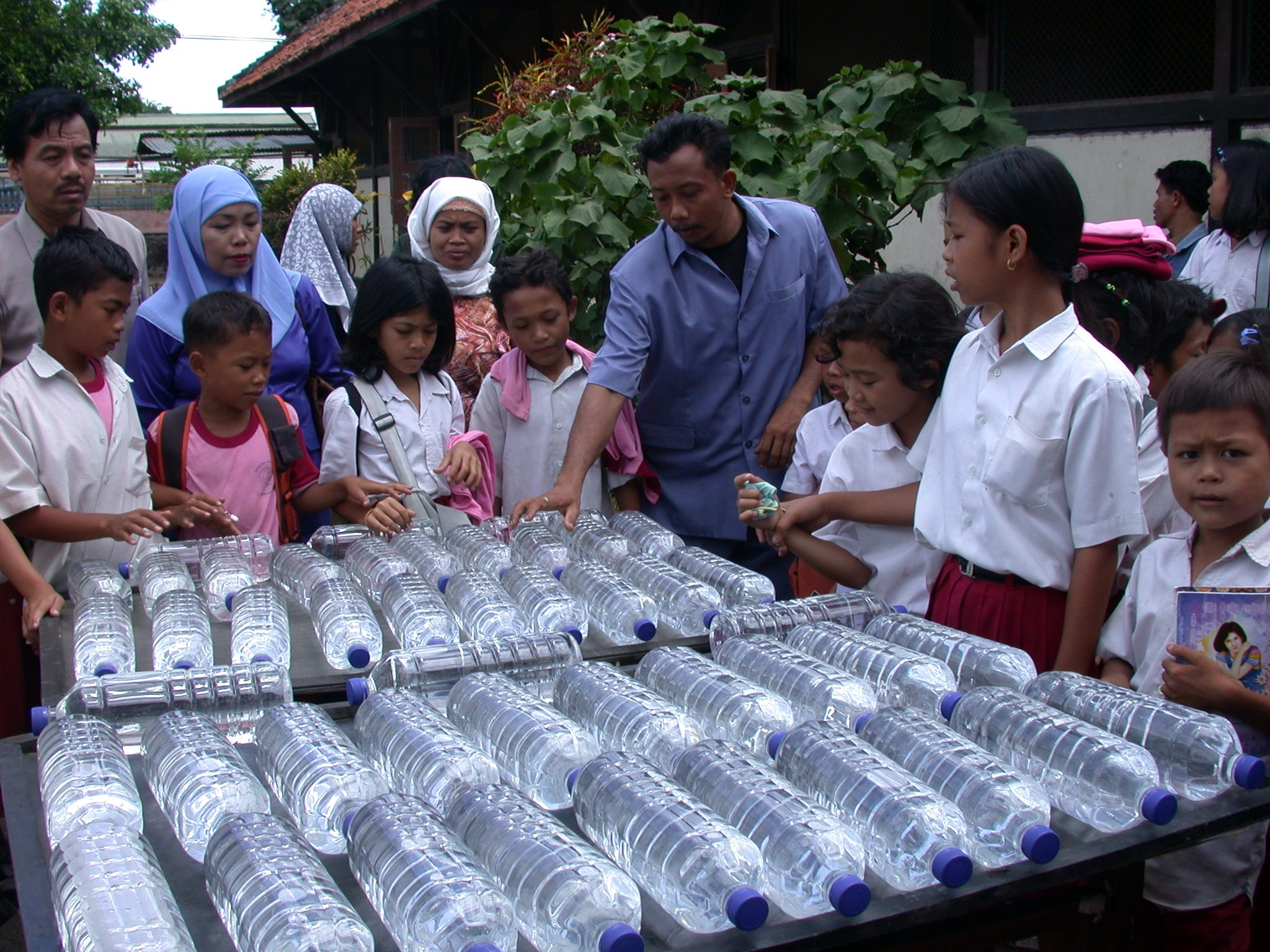
Solar water disinfection in Indonesia

Solar distillation can be used to make saline or brackish water potable. The first recorded instance of this was by 16th-century Arab alchemists. A large-scale solar distillation project was first constructed in 1872 in the Chilean mining town of Las Salinas. The plant, which had solar collection area of 4,700 m^{2} (51,000 sq ft), could produce up to 22,700 L (5,000 imp gal; 6,000 US gal) per day and operate for 40 years. Individual still designs include single-slope, double-slope (or greenhouse type), vertical, conical, inverted absorber, multi-wick, and multiple effect. These stills can operate in passive, active, or hybrid modes. Double-slope stills are the most economical for decentralized domestic purposes, while active multiple effect units are more suitable for large-scale applications.

Solar water disinfection (SODIS) involves exposing water-filled plastic polyethylene terephthalate (PET) bottles to sunlight for several hours. Exposure times vary depending on weather and climate from a minimum of six hours to two days during fully overcast conditions. It is recommended by the World Health Organization as a viable method for household water treatment and safe storage. Over two million people in developing countries use this method for their daily drinking water.

Solar energy may be used in a water stabilization pond to treat waste water without chemicals or electricity. A further environmental advantage is that algae grow in such ponds and consume carbon dioxide in photosynthesis, although algae may produce toxic chemicals that make the water unusable.

=== Molten salt technology ===
Molten salt can be employed as a thermal energy storage method to retain thermal energy collected by a solar tower or solar trough of a concentrated solar power plant so that it can be used to generate electricity in bad weather or at night. It was demonstrated in the Solar Two project from 1995 to 1999. The system is predicted to have an annual efficiency of 99%, a reference to the energy retained by storing heat before turning it into electricity, versus converting heat directly into electricity. The molten salt mixtures vary. The most extended mixture contains sodium nitrate, potassium nitrate and calcium nitrate. It is non-flammable and non-toxic, and has already been used in the chemical and metals industries as a heat-transport fluid. Hence, experience with such systems exists in non-solar applications.

The salt melts at 131 °C (268 °F). It is kept liquid at 288 °C (550 °F) in an insulated "cold" storage tank. The liquid salt is pumped through panels in a solar collector where the focused irradiance heats it to 566 °C (1,051 °F). It is then sent to a hot storage tank. This is so well insulated that the thermal energy can be usefully stored for up to a week.

When electricity is needed, the hot salt is pumped to a conventional steam-generator to produce superheated steam for a turbine/generator as used in any conventional coal, oil, or nuclear power plant. A 100-megawatt turbine would need a tank about 9.1 metres (30 ft) tall and 24 metres (79 ft) in diameter to drive it for four hours by this design.

Several parabolic trough power plants in Spain and solar power tower developer SolarReserve use this thermal energy storage concept. The Solana Generating Station in the U.S. has six hours of storage by molten salt. In Chile, The Cerro Dominador power plant has a 110 MW solar-thermal tower, the heat is transferred to molten salts. The molten salts then transfer their heat in a heat exchanger to water, generating superheated steam, which feeds a turbine that transforms the kinetic energy of the steam into electric energy using the Rankine cycle. In this way, the Cerro Dominador plant is capable of generating around 110 MW of power. The plant has an advanced storage system enabling it to generate electricity for up to 17.5 hours without direct solar radiation, which allows it to provide a stable electricity supply without interruptions if required. The Project secured up to 950 GW·h per year sale. Another project is the María Elena plant is a 400 MW thermo-solar complex in the northern Chilean region of Antofagasta employing molten salt technology.

== Electricity production ==
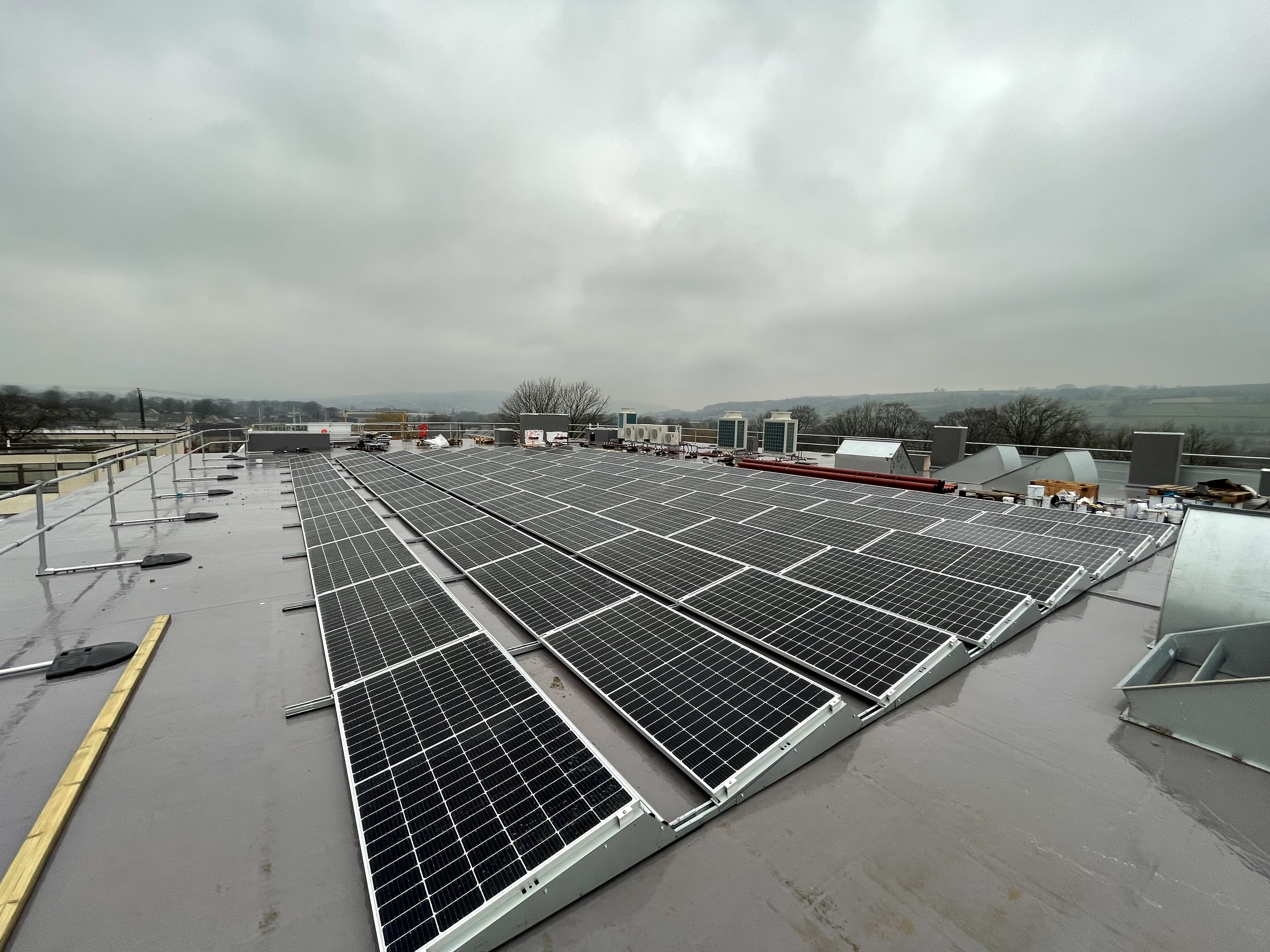
Greencap Energy solar array on NHS hospital in Keighley, England

Solar power, also known as solar electricity, is the conversion of energy from sunlight into electricity, either directly using photovoltaics (PV) or indirectly using concentrated solar power. Solar panels use the photovoltaic effect to convert light into an electric current. Concentrated solar power systems use lenses or mirrors and solar tracking systems to focus a large area of sunlight to a hot spot, often to drive a steam turbine.

Photovoltaics (PV) were initially solely used as a source of electricity for small and medium-sized applications, from the calculator powered by a single solar cell to remote homes powered by an off-grid rooftop PV system. Commercial concentrated solar power plants were first developed in the 1980s. Since then, as the cost of solar panels has fallen, grid-connected solar PV systems' capacity and production have doubled about every three years. Three-quarters of new generation capacity is solar, with both millions of rooftop installations and gigawatt-scale photovoltaic power stations continuing to be built.

In 2025, solar power generated 9% of global electricity. In 2024, solar generated 7% of global electricity and over 1% of primary energy (2.7% by the substitution method), adding twice as much new electricity as coal. Along with onshore wind power, utility-scale solar is the source with the cheapest levelised cost of electricity for new installations in most countries. Almost half the solar power installed in 2022 was mounted on rooftops. China is currently the largest producer and installer of solar power capacity; globally, it produces 98% of solar wafers, 92% of solar cells and 85% of solar panels, and accounted for more than 55% of global installed solar capacity in the first half of 2025.

Much more low-carbon power is needed for electrification and to limit climate change. The International Energy Agency said in 2022 that more effort was needed for grid integration and the mitigation of policy, regulation and financing challenges. Nevertheless solar may greatly cut the cost of energy. Solar is important for energy security.

== Concentrated solar power ==
Concentrating Solar Power (CSP) systems use lenses or mirrors and tracking systems to focus a large area of sunlight into a small beam. The concentrated heat is then used as a heat source for a conventional power plant. A wide range of concentrating technologies exists; the most developed are the parabolic trough, the solar tower collectors, the concentrating linear Fresnel reflector, and the Stirling dish. Various techniques are used to track the Sun and focus light. In all of these systems, a working fluid is heated by the concentrated sunlight, and is then used for power generation or energy storage. Designs need to account for the risk of a dust storm, hail, or another extreme weather event that can damage the fine glass surfaces of solar power plants. Metal grills would allow a high percentage of sunlight to enter the mirrors and solar panels while also preventing most damage.

== Architecture and urban planning ==
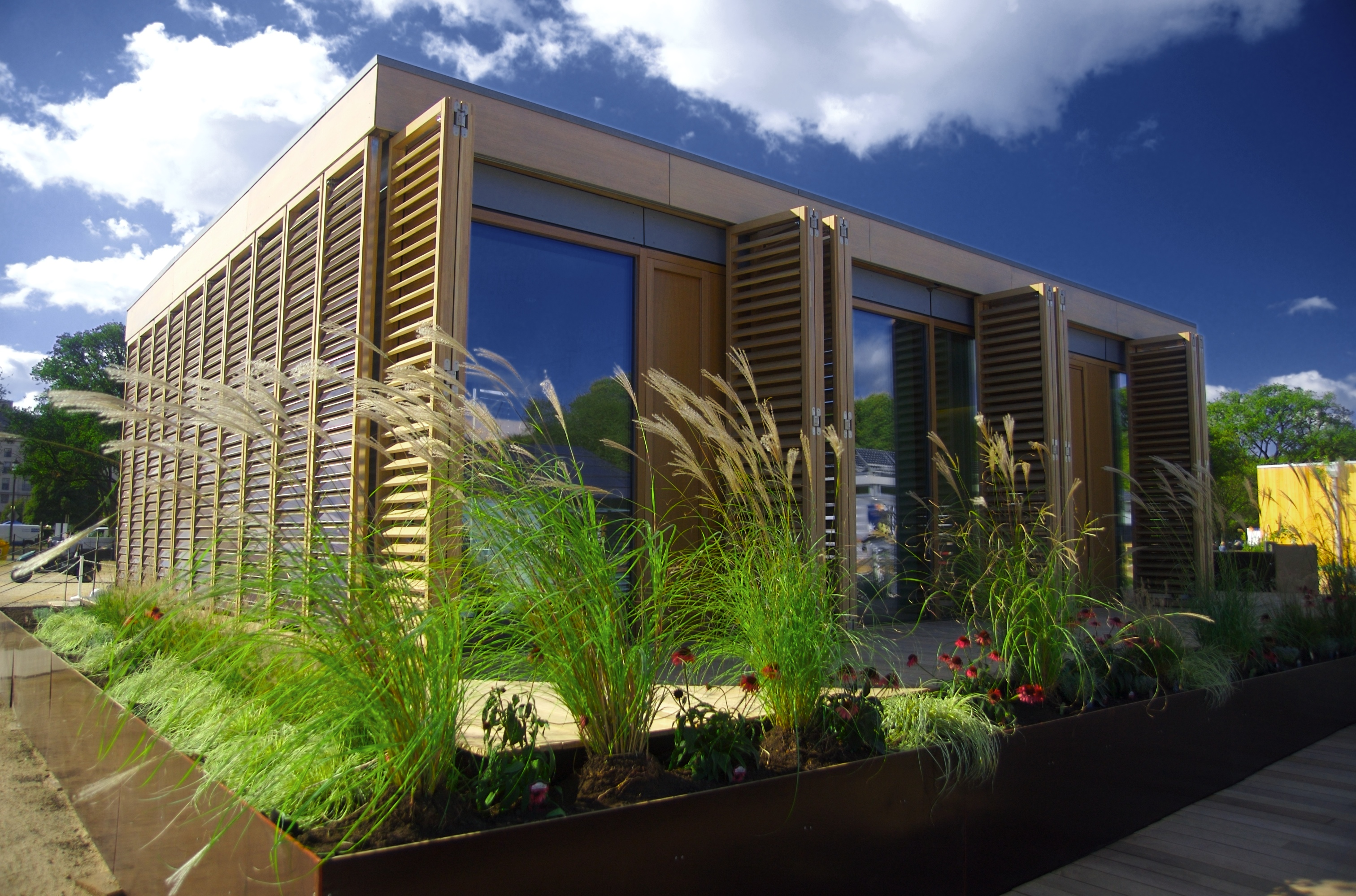
Darmstadt University of Technology, Germany, won the 2007 Solar Decathlon in Washington, DC with this passive house designed for humid and hot subtropical climate.

Sunlight has influenced building design since the beginning of architectural history. Advanced solar architecture and urban planning methods were first employed by the Greeks and Chinese, who oriented their buildings toward the south to provide light and warmth.

The common features of passive solar architecture are orientation relative to the Sun, compact proportion (a low surface area to volume ratio), selective shading (overhangs) and thermal mass. When these features are tailored to the local climate and environment, they can produce well-lit spaces that stay in a comfortable temperature range. Socrates' Megaron House is a classic example of passive solar design. The most recent approaches to solar design use computer modeling tying together solar lighting, heating and ventilation systems in an integrated solar design package. Active solar equipment such as pumps, fans, and switchable windows can complement passive design and improve system performance.

Urban heat islands (UHI) are metropolitan areas with higher temperatures than that of the surrounding environment. The higher temperatures result from increased absorption of solar energy by urban materials such as asphalt and concrete, which have lower albedos and higher heat capacities than those in the natural environment. A straightforward method of counteracting the UHI effect is to paint buildings and roads white and to plant trees in the area. Using these methods, a hypothetical "cool communities" program in Los Angeles has projected that urban temperatures could be reduced by approximately 3 °C at an estimated cost of US$1 billion, giving estimated total annual benefits of US$530 million from reduced air-conditioning costs and healthcare savings.

== Agriculture and horticulture ==
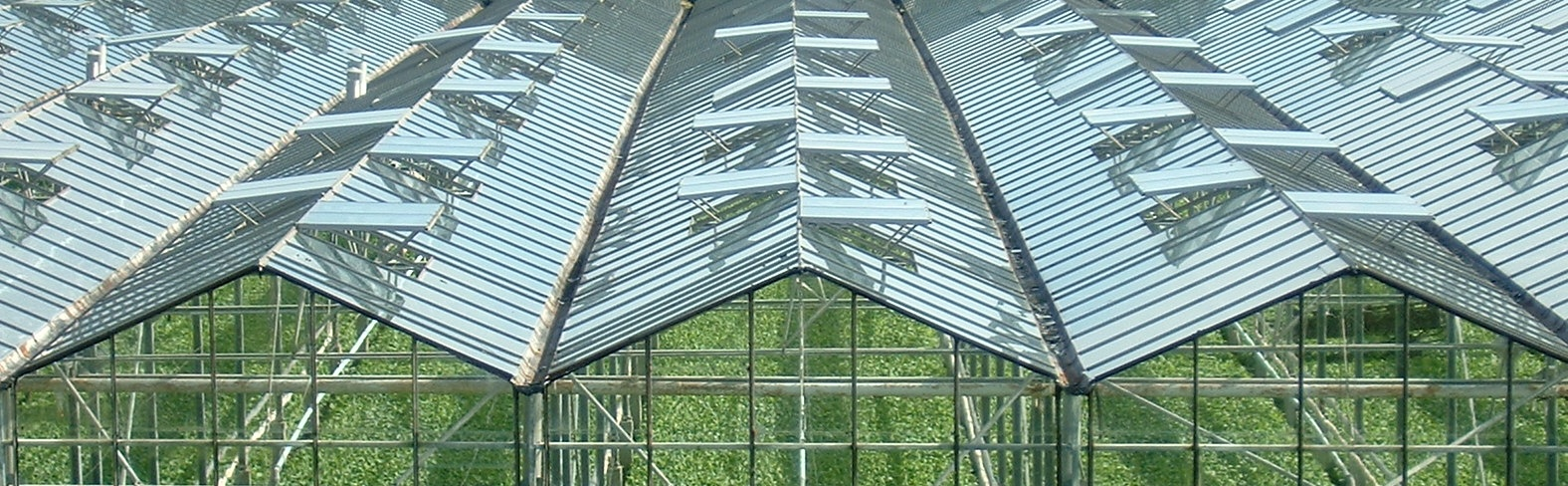
Greenhouses like these in the Westland municipality of the Netherlands grow vegetables, fruits and flowers.

Agriculture and horticulture seek to optimize the capture of solar energy to optimize the productivity of plants. Techniques such as timed planting cycles, tailored row orientation, staggered heights between rows and the mixing of plant varieties can improve crop yields. While sunlight is generally considered a plentiful resource, the exceptions highlight the importance of solar energy to agriculture. During the short growing seasons of the Little Ice Age, French and English farmers employed fruit walls to maximize the collection of solar energy. These walls acted as thermal masses and accelerated ripening by keeping plants warm. Early fruit walls were built perpendicular to the ground and facing south, but over time, sloping walls were developed to make better use of sunlight. In 1699, Nicolas Fatio de Duillier even suggested using a tracking mechanism which could pivot to follow the Sun. Applications of solar energy in agriculture aside from growing crops include pumping water, drying crops, brooding chicks and drying chicken manure. More recently the technology has been embraced by vintners, who use the energy generated by solar panels to power grape presses.

Greenhouses convert solar light to heat, enabling year-round production and the growth (in enclosed environments) of specialty crops and other plants not naturally suited to the local climate. Primitive greenhouses were first used during Roman times to produce cucumbers year-round for the Roman emperor Tiberius. The first modern greenhouses were built in Europe in the 16th century to keep exotic plants brought back from explorations abroad. Greenhouses remain an important part of horticulture today. Plastic transparent materials have also been used to similar effect in polytunnels and row covers.

== Transport ==
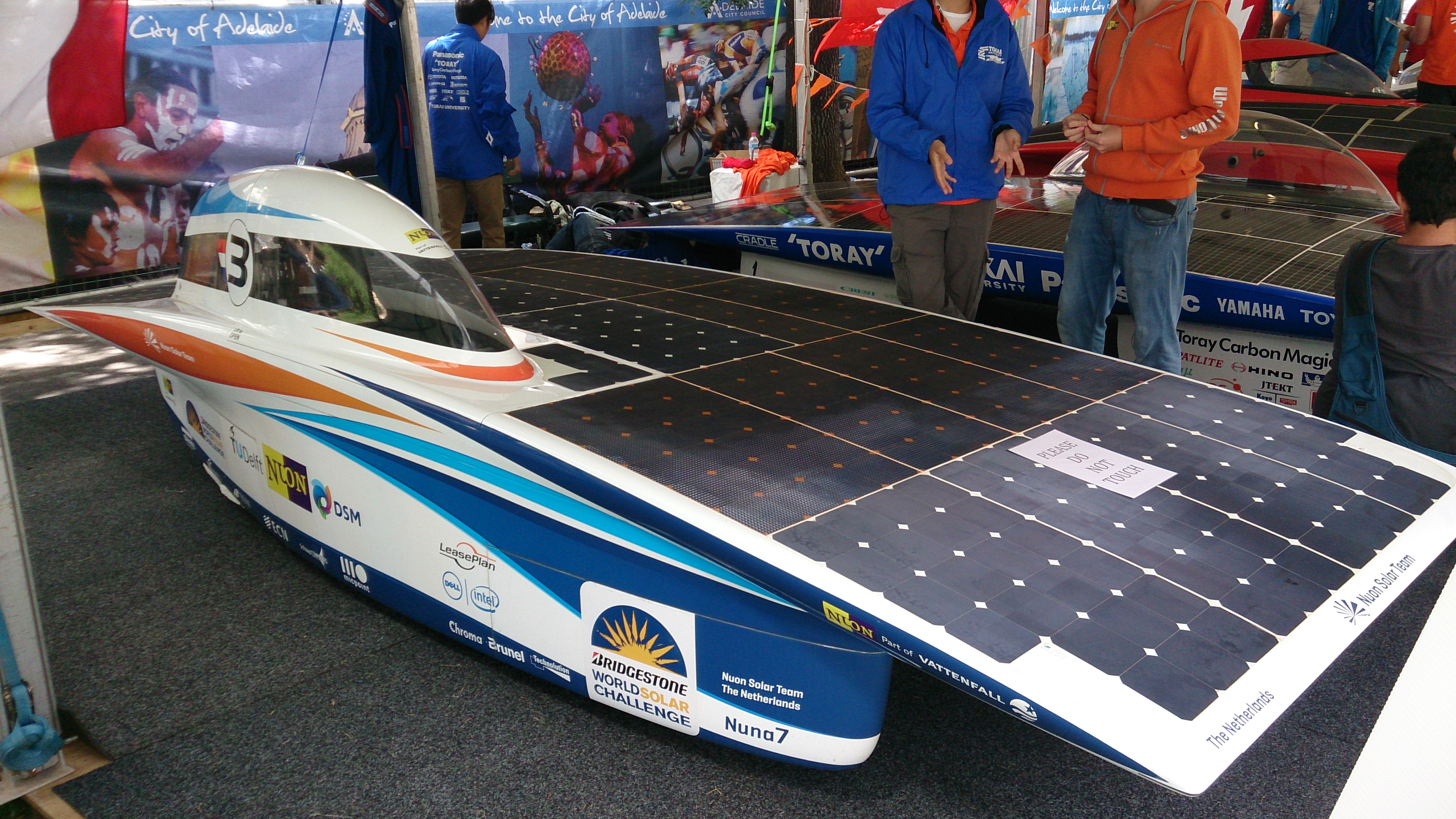
Winner of the 2013 World Solar Challenge in Australia

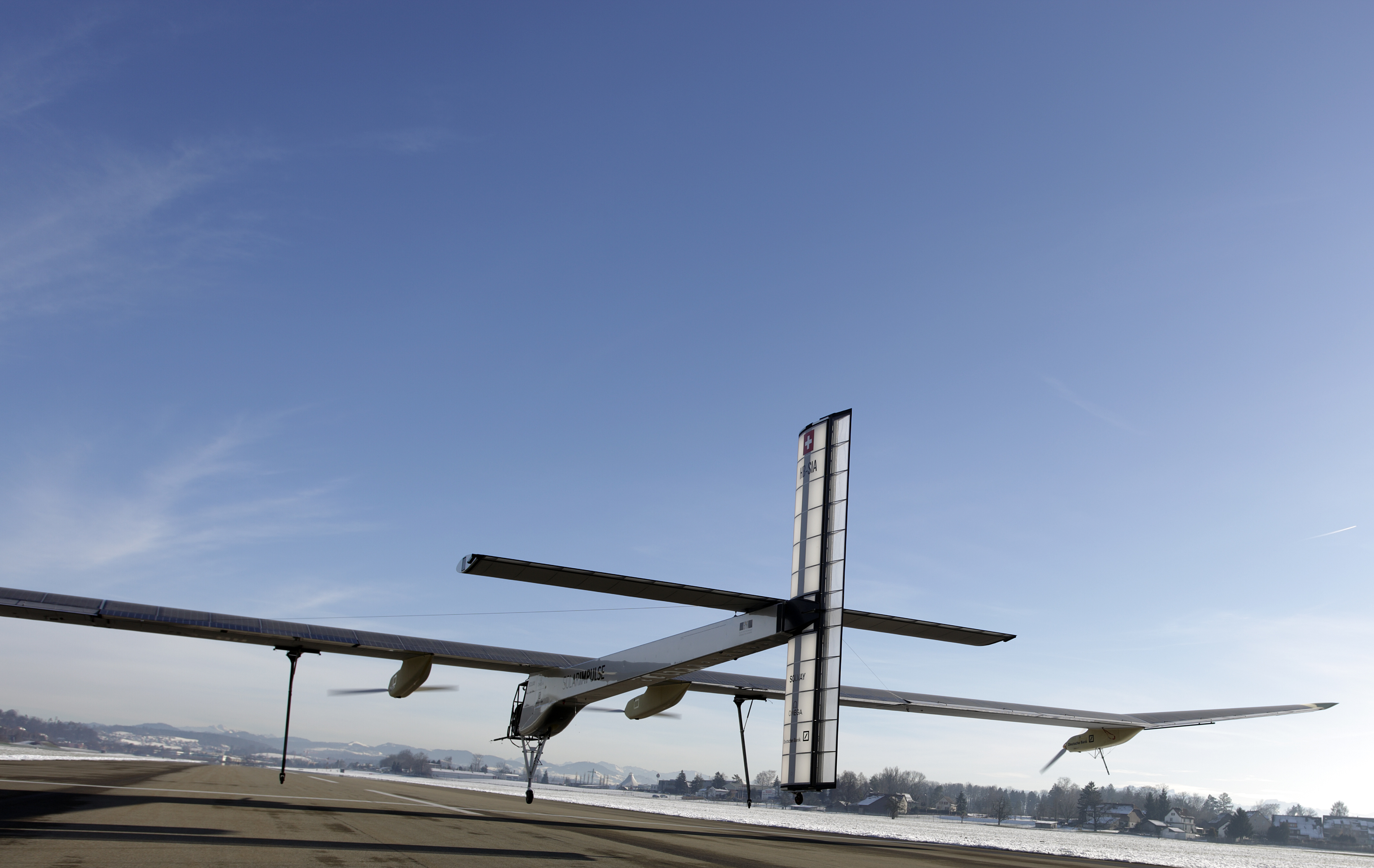
Solar electric aircraft circumnavigating the globe in 2015

Development of a solar-powered car has been an engineering goal since the 1980s. The World Solar Challenge is a biannual solar-powered car race, where teams from universities and enterprises compete over 3,021 kilometres (1,877 mi) across central Australia from Darwin to Adelaide. In 1987, when it was founded, the winner's average speed was 67 kilometres per hour (42 mph) and by 2007 the winner's average speed had improved to 90.87 kilometres per hour (56.46 mph). The North American Solar Challenge and the planned South African Solar Challenge are comparable competitions that reflect an international interest in the engineering and development of solar powered vehicles.

Some vehicles use solar panels for auxiliary power, such as for air conditioning, to keep the interior cool, thus reducing fuel consumption.

In 1975, the first practical solar boat was constructed in England. By 1995, passenger boats incorporating PV panels began appearing and are now used extensively. In 1996, Kenichi Horie made the first solar-powered crossing of the Pacific Ocean, and the Sun21 catamaran made the first solar-powered crossing of the Atlantic Ocean in the winter of 2006–2007. There were plans to circumnavigate the globe in 2010.

In 1974, the unmanned AstroFlight Sunrise airplane made the first solar flight. On 29 April 1979, the Solar Riser made the first flight in a solar-powered, fully controlled, man-carrying flying machine, reaching an altitude of 40 ft (12 m). In 1980, the Gossamer Penguin made the first piloted flights powered solely by photovoltaics. This was quickly followed by the Solar Challenger which crossed the English Channel in July 1981. In 1990 Eric Scott Raymond in 21 hops flew from California to North Carolina using solar power. Developments then turned back to unmanned aerial vehicles (UAV) with the Pathfinder (1997) and subsequent designs, culminating in the Helios which set the altitude record for a non-rocket-propelled aircraft at 29,524 metres (96,864 ft) in 2001. The Zephyr, developed by BAE Systems, is the latest in a line of record-breaking solar aircraft, making a 54-hour flight in 2007, and month-long flights were envisioned by 2010. From March 2015 to July 2016, Solar Impulse, an electric aircraft, successfully circumnavigated the globe. It is a single-seat plane powered by solar cells and capable of taking off under its own power. The design allows the aircraft to remain airborne for several days.

A solar balloon is a black balloon that is filled with ordinary air. As sunlight shines on the balloon, the air inside is heated and expands, causing an upward buoyancy force, much like an artificially heated hot air balloon. Some solar balloons are large enough for human flight, but usage is generally limited to the toy market as the surface-area to payload-weight ratio is relatively high.

=== Squad Solar vehicle ===
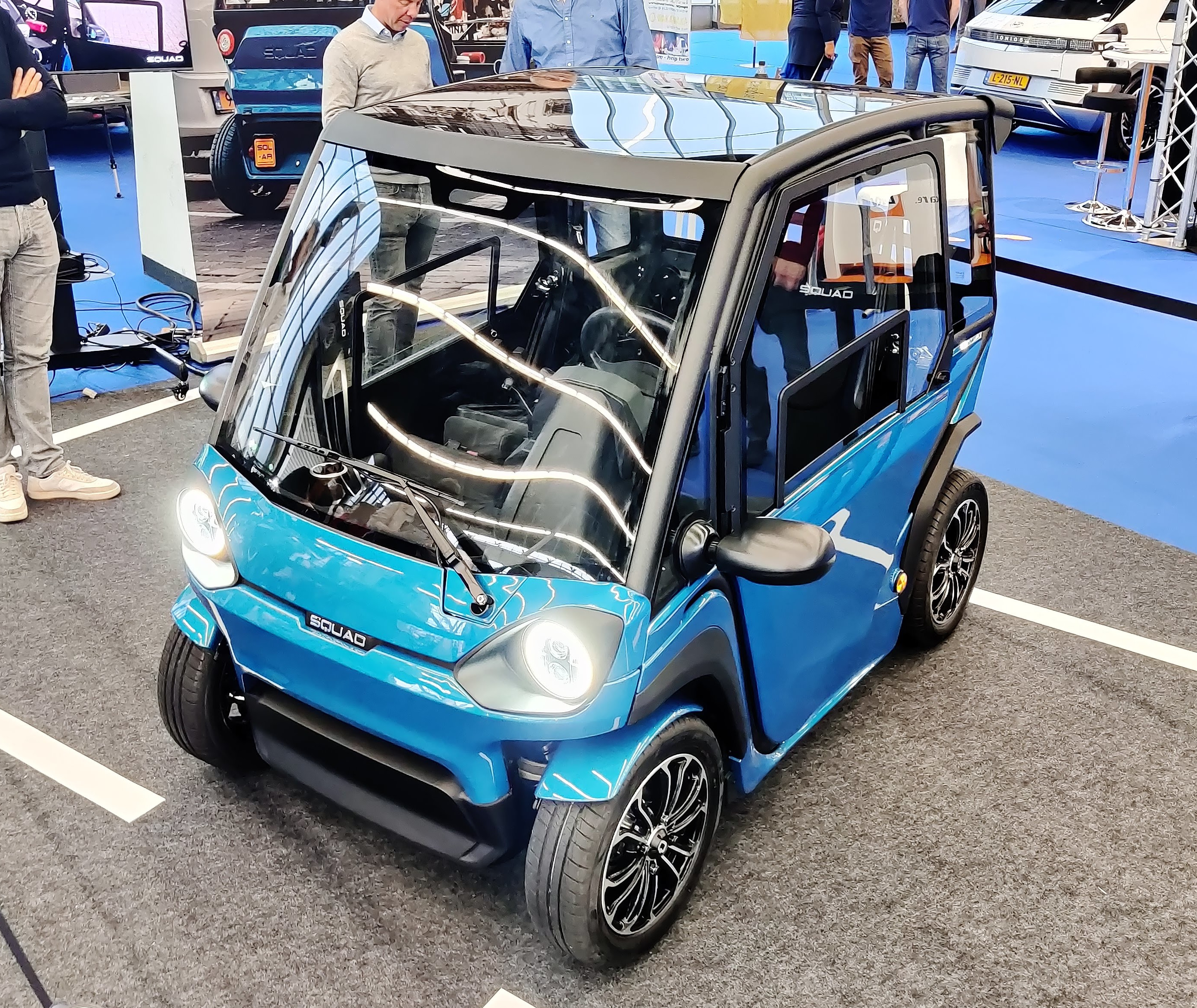
Squad Solar

The Squad Solar is a Neighborhood Electric Vehicle that has a solar roof and can be plugged into a normal 120 volt outlet to be charged.

== Fuel production ==
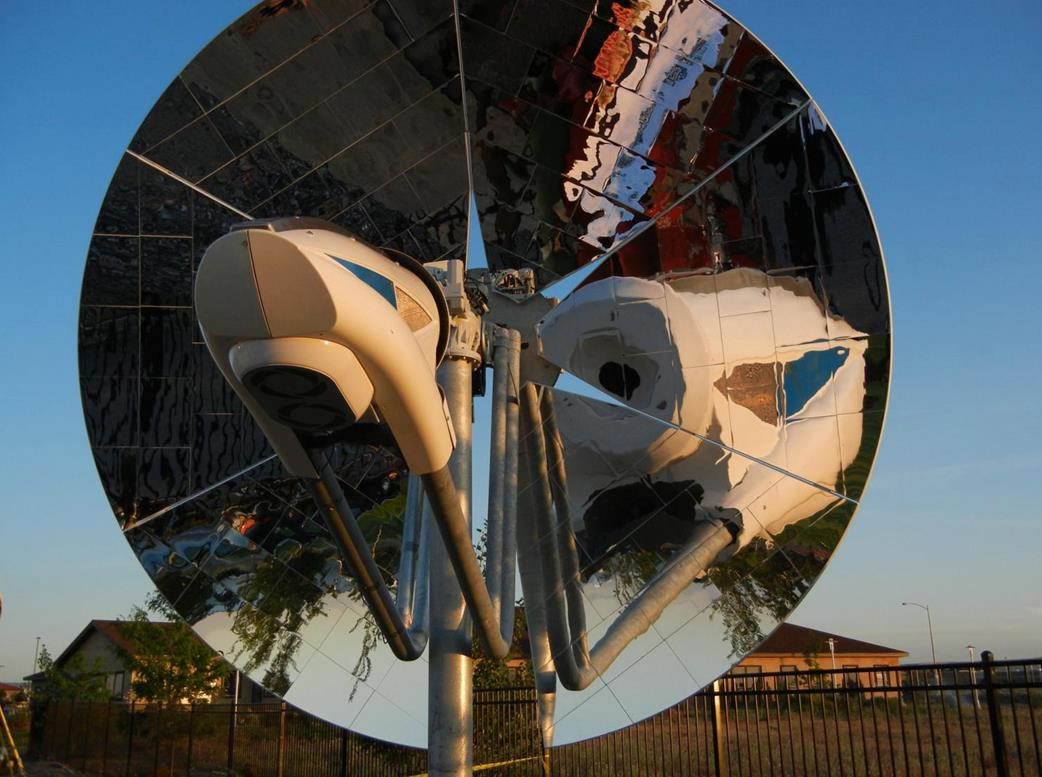
Concentrated solar panels are getting a power boost. Pacific Northwest National Laboratory (PNNL) will be testing a new concentrated solar power system – one that can help natural gas power plants reduce their fuel usage by up to 20 percent.

Solar chemical processes use solar energy to drive chemical reactions. These processes offset energy that would otherwise come from a fossil fuel source and can also convert solar energy into storable and transportable fuels. Solar induced chemical reactions can be divided into thermochemical or photochemical. A variety of fuels can be produced by artificial photosynthesis. The multielectron catalytic chemistry involved in making carbon-based fuels (such as methanol) from reduction of carbon dioxide is challenging; a feasible alternative is hydrogen production from protons, though use of water as the source of electrons (as plants do) requires mastering the multielectron oxidation of two water molecules to molecular oxygen. Some have envisaged working solar fuel plants in coastal metropolitan areas by 2050 – the splitting of seawater providing hydrogen to be run through adjacent fuel-cell electric power plants and the pure water by-product going directly into the municipal water system. In addition, chemical energy storage is another solution to solar energy storage.

Hydrogen production technologies have been a significant area of solar chemical research since the 1970s. Aside from electrolysis driven by photovoltaic or photochemical cells, several thermochemical processes have also been explored. One such route uses concentrators to split water into oxygen and hydrogen at high temperatures (2,300–2,600 °C or 4,200–4,700 °F). Another approach uses the heat from solar concentrators to drive the steam reformation of natural gas thereby increasing the overall hydrogen yield compared to conventional reforming methods. Thermochemical cycles characterized by the decomposition and regeneration of reactants present another avenue for hydrogen production. The Solzinc process under development at the Weizmann Institute of Science uses a 1 MW solar furnace to decompose zinc oxide (ZnO) at temperatures above 1,200 °C (2,200 °F). This initial reaction produces pure zinc, which can subsequently be reacted with water to produce hydrogen.

== Energy storage methods ==
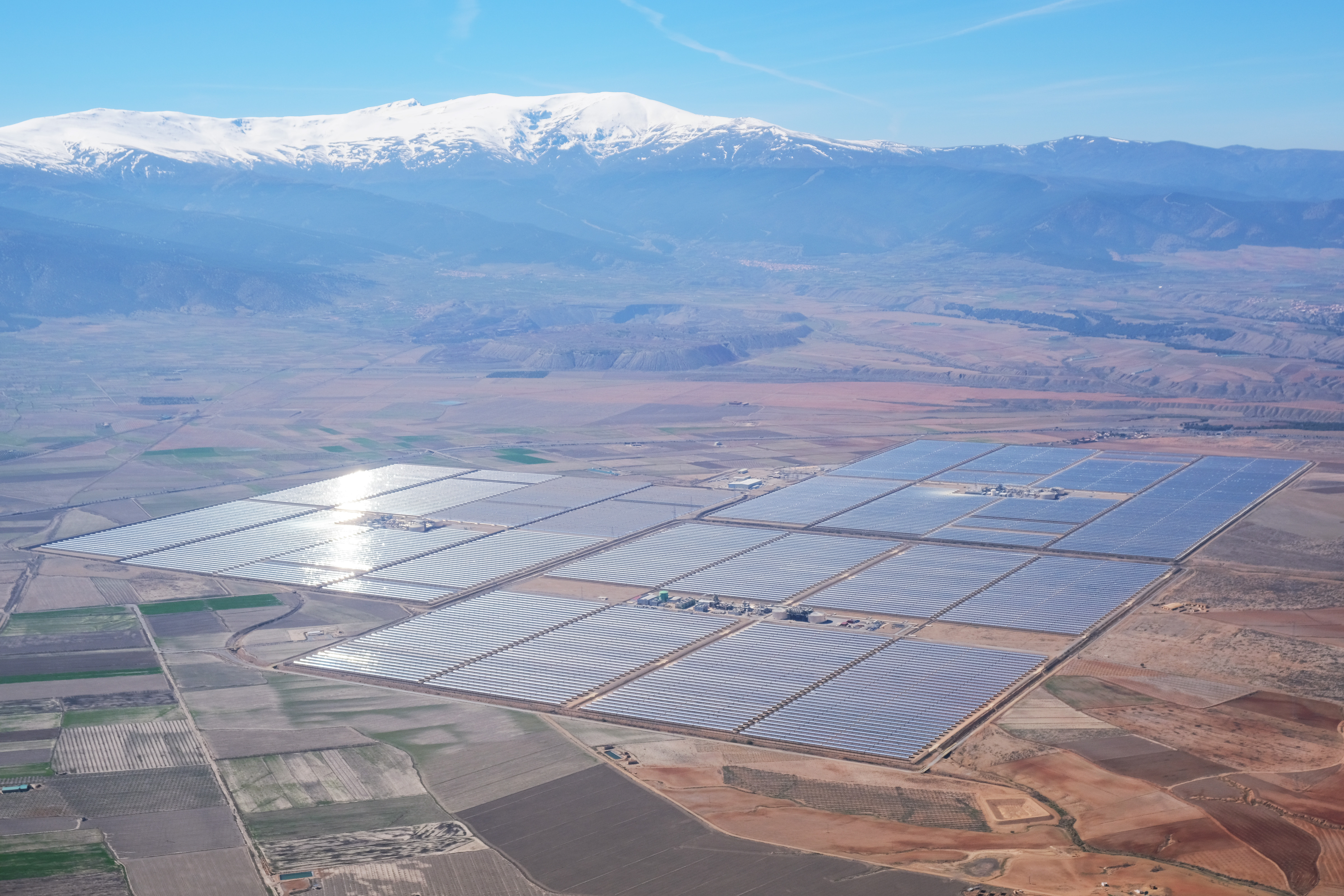
Thermal energy storage. The Andasol CSP plant uses tanks of molten salt to store solar energy.

Thermal mass systems can store solar energy in the form of heat at domestically useful temperatures for daily or interseasonal durations. Thermal storage systems generally use readily available materials with high specific heat capacities such as water, earth and stone. Well-designed systems can lower peak demand, shift time-of-use to off-peak hours and reduce overall heating and cooling requirements.

Phase change materials such as paraffin wax and Glauber's salt are another thermal storage medium. These materials are inexpensive, readily available, and can deliver domestically useful temperatures (approximately 64 °C or 147 °F). The "Dover House" (in Dover, Massachusetts) was the first to use a Glauber's salt heating system, in 1948. Solar energy can also be stored at high temperatures using molten salts. Salts are an effective storage medium because they are low-cost, have a high specific heat capacity, and can deliver heat at temperatures compatible with conventional power systems. The Solar Two project used this method of energy storage, allowing it to store 1.44 terajoules (400,000 kWh) in its 68 m^{3} storage tank with an annual storage efficiency of about 99%.

Off-grid PV systems have traditionally used rechargeable batteries to store excess electricity. With grid-tied systems, excess electricity can be sent to the transmission grid, while standard grid electricity can be used to meet shortfalls. Net metering programs give household systems credit for any electricity they deliver to the grid. This is handled by 'rolling back' the meter whenever the home produces more electricity than it consumes. If the net electricity use is below zero, the utility then rolls over the kilowatt-hour credit to the next month. Other approaches involve the use of two meters, to measure electricity consumed vs. electricity produced. This is less common due to the increased installation cost of the second meter. Most standard meters accurately measure in both directions, making a second meter unnecessary.

Pumped-storage hydroelectricity stores energy in the form of water pumped when energy is available from a lower elevation reservoir to a higher elevation one. The energy is recovered when demand is high by releasing the water, with the pump becoming a hydroelectric power generator.

== Development, deployment and economics ==
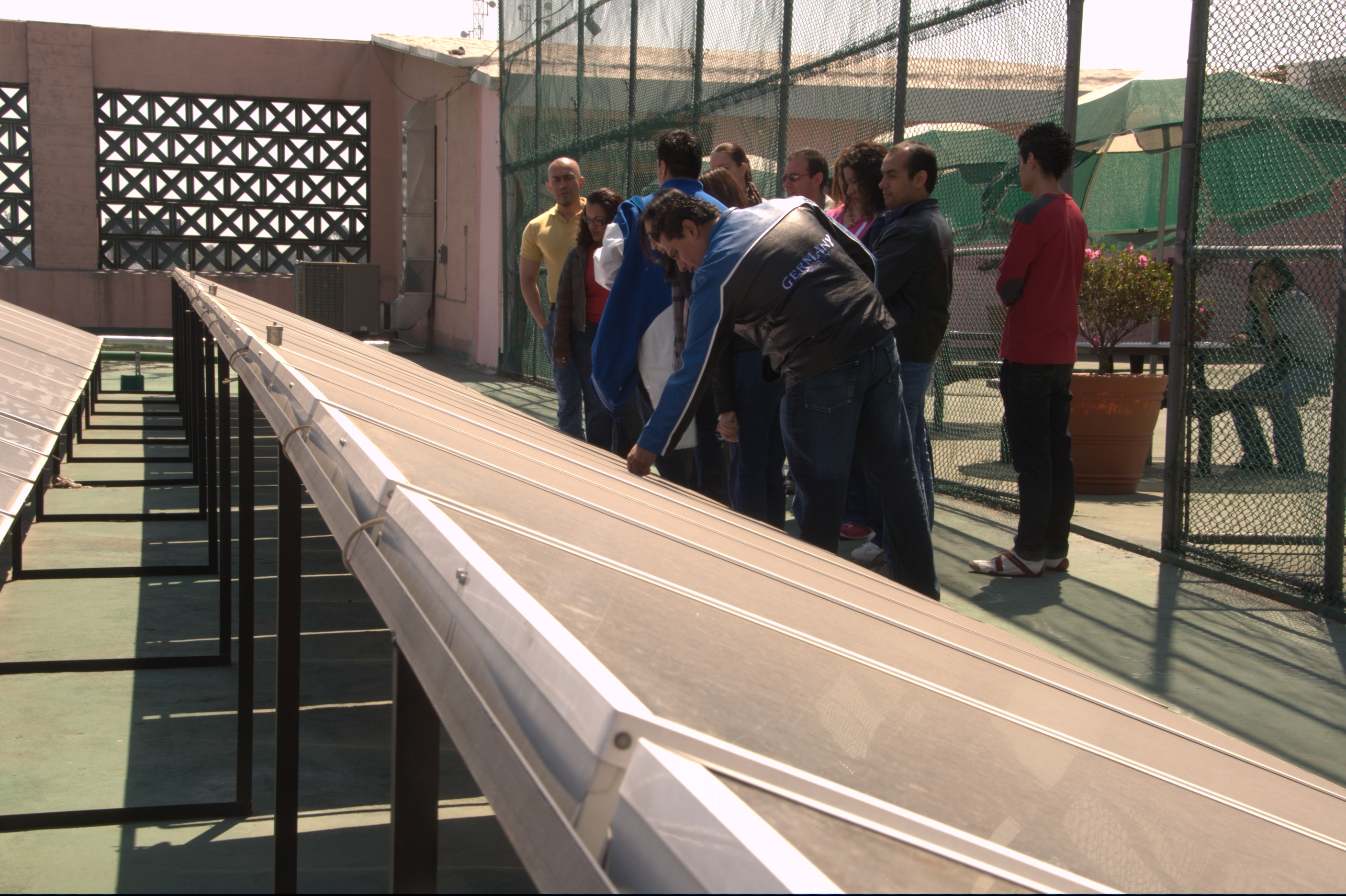
Participants in a workshop on sustainable development inspect solar panels at Monterrey Institute of Technology and Higher Education, Mexico City on top of a building on campus.

Cost development of solar PV modules per watt

Beginning with the surge in coal use, which accompanied the Industrial Revolution, energy consumption steadily transitioned from wood and biomass to fossil fuels. The early development of solar technologies starting in the 1860s was driven by an expectation that coal would soon become scarce. However, development of solar technologies stagnated in the early 20th century in the face of the increasing availability, economy, and utility of coal and petroleum.

Commercial solar water heaters began appearing in the United States in the 1890s. These systems saw increasing use until the 1920s but were gradually replaced by cheaper and more reliable heating fuels. As with photovoltaics, solar water heating attracted renewed attention as a result of the 1973 oil embargo and 1979 energy crisis, but interest subsided in the 1980s due to falling petroleum prices. Development in the solar water heating sector progressed steadily throughout the 1990s, and annual growth rates have averaged 20% since 1999. Although generally underestimated, solar water heating and cooling is by far the most widely deployed solar technology with an estimated capacity of 154 GW as of 2007.

The 1970s oil crises caused a reorganization of energy policies around the world. It brought renewed attention to developing solar technologies. Deployment strategies focused on incentive programs such as the Federal Photovoltaic Utilization Program in the US and the Sunshine Program in Japan. Other efforts included the formation of research facilities in the US (SERI, now NREL), Japan (NEDO), and Germany (Fraunhofer Institute for Solar Energy Systems ISE), and Australia. In 1981, a team from Australian National University constructed the White Cliffs Solar Power Station in New South Wales, which became the basic model on which all future solar technology has been based, and may arguably considered the world's first commercial solar power station.

In 2011, a report by the International Energy Agency (IEA) found that solar energy technologies such as photovoltaics, solar hot water, and concentrated solar power could provide a third of the world's energy by 2060 if politicians commit to limiting climate change and transitioning to renewable energy. The energy from the Sun could play a key role in de-carbonizing the global economy alongside improvements in energy efficiency and imposing costs on greenhouse gas emitters. "The strength of solar is the incredible variety and flexibility of applications, from small scale to big scale". The IEA said in its report that solar energy could make considerable contributions to solving some of the most urgent problems the world now faces, including "[increasing] countries' energy security through reliance on an indigenous, inexhaustible, and mostly import-independent resource, enhance sustainability, reduce pollution, [lowering] the costs of mitigating climate change, and [keeping] fossil fuel prices lower than otherwise. These advantages are global."

In 2021 Lazard estimated the levelized cost of new build unsubsidized utility scale solar electricity at less than 37 dollars per MWh and existing coal-fired power above that amount. The 2021 report also said that new solar was also cheaper than new gas-fired power, but not generally existing gas power.

=== Emerging technologies ===
Solar cell efficiencies of various cell technologies (including both single-crystal and thin film technologies) as tracked by NREL

==== Experimental solar power ====
Concentrated photovoltaics (CPV) systems employ sunlight concentrated onto photovoltaic surfaces for the purpose of electricity generation. Thermoelectric, or "thermovoltaic" devices convert a temperature difference between dissimilar materials into an electric current.

==== Floating solar arrays ====
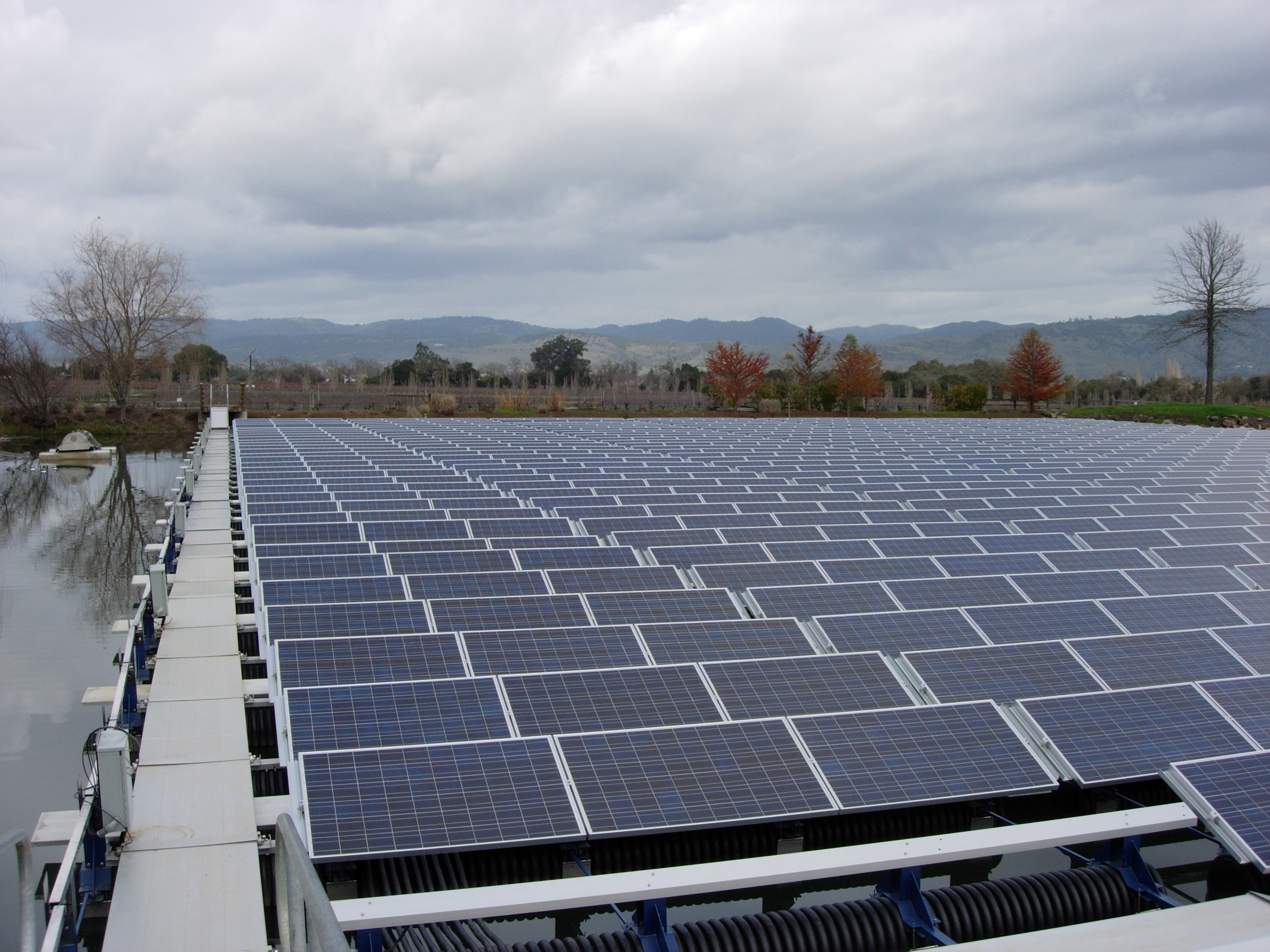
Floating photovoltaic on an irrigation pond

Floating solar or floating photovoltaics (FPV), sometimes called floatovoltaics, are solar panels mounted on a structure that floats. The structures that hold the panels usually consist of plastic buoys and cables. They are then placed on a body of water (e.g., Reservoirs, quarry lakes, irrigation canals or remediation and tailing ponds).

The systems can have advantages over photovoltaics (PV) on land. Water surfaces may be less expensive than the cost of land, and there are fewer rules and regulations for structures built on bodies of water not used for recreation. Life cycle analysis indicates that foam-based FPV have some of the shortest energy payback times (1.3 years) and the lowest greenhouse gas emissions to energy ratio (11 kg CO_{2} eq/MWh) in crystalline silicon solar photovoltaic technologies reported. FPV can be used to generate electricity for any application as well as to make green hydrogen via electrolysis on the same water they are floating on.

Floating arrays can achieve higher efficiencies than PV panels on land because water cools the panels. The panels can have a special coating to prevent rust or corrosion. Floating SPV also provide shade, slow evaporation and inhibit the growth of algae.

The market for this renewable energy technology has grown rapidly since 2016. The first 20 plants with capacities of a few dozen kWp were built between 2007 and 2013. Installed power grew from 3 GW in 2020, to 13 GW in 2022, surpassing a prediction of 10 GW by 2025. The World Bank estimated there are 6,600 large bodies of water suitable for floating solar, with a technical capacity of over 4,000 GW if 10% of their surfaces were covered with panels.

The US has more floating solar potential than any other country in the world. Bodies of water suitable for floating solar are well-distributed throughout the US The southeast and southern US plains states generally have reservoirs with the largest capacities.

==== Solar-assisted heat pump ====
A heat pump is a device that provides heat energy from a source of heat to a destination called a "heat sink". Heat pumps are designed to move thermal energy opposite to the direction of spontaneous heat flow by absorbing heat from a cold space and releasing it to a warmer one. A solar-assisted heat pump represents the integration of a heat pump and thermal solar panels in a single integrated system. Typically these two technologies are used separately (or only placing them in parallel) to produce hot water. In this system the solar thermal panel performs the function of the low temperature heat source and the heat produced is used to feed the heat pump's evaporator. The goal of this system is to get high COP and then produce energy in a more efficient and less expensive way.

It is possible to use any type of solar thermal panel (sheet and tubes, roll-bond, heat pipe, thermal plates) or hybrid (mono/polycrystalline, thin film) in combination with the heat pump. The use of a hybrid panel is preferable because it allows covering a part of the electricity demand of the heat pump and reduces the power consumption and consequently the variable costs of the system.

==== Solar aircraft ====
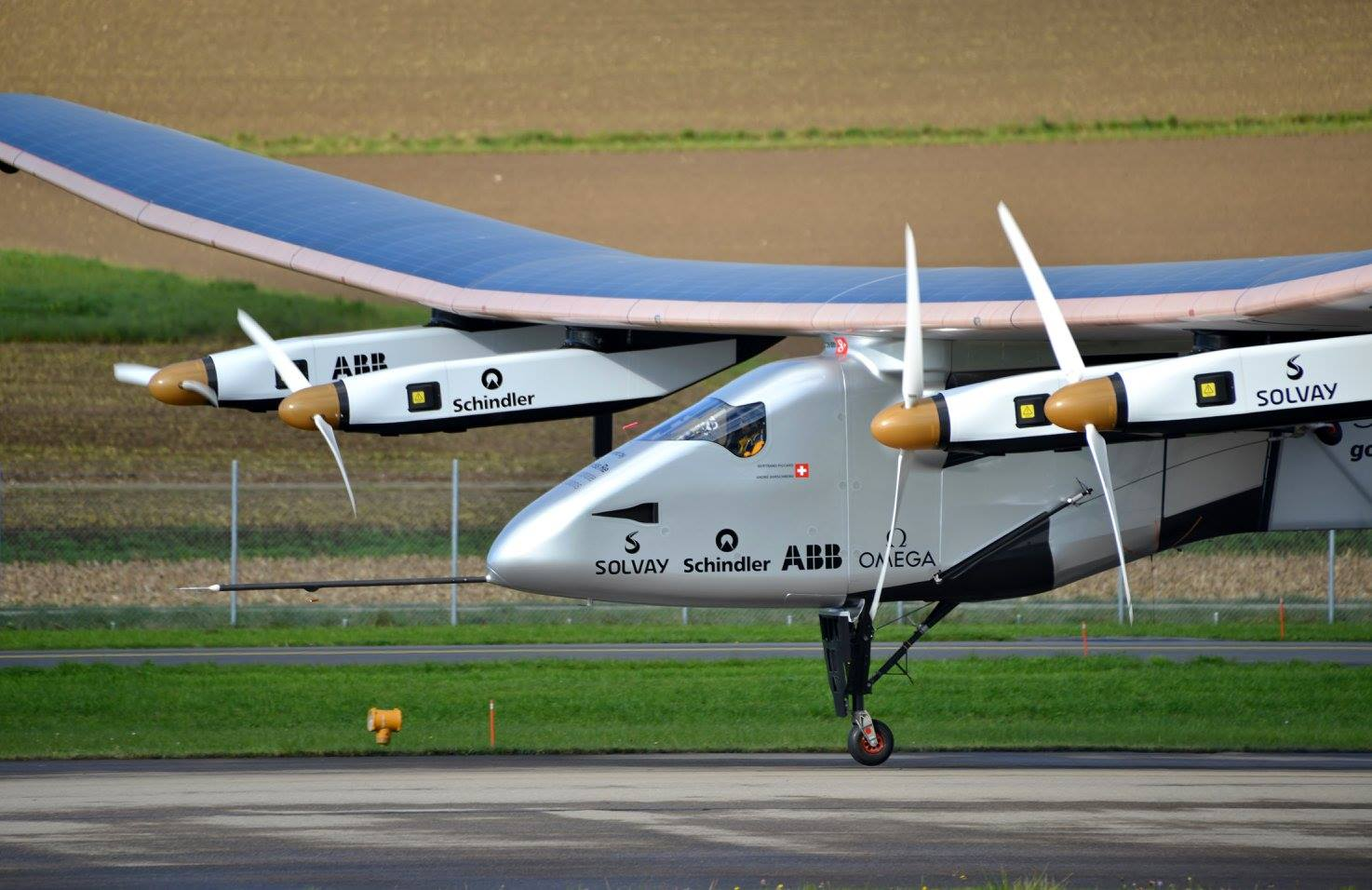
In 2016, Solar Impulse 2 was the first solar-powered aircraft to complete a circumnavigation of the world.

An electric aircraft is an aircraft that runs on electric motors rather than internal combustion engines, with electricity coming from fuel cells, solar cells, ultracapacitors, power beaming, or batteries.

Currently, flying manned electric aircraft are mostly experimental demonstrators, though many small unmanned aerial vehicles are powered by batteries. Electrically powered model aircraft have been flown since the 1970s, with one report in 1957. The first man-carrying electrically powered flights were made in 1973. Between 2015 and 2016, a manned, solar-powered plane, Solar Impulse 2, completed a circumnavigation of the Earth.

== See also ==
- Heliostat
- List of renewable energy journals
- List of solar energy topics
- List of solar-powered products
- Renewable heat
- Soil solarization
- Solar easement
- Solar energy use in rural Africa
- Solar updraft tower
- Solar power satellite
- Solar tracker
