= Les Côteaux, Haiti =

Les Côteaux Koto
- Commune
- Interactive map of Les Côteaux
- Location in Haiti
- Coordinates: 18°12′26″N 74°02′25″W
- Country: Haiti
- Department: Sud
- Arrondissement: Les Côteaux

Area
  - Total: 74.36 km^{2} (28.71 sq mi)
- Elevation: 16 m (52 ft)

Population (2015)
  - Total: 21,302
  - Density: 286.5/km^{2} (742.0/sq mi)
- Time zone: UTC−05:00 (EST)
  - Summer (DST): UTC−04:00 (EDT)
- Postal code: HT 8410

Les Côteaux (French pronunciation: [le koto]; Haitian Creole: Koto) is a commune in the Les Côteaux Arrondissement, in the Sud department of Haiti. In 2015, it had a population of 21,302 inhabitants.

== Settlements ==
- Les Côteaux
- Dépas
- Lan Beurte
