= Les Côteaux Arrondissement =

Coordinates: 18.2°N 74.0333°W

Les Côteaux Arrondissement Arrondissement des Côteaux Awondisman Koto
- Arrondissement
- Interactive map of Les Côteaux Arrondissement
- Country: Haiti
- Department: Sud

Area
  - Arrondissement: 181.18 km^{2} (69.95 sq mi)
  - Urban: 5.86 km^{2} (2.26 sq mi)
  - Rural: 175.32 km^{2} (67.69 sq mi)

Population (2015)
  - Arrondissement: 58,618
  - Density: 323.53/km^{2} (837.95/sq mi)
  - Urban: 18,832
  - Rural: 39,786
- Time zone: UTC-5 (Eastern)
- Postal code: HT84—
- Communes: 3
- Communal Sections: 8
- IHSI Code: 074

Les Côteaux (Haitian Creole: Koto) is an arrondissement in the Sud department of Haiti. As of 2015, the population was 58,618 inhabitants. Postal codes in the Les Côteaux Arrondissement start with the number 84.

The arrondissement consists of the following municipalities:

- Les Côteaux
- Port-à-Piment
- Roche-à-Bateaux
