= Bon Pas =

Bon Pas Bompa
- Village
- Location in Haiti
- Coordinates: 18°18′00″N 74°16′53″W
- Country: Haiti
- Department: Sud
- Arrondissement: Chardonnières
- Elevation: 10 m (33 ft)
- Time zone: UTC-05:00 (EST)
  - Summer (DST): UTC-04:00 (EDT)

Bon Pas (Creole: Bompa) is a village in the Tiburon commune of the Chardonnières Arrondissement, in the Sud department of Haiti.

== See also ==
- Carrefour Gros Chaudiere
- Conete
- Dalmate
- Galette Sèche
- Perion
- Plansinte
- Tiburon
