= Dernere Morne, Haiti =

Dernere Morne
- Village
- Location in Haiti
- Coordinates: 18.3230265°N 74.2087787°W
- Country: Haiti
- Department: Sud
- Arrondissement: Chardonnières
- Elevation: 45 m (148 ft)

Dernere Morne is a village in the Les Anglais commune of the Chardonnières Arrondissement, in the Sud department of Haiti.

== See also ==
- Boco
- Chanterelle
- Les Anglais (town)
- Limo
