= Limo, Haiti =

Limo
- Village
- Location in Haiti
- Coordinates: 18.330677°N 74.198809°W
- Country: Haiti
- Department: Sud
- Arrondissement: Chardonnières
- Elevation: 59 m (194 ft)

Limo is a village in the Les Anglais commune of the Chardonnières Arrondissement, in the Sud department of Haiti.

== See also ==
- Boco
- Chanterelle
- Dernere Morne
- Les Anglais (town)
