= Carrefour Gros Chaudiere =

- Village
- Location in Haiti
- Coordinates: 18.2928156°N 74.3438011°W
- Country: Haiti
- Department: Sud
- Arrondissement: Chardonnières
- Elevation: 9 m (30 ft)

Carrefour Gros Chaudiere is a village in the Tiburon commune of the Chardonnières Arrondissement, in the Sud department of Haiti.

== See also ==
- Bon Pas
- Conete
- Dalmate
- Galette Sèche
- Perion
- Plansinte
- Tiburon
