= Galette Sèche =

- Rural settlement
- Location in Haiti
- Coordinates: 18.3833121°N 74.283333°W
- Country: Haiti
- Department: Sud
- Arrondissement: Chardonnières
- Elevation: 450 m (1,480 ft)

Galette Sèche (French pronunciation: [ɡalɛt sɛʃ]) is a rural settlement in the Tiburon commune of the Chardonnières Arrondissement, in the Sud department of Haiti.

== See also ==
- Bon Pas
- Carrefour Gros Chaudiere
- Conete
- Dalmate
- Perion
- Plansinte
- Tiburon
