= Duplantin =

- Village
- Location in Haiti
- Coordinates: 18.3470536°N 74.0737027°W
- Country: Haiti
- Department: Sud
- Arrondissement: Chardonnières
- Elevation: 871 m (2,858 ft)

Duplantin (French pronunciation: [dyplɑ̃tɛ̃]) is a village in the Chardonnières commune of the Chardonnières Arrondissement, in the Sud department of Haiti.
