= Bousquel =

- Rural settlement
- Location in Haiti
- Coordinates: 18.2680297°N 74.1334676°W
- Country: Haiti
- Department: Sud
- Arrondissement: Chardonnières
- Elevation: 13 m (43 ft)

Bousquel is a rural settlement in the Chardonnières commune in the Chardonnières Arrondissement, in the Sud department of Haiti.
