= Perion, Haiti =

Perion
- Village
- Location in Haiti
- Coordinates: 18.3143693°N 74.3545863°W
- Country: Haiti
- Department: Sud
- Arrondissement: Chardonnières
- Elevation: 54 m (177 ft)

Perion is a village in the Tiburon commune of the Chardonnières Arrondissement, in the Sud department of Haiti.

== See also ==
- Bon Pas
- Carrefour Gros Chaudiere
- Conete
- Dalmate
- Galette Sèche
- Plansinte
- Tiburon
