= Bois Delai =

- Village
- Location in Haiti
- Coordinates: 18.3502893°N 74.1168594°W
- Country: Haiti
- Department: Sud
- Arrondissement: Chardonnières
- Elevation: 392 m (1,286 ft)

Bois Delai is a village in the Chardonnières commune of the Chardonnières Arrondissement, in the Sud department of Haiti.
