= Plansinte =

- Village
- Location in Haiti
- Coordinates: 18.3492761°N 74.4381022°W
- Country: Haiti
- Department: Sud
- Arrondissement: Chardonnières
- Elevation: 29 m (95 ft)

Plansinte is a village in the Tiburon commune of the Chardonnières Arrondissement, in the Sud department of Haiti.

== See also ==
- Bon Pas
- Carrefour Gros Chaudiere
- Conete
- Dalmate
- Galette Sèche
- Perion
- Tiburon
