= Boco, Haiti =

Boco
- Rural settlement
- Location in Haiti
- Coordinates: 18.3158257°N 74.1671563°W
- Country: Haiti
- Department: Sud
- Arrondissement: Chardonnières
- Elevation: 393 m (1,289 ft)

Boco is a rural settlement in the Les Anglais commune in the Chardonnières Arrondissement, in the Sud department of Haiti.

== See also ==
- Chanterelle
- Dernere Morne
- Les Anglais (town)
- Limo
