= Conete, Haiti =

Conete
- Village
- Location in Haiti
- Coordinates: 18.3199686°N 74.329859°W
- Country: Haiti
- Department: Sud
- Arrondissement: Chardonnières
- Elevation: 339 m (1,112 ft)

Conete is a village in the Tiburon commune in the Chardonnières Arrondissement, in the Sud department of Haiti.

== See also ==
- Bon Pas
- Carrefour Gros Chaudiere
- Dalmate
- Galette Sèche
- Perion
- Plansinte
- Tiburon
