= Chanterelle, Haiti =

Chanterelle
- Commune
- Location in Haiti
- Coordinates: 18.3499355°N 74.1877207°W
- Country: Haiti
- Department: Sud
- Arrondissement: Chardonnières
- Elevation: 401 m (1,316 ft)

Chanterelle is a rural settlement in the Les Anglais commune of the Chardonnières Arrondissement, in the Sud department of Haiti.

== See also ==
- Boco
- Dernere Morne
- Les Anglais (town)
- Limo
