= Dalmate, Haiti =

Dalmate
- Rural settlement
- Location in Haiti
- Coordinates: 18.3165896°N 74.372219°W
- Country: Haiti
- Department: Sud
- Arrondissement: Chardonnières
- Elevation: 163 m (535 ft)

Dalmate is a rural settlement in the Tiburon commune of the Chardonnières Arrondissement, in the Sud department of Haiti.

== See also ==
- Bon Pas
- Carrefour Gros Chaudiere
- Conete
- Galette Sèche
- Perion
- Plansinte
- Tiburon
