= Effects of Hurricane Matthew in Haiti =

Hurricane Matthew
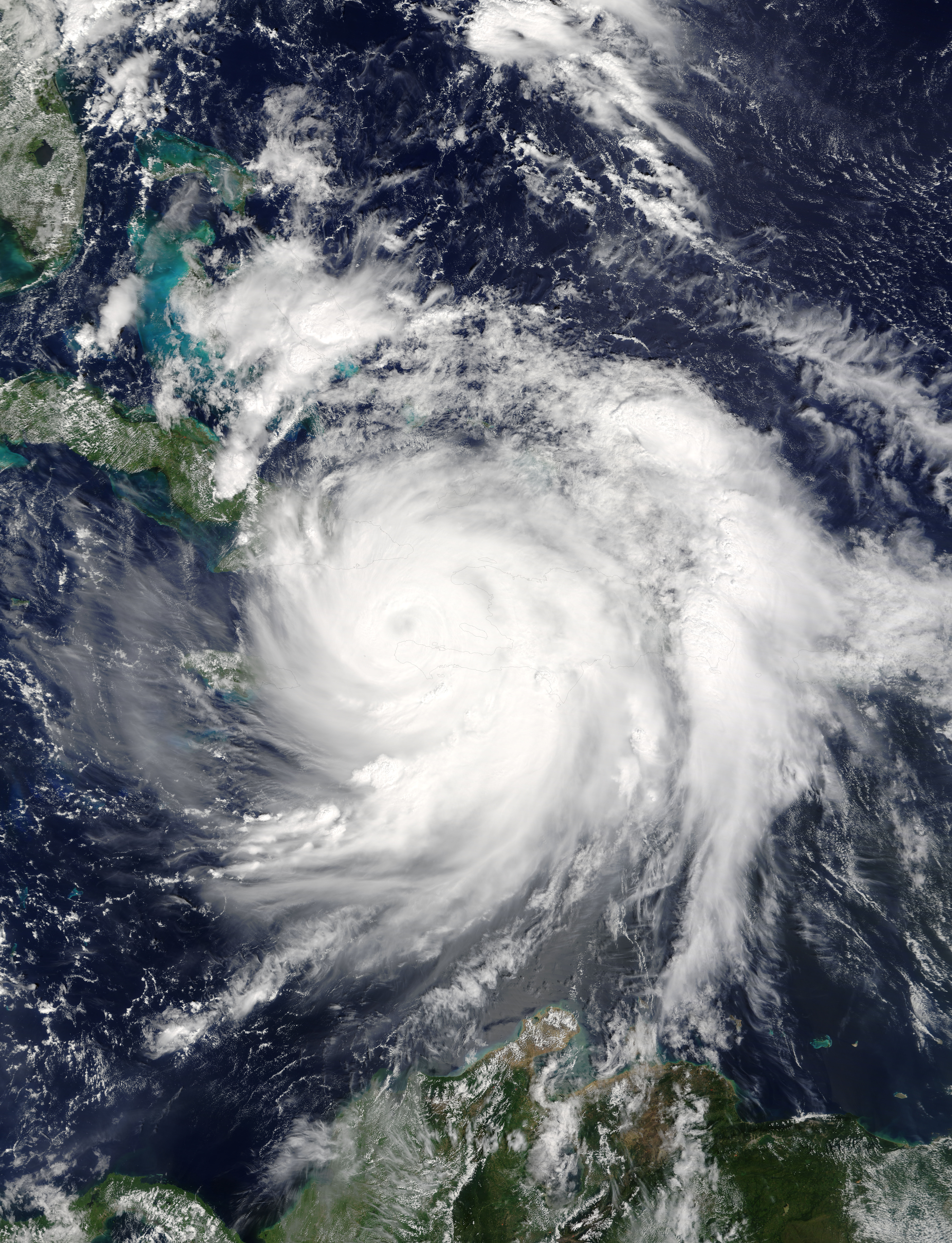
- Satellite image of Hurricane Matthew shortly after landfall on Tiburon Peninsula

Meteorological history
- Duration: October 2–5, 2016

Category 4 major hurricane
- 1-minute sustained (SSHWS/NWS)
- Highest winds: 150 mph (240 km/h)
- Lowest pressure: 934 mbar (hPa); 27.58 inHg

Overall effects
- Fatalities: 674 total
- Damage: $2.8 billion (2016 USD)
- Areas affected: Haiti, primarily the Tiburon Peninsula
- Part of the 2016 Atlantic hurricane season
- History: Meteorological history; Effects: Florida; Haiti; Other wikis: Commons: Matthew images

Hurricane Matthew struck southwestern Haiti near Les Anglais on October 4, 2016, leaving widespread damage in the impoverished nation. Matthew was a late-season Category 5 hurricane on the Saffir–Simpson scale, having formed in the southeastern Caribbean on September 28. The hurricane weakened to Category 4 before making landfall near Les Anglais on October 4, at which time the National Hurricane Center estimated maximum sustained winds of 240 km/h (150 mph). This made it the strongest storm to hit the nation since Hurricane Cleo in 1964, and the third strongest Haitian landfall on record. Hurricane-force winds – 119 km/h (74 mph) or greater – affected about 1.125 million people in the country. The Haitian government assessed the death toll at 674, although other sources reported more than three times that figure.

During Matthew's passage, high winds, heavy rainfall, and deadly tides lashed the Tiburon Peninsula in southwest Haiti. Nationwide, the hurricane nearly or completely destroyed around 200,000 homes, leaving 1.4 million people in need of humanitarian aid. Monetary damage was estimated at US$2.8 billion. Nearly complete crop damage occurred in Grand'Anse and Sud departments, leaving the impoverished population without a source of food. Communication networks and the road system were also compromised. After the hurricane washed away the Petit-Goâve Bridge, southwestern Haiti was temporarily unreachable from the remainder of the country, which slowed the distribution of emergency aid. The ongoing cholera outbreak worsened after the hurricane, killing at least 29 people.

With insufficient resources to respond to the hurricane damage, the Haitian government requested assistance from other countries. The United Nations launched an emergency appeal for nearly US$120 million in aid, and countries throughout the world provided money, supplies, and logistical support. Before and after the hurricane's landfall, UN agencies provided food, materials, and a peacekeeping force to residents, which was supplemented by various non-government organizations.

== Preparations ==
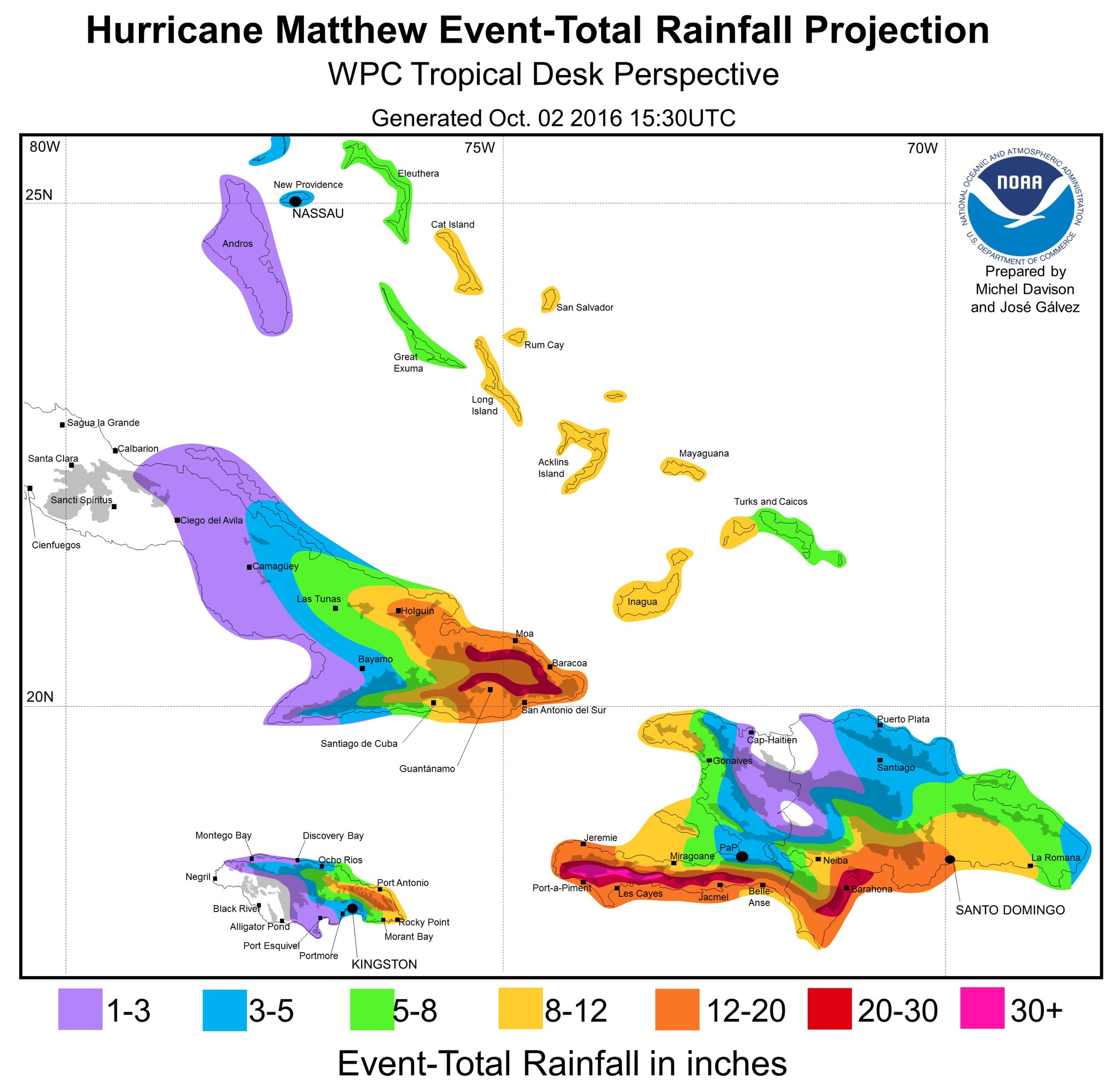
A map of forecast rainfall totals from Hurricane Matthew for the Greater Antilles and the Bahamas. Peak accumulations in excess of 76 cm (30 in) were expected along the southern coast of Haiti's Tiburon Peninsula.

On September 30, the Haitian government issued a tropical storm watch for Haiti's Tiburon Peninsula toward the border with the Dominican Republic, although the forecast at the time was for Matthew to pass over Jamaica. Following an eastward shift in Matthew's predicted track, this was changed to a hurricane watch and later warning that encompassed the entire country. The government activated its National Emergency Operations Center, ordered a halt to coastal shipping, and started issuing evacuation notices. Residents on outlying islands of Haiti were evacuated to the mainland. Provisional President Jocelerme Privert addressed the nation on October 2, urging those living along the coast and in poorly constructed homes to evacuate and comply with authorities. On the same day, the government issued a red alert, advising residents to listen to instructions from authorities, secure their property, and prepare food kits.

Although government officials held meetings on storm preparation, Radio France Internationale reported that Haiti did not have the logistical capability to handle a large-scale disaster. Only 576 shelters, with a collective capacity of 90,000 people, were listed for all of southern Haiti. Despite pleas from officials, many residents refused to leave their homes. A total of 1,300 shelters were readied with a total capacity of 390,000 people, insufficient for the population threatened in the storm path. Citing this problem and civic responsibility, officials asked residents in secure homes to welcome vulnerable neighbors. The Haitian government sent funds to 145 municipalities, after mayors complained that they had insufficient supplies. Government offices remained open during the storm, while schools were closed from October 3–10 to serve as shelters, causing the school calendar to be adjusted. By the day before the storm made landfall, 340,000 people had evacuated to these shelters. At least 500 people evacuated from Jérémie, and patients at the Les Cayes hospital were evacuated. In Ouest, which contains the capital Port-au-Prince, about 55,000 people evacuated ahead of the storm. Although civil protection officials took to the streets to warn people, many residents were unaware that Matthew was even approaching the country a day before its expected landfall. Evacuations continued through the hurricane's landfall with the total number of people in shelters reaching 9,280 by 2:00 a.m. local time on October 4. Hundreds of prisoners were also evacuated to safer areas during the storm passage.

More than 18,000 volunteers and members of the Red Cross, community intervention teams, municipal committees, and local emergency services were readied to assist residents. According to the International Organization for Migration (IOM), 55,107 internally displaced persons remained in camps or hosting sites without adequate protection from the hurricane. Ahead of the storm, the Agency for Technical Cooperation and Development (ACTED) sent a crew of 35 people to seven shelters in southwestern Haiti, capable of disaster assessment and providing relief in the storm aftermath. The United Nations Disaster Assessment and Coordination also sent a team to assist the efforts of the Haitian government, and the United States Agency for International Development (USAID) also activated its crew within the country. Ahead of the storm, officials shut down the Hugo Chávez and Toussaint Louverture international airports, causing several flights to be canceled. The airport in Port-au-Prince remained closed until October 6, only allowing in planes carrying humanitarian aid. Officials also halted travel by cars during the storm's passage until October 5.

== Impacts ==
On October 4 at 11:00 UTC, the storm made landfall on the Tiburon Peninsula of southwestern Haiti near Les Anglais at this intensity. Matthew was third strongest on record to hit the country, and the strongest to hit Haiti since Hurricane Cleo in 1964, which also made landfall at Category 4 strength.

Haiti, the poorest country in the Western Hemisphere, was recovering from an ongoing cholera outbreak and a powerful earthquake in 2010, and many houses damaged during the earthquake were not rebuilt when Matthew struck. There were 25 humanitarian organizations working in impoverished Grand'Anse in southwestern Haiti before the storm made landfall. Ahead of the annual hurricane season, the World Food Programme (WFP) had pre-positioned 3,410 tons of food in the form of High Energy Biscuits, 30 tons of which were utilized immediately following the storm. Life-threatening rainfall was forecast to affect much of the nation, with accumulations averaging 38 to 64 cm (15 to 25 in) along the southern coast with isolated peaks up to 100 cm (40 in).

Hurricane Matthew made landfall over southwestern Haiti as a powerful Category 4 hurricane on the morning of October 4. According to UNOSAT, Matthew affected about 1.125 million people with hurricane–force winds – at least 119 km/h (74 mph) – mostly in Sud. In Ouest, which contains the capital Port-au-Prince, nearly 4 million people experienced winds of at least 60 km/h (37 mph). Heavy rainfall ranged from 20 to 40 in (510 to 1,020 mm) across southern Haiti, with 24 hour totals of over 7.9 in (200 mm) around the Gulf of Gonâve. The storm surge, estimated around 9.8 ft (3 m), flooded at least 11 municipalities along the coast. Haiti politician François Anick Joseph described the storm effects in the southern portion of the country as "complete destruction". The World Bank and the Inter-American Development Bank estimated total damage around $1.89 billion. Nationwide, the hurricane severely damaged about 200,000 homes, with 90% of the houses along the southern coast destroyed. The storm knocked down 90% of coconut trees on the Tiburon Peninsula, and destroyed entire coffee and cocoa plantations. With most of the region's crops destroyed and 350,350 animals killed, residents in southern Haiti were left without a source of food.

Matthew's strong winds knocked power lines and cell towers, which limited communications in the days following the storm, and left about 80% of the Tiburon Peninsula without power. A damaged antenna cut communications with Sud, and there were interruptions to the Digicel mobile phone network. Excessive flooding along 13 watersheds, as well as the heavy forestry damage, killed many forest and fruit species. The flooding produced mudslides that washed out roads and bridges. Along Route Nationale #2, the hurricane washed away the Petit-Goâve Bridge, which is the only bridge linking the nation's capital Port-au-Prince with southwestern Haiti. This meant that relief workers and supplies temporarily had to travel by air to reach the most affected areas. A temporary bridge to transport humanitarian relief was constructed by October 6. Across southern Haiti, the hurricane damaged 70% of the polling locations for the Haitian presidential election scheduled for October 9; as a result of the storm, the election was postponed to an undetermined date on October 5. Nationwide, Matthew damaged over 400 schools, while 150 other schools functioned as shelters for around 16,000 evacuees. Damage to schools affected about 130,000 children, many of whom had just started their school year, and were in need of a new location for their education. Of the nation's 15 main hospitals, one was destroyed and another four were damaged, with 35 medical clinics damaged, many of these were understaffed and unable to cope with the number of incoming patients.

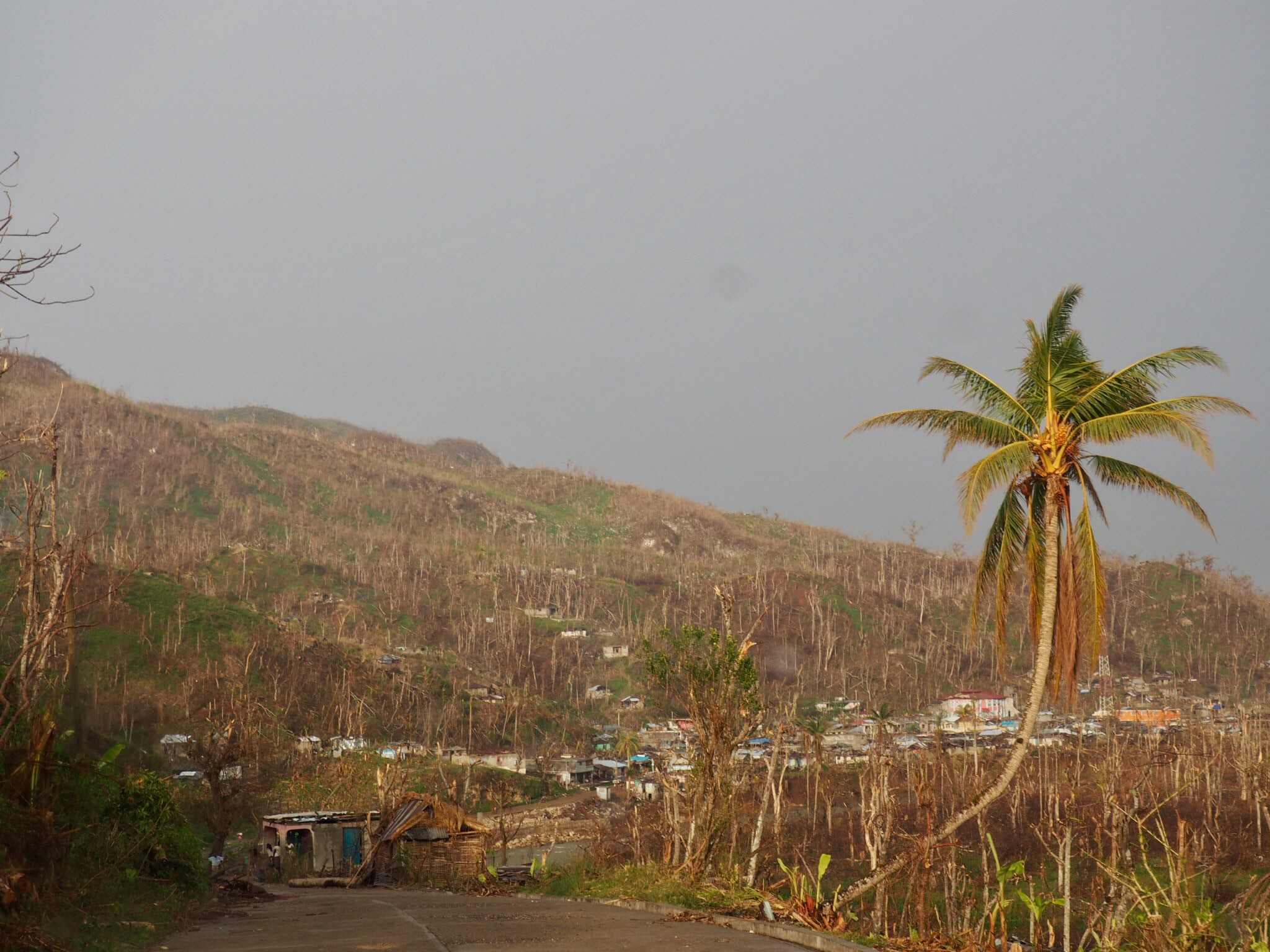
The hurricane's violent winds shredded vegetation across the Tiburon Peninsula, rendering the lush tropical landscape brown and barren.

Before Matthew moved ashore, a sick woman died in Port-Salut due to high storm tides preventing her travel to a hospital, and a man was missing as a result of a boat wreck. Hurricane Matthew proved deadly for the country; one day after the storm made landfall, there were five known fatalities related to the storm, which rose to 108 by October 6, including 50 people killed in the coastal town of Roche-à-Bateaux. The death toll increased sharply to 842 by the next day, once the hardest hit areas of the Tiburon Peninsula were reached; many of the fatalities were due to people refusing to evacuate and who were trapped beneath the rubble of destroyed houses. This included 264 deaths in Sud, of whom 158 died in Les Anglais where Matthew moved ashore. There were at least 500 fatalities in Grand'Anse, and nationwide as many as 1,600 unconfirmed deaths. These numbers were lower according to the Haitian government, which reported a death toll of 546 as of October 15.

=== Effects by region ===
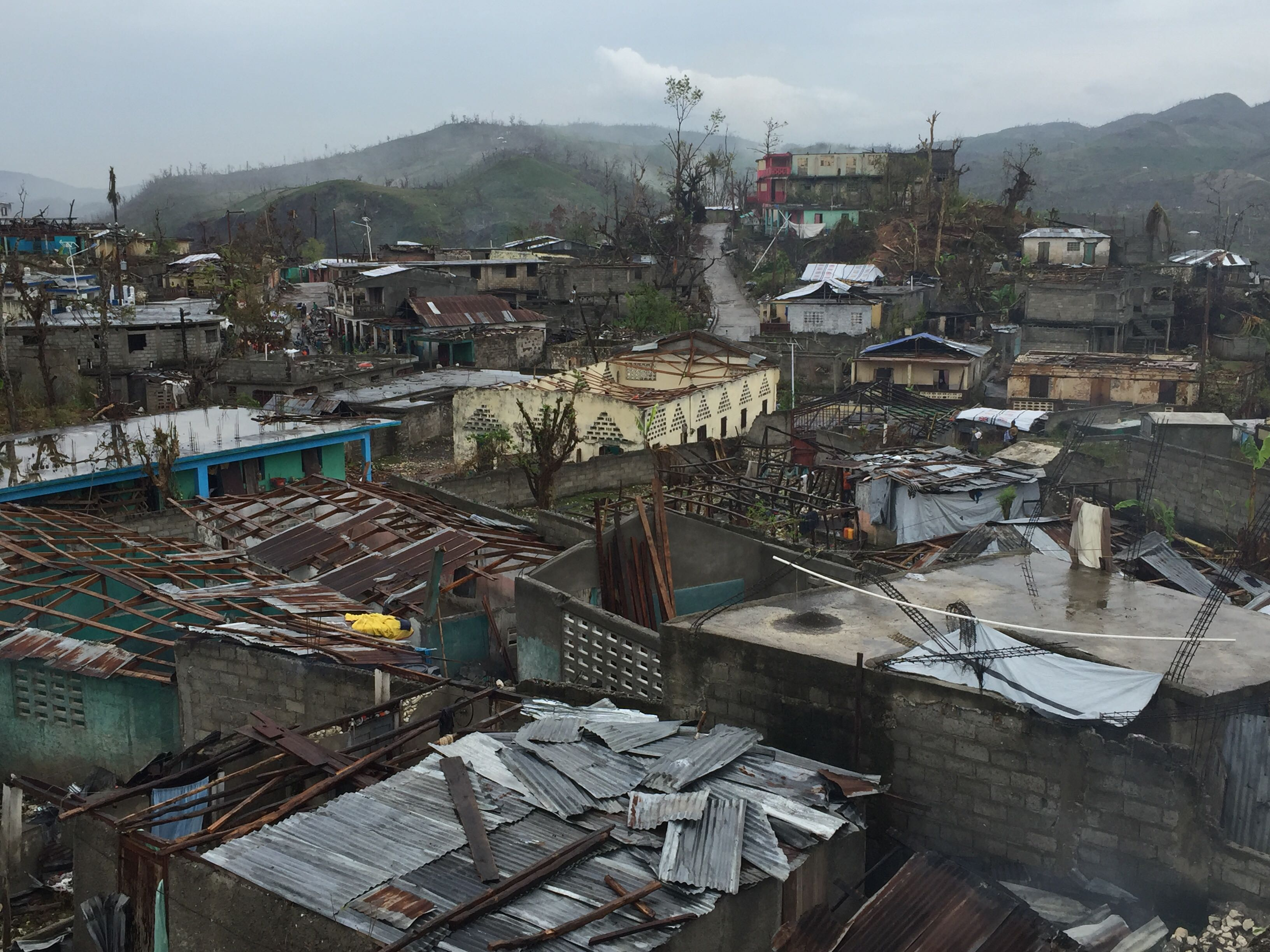
Poorly constructed homes failed to withstand hurricane-force winds. Countless corrugated tin roofs fell victim to the storm.

Grand'Anse bore the brunt of Hurricane Matthew, becoming isolated after communications networks were cut. Throughout the department, the hurricane destroyed or severely damaged 86,223 houses, which displaced about 99,400 families. Almost every tree in Grand'Anse was knocked down, while nearly all rivers were flooded. Nearly all of the crops in the department were destroyed, and about half of all livestock were killed. In Jérémie, the capital of the department, the strong winds ripped off nearly every roof, damaging 13,753 buildings. The hurricane decimated every building not made of concrete, including 90% of houses, and 80% of all structures. Floods in Jérémie inundated an orphanage, forcing 123 children to be evacuated, and 141 roads were damaged.

In Sud, Hurricane Matthew severely damaged 15 of the 18 communes. The storm destroyed 95% of all shelters and at least 29,000 homes, along with most ports and fishing equipment. Damage was most significant in Les Cayes, capital of Sud. Ten hours of high wind gusts destroyed the roofs of most houses, shops, and service stations, including the main cathedral, injuring over 3,000 people. About 70–80% of the houses in the city lost their roof or were flooded, of which around 20% had collapsed walls. Several businesses were washed away in Les Cayes. Île-à-Vache, an island adjacent to Les Cayes, reported floods up to 4 ft (1.2 m) deep. Livestock were killed when farms "disappeared", according to a member of Heifer International. All crops in the city were damaged, and over 90% of the crops wrecked throughout the department.

Significant damage to crops, fisheries, and livestock occurred in Nippes, Ouest, Sud-Est, Artibonite, and Nord-Ouest departments. High damage in Nippes left half of the population in need of humanitarian aid. In Grand-Goâve toward the eastern end of the Tiburon Peninsula, Matthew damaged or destroyed 500 houses, killing seven in the city. The road to Jacmel along the southeastern coast of Haiti was damaged, and many houses in the city were damaged. In Belle-Anse, located in the same department as Jacmel, Matthew destroyed about 80% of the crops. After the water flow increased at the Péligre Dam in Centre department, residents downstream were warned for potentially further flooding. In Gressier, the hurricane wrecked about 80% of agriculture plantations. Several neighborhoods around Port-au-Prince lost power and were flooded during the storm due to the rising levels of the Rivière Grise; a bridge along the river was closed due to floodwaters. Also in the city, the hurricane damaged or destroyed 352 shelters or tents for 14 camps of internally displaced people, along with 279 latrines. In Artibonite, Matthew flooded 1,350 houses and left 123,000 people without a source of food. The storm also destroyed about 60% of the crops in Nord-Ouest. On the offshore Gonâve Island, Matthew's strong winds destroyed the roofs of hundreds of homes and much of the island's roads and crops.

== Aftermath ==
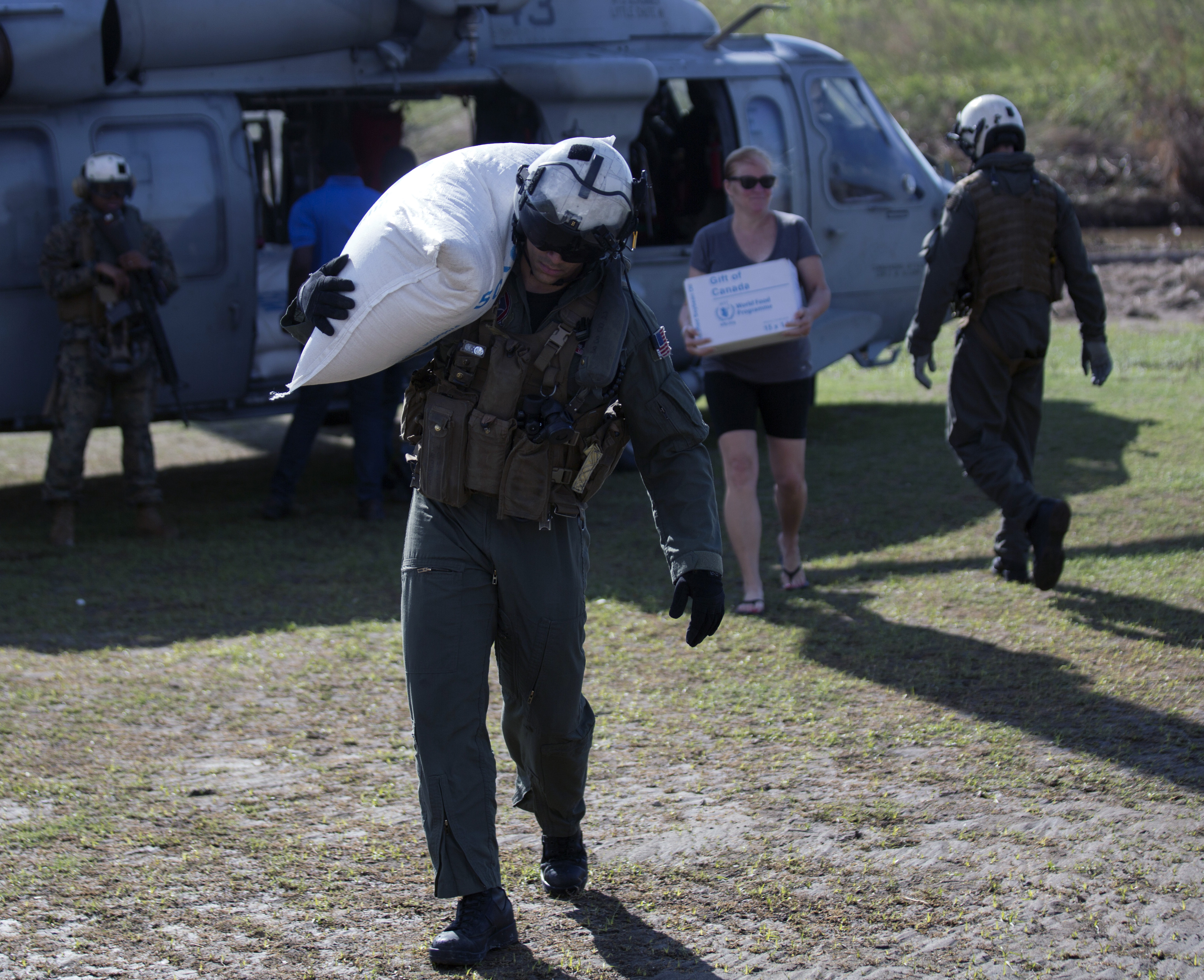
An American soldier delivers aid to a damaged village

The destructive effects of Hurricane Matthew left about 12.9% of Haiti's population – 1.4 million people – in need of humanitarian assistance, of whom about 40% were children and another 40% were women of reproductive age. It was the largest disaster in the country since the 2010 earthquake. Within six days of the storm's landfall, 175,509 people were residing in 224 temporary shelters, as people left their damaged houses for safety. There were reports that the shelters had insufficient water or food. Thousands of children were separated from their parents after the hurricane or were living in orphanages, lacking basic necessities. At least 2,000 of these children were evacuated by Save the Children. The nearly-destroyed city of Jérémie remained inaccessible to humanitarian aid groups for four days, lacking water and with little food for five days. Ganthier near the eastern border with the Dominican Republic suffered famine-like conditions and little water access in the aftermath of the hurricane. The price of rice and tin rose after the storm, leaving poor residents unable to afford food in areas that did not receive supplies. Damaged infrastructure and blocked roads prevented more expedient distribution of relief supplies, leaving storm victims without food or assistance for up to two weeks in isolated areas. By October 20, nearly 806,000 people were facing critical food shortages.

Interim Haitian President Jocelerme Privert declared three days of national mourning, beginning on October 9. On the previous day, the country's travel ban by water was lifted, and communications were generally restored with the southwestern portion of the country. The Digicel network had restored 98% of the cellular network by October 15, including much of the worst hit areas. Within two weeks of the hurricane landfall, schools began to be reopened, and roads were gradually restored, which allowed for easier travel for humanitarian groups. By October 21, 80% of affected communities had road access restored. Based on the heavy storm damage, the Haitian government received over $20 million from the Caribbean Catastrophe Risk Insurance Facility Segregated Portfolio Company, which provides disaster insurance for nations in the Caribbean.

=== International assistance ===
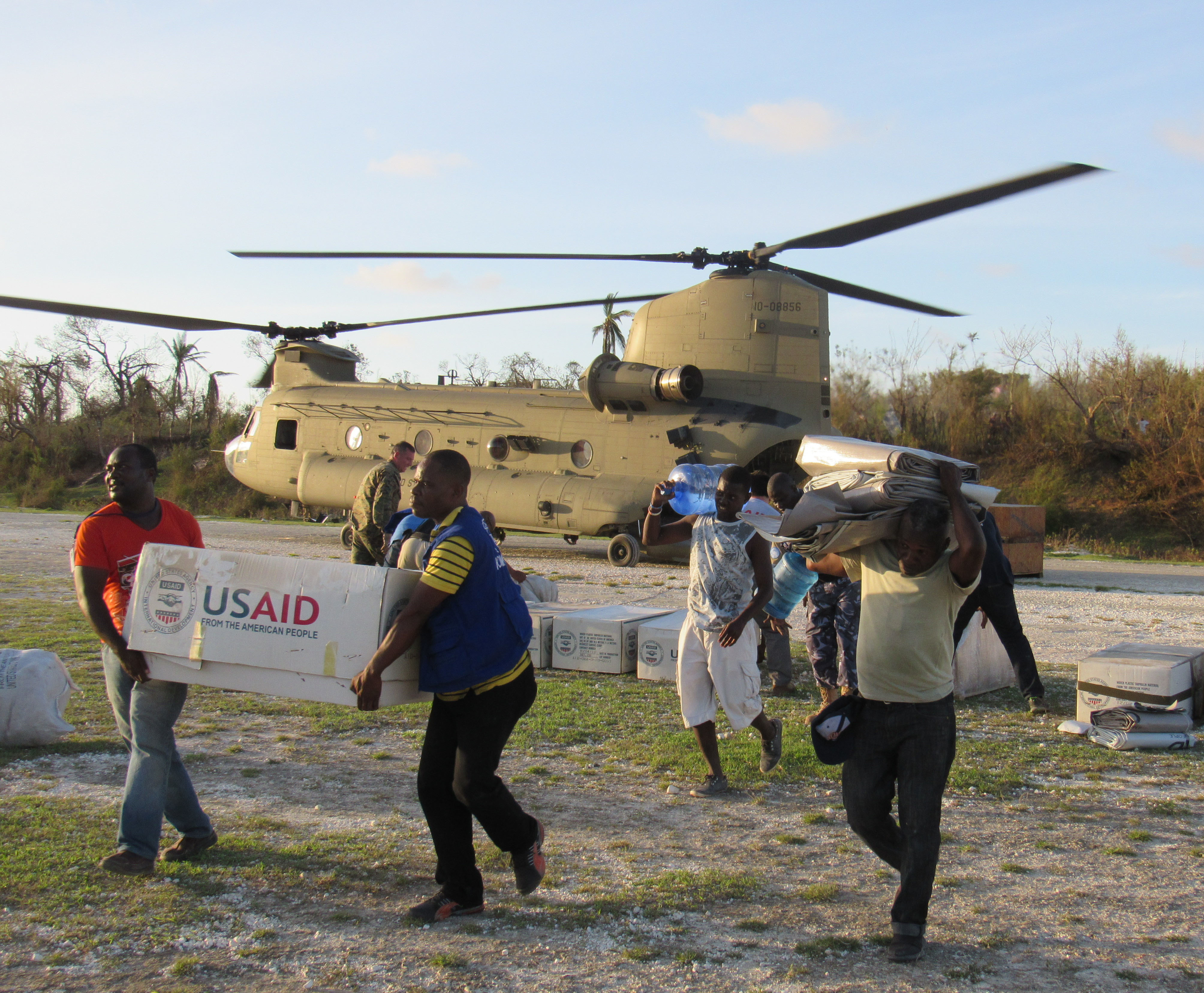
Service members from Joint Task Force Matthew and representatives from the United States Agency of International Development delivered relief supplies to areas affected by Hurricane Matthew to Jeremie, Haiti

On October 3, the Haitian government requested emergency assistance from the United Nations and other international agencies. On the same day, the International Charter Space and Major Disasters was activated, allowing charitable organizations to use satellite data for their relief work. Due to the hurricane damage, UN Secretary-General Ban Ki-moon recommended extending the peacekeeping force at existing levels until April 2017, and the Security Council passed Resolution 2313 on October 13 to extend the mission. The Secretary-General visited Haiti on October 15, taking an aerial tour of the damage and meeting local officials. Eight days earlier, the UN Central Emergency Response Fund provided a grant of $5 million toward rebuilding efforts, and the WFP began sending out 551 tons of food. By October 13, the WFP and other non-government organizations distributed 1,540 tons of food to nearly 58,000 people. In Port-au-Prince, earthquake survivors in damaged camps received 8,000 emergency kits from the IOM, while the United Nations peacekeeping force helped clear roads. The United Nations Development Programme provided short-term jobs to 1,416 people in Grand-Goâve to clear debris in their damaged villages, after 90% of people in the town lost their source of income.

In the storm's aftermath, humanitarian agencies had about 400 operations throughout Haiti to provide relief to storm victims. Several non-government organizations worked to provide needs for storm victims, including ACTED, Action Against Hunger, All Hands Volunteers, CARE, Direct Relief, Lutheran World Relief, Mercy Corps, Oxfam, Plan International, Project HOPE, Tzu Chi, World Concern, and World Vision International. These agencies provided water, food, blankets, medicine, plastic sheets, and water chlorination tablets. Direct Relief sent 86 pallets of medical supplies to Haiti worth $13 million. Catholic Relief Services provided $5 million toward disaster relief. Relief agencies were concerned that the aid would not reach those most in need, and that reconstruction would not have input from local officials. By eight days after the storm, people began rebuilding their houses in Les Cayes and on the road west from the city, although the supplies were insufficient for the population. Concern Worldwide brought relief supplies to Gonâve Island by boat, including tarps, blankets, and water tablets. To determine the scale of the damage, the Caribbean Disaster Emergency Management Agency sent a team of six people assisting the efforts of the Emergency Operation Centre in Jérémie and Les Cayes. The Pan American Health Organization sent six teams of health experts to the hardest hit areas, along with medicine and other supplies. The International Red Cross and Red Crescent Movement approved an appeal of CHF5 million to help 13,500 families, sending its first flight of aid on October 9. Flooding rains affected Haiti on October 21, disrupting relief efforts.

On October 9, the United Nations launched an emergency appeal for aid for the country, requesting nearly US$120 million to provide for the needs of the storm victims. Within ten days, governments and relief agencies had pledged US$40.1 million toward the recovery. The government of neighboring Dominican Republic provided wood, medicine, and mattresses, and asked that its citizens contribute what they can to the recovery. The island of Dominica donated US$100,000 to Haiti as well as the Bahamas, which was later struck by Matthew. The government of Venezuela sent two boats with 20 tons of supplies, including medicine, water, and food. Canada donated C$6.08 million in aid toward replenishing drinking water.

The United States Navy sent three vessels to Haiti to help respond to the storm – the USS George Washington, USS Mesa Verde, and the USNS Comfort, the last of which functions as a hospital ship. The Mesa Verde, stationed off Haiti's southern coast, had personnel and supplies for areas inaccessible by road. Due to improved road access and logistical support, the American military finished their operations by October 21. In total, the American government provided $37.9 million to fund its efforts in the country. The first flight of American aid arrived in Port-au-Prince on October 8, beginning the transfer of 480 tons of supplies.

Outside of the Americas, the European Union provided €1.755 million in funds. The United Kingdom pledged £8 million in funds toward providing temporary shelters that had equipment to purify water, as well as cholera prevention. Ireland provided €1.7 million toward the recovery efforts. Two Dutch ships helped relief operations in areas inaccessible by road. France sent two reconnaissance helicopters to survey the affected areas, as well as two water purification systems capable of producing 66,000 gallons (250,000 litres) each per day, valued at €814,000. The Spanish Red Cross sent 5 tons of relief supplies, Estonia donated €50,000 to the WHO, and the Luxembourg Red Cross flew a team of disaster experts. Switzerland also flew a team of experts in shelter-building, security, and water restoration, allocating CHF2 million toward the project. Japan granted US$3 million and donated tents through its International Cooperation Agency. South Korea donated US$350,000, and the Singapore Red Cross provided US$30,000 toward medicine and water. Australia donated A$3.5 million to UNICEF and the IOM.

=== Health and cholera outbreak ===
In the Port-a-Piment hospital, dozens of cholera patients spilled out of operating rooms into hallways and courtyards Sunday, mixing with relatives and harried volunteer staff. Children were crying and retching on the tile floor. Babies were lying catatonic with dark circles under their eyes, sprawled on T-shirts and rags, while their parents held up their bags of intravenous fluids."

— The Washington Post,

The ongoing cholera outbreak worsened following the storm, with 1,351 new cases reported by October 21. The storm destroyed 34 cholera treatment centers nationwide, including about 75% of such facilities in Grand'Anse and Sud departments. By October 10, Haitian doctors warned of a "Cholera crisis" in the hurricane's wake. In Port-a-Piment, at least 60 people were treated for the disease, with 4 dying from it. The town's hospital nearly ran out of supplies by this time. In the nearby village of Randel, more than 100 people were infected and at least 25 succumbed to the illness. The Port-Salut hospital received around 100 patients in the days after the storm, 85% of whom due to storm-related injuries. It recorded its first cholera death from the storm on October 9, as reports of the disease increased in the nation. The roads around St. Boniface Hospital in Sud, which has a cholera treatment center, were washed out, making it difficult for the hospital to get supplies. In addition to facing the cholera spread, health officials also worked to contain the Zika outbreak in the aftermath of the storm's flooding.

Relief organizations sent doctors and medical teams to take care of medical needs, including treating for cholera. By October 20, Médecins Sans Frontières had provided medical care for 1,614 people. Civil Protection officials advised residents to only drink treated water, due to the potential for disease spreading by water. The Pan American Health Organization sent epidemiologists to monitor and mitigate the spread of cholera following the storm. The World Health Organization flew around 1 million anti-cholera vaccines to the country. On October 9, the United Nations transferred $8 million to UNICEF toward preventing the spread of disease. A week later, Secretary-General Ban Ki-moon established the UN Haiti Cholera Response Multi-Partner Trust Fund, which provided and managed resources toward fighting cholera. A team from the Association of Medical Doctors of Asia assisted the hospital in Moron, Grand'Anse.

== See also ==
- Hurricane Hazel – strong hurricane that took a similar track through the Caribbean Sea in 1954, which killed up to 1,000 people in Haiti
- Hurricane Jeanne – brushed the northern coast of Hispaniola with heavy rainfall, killing 3,006 people in Haiti, mostly in Gonaïves
