= Tiburon, Haiti =

Tiburon Tibiwon
- Commune
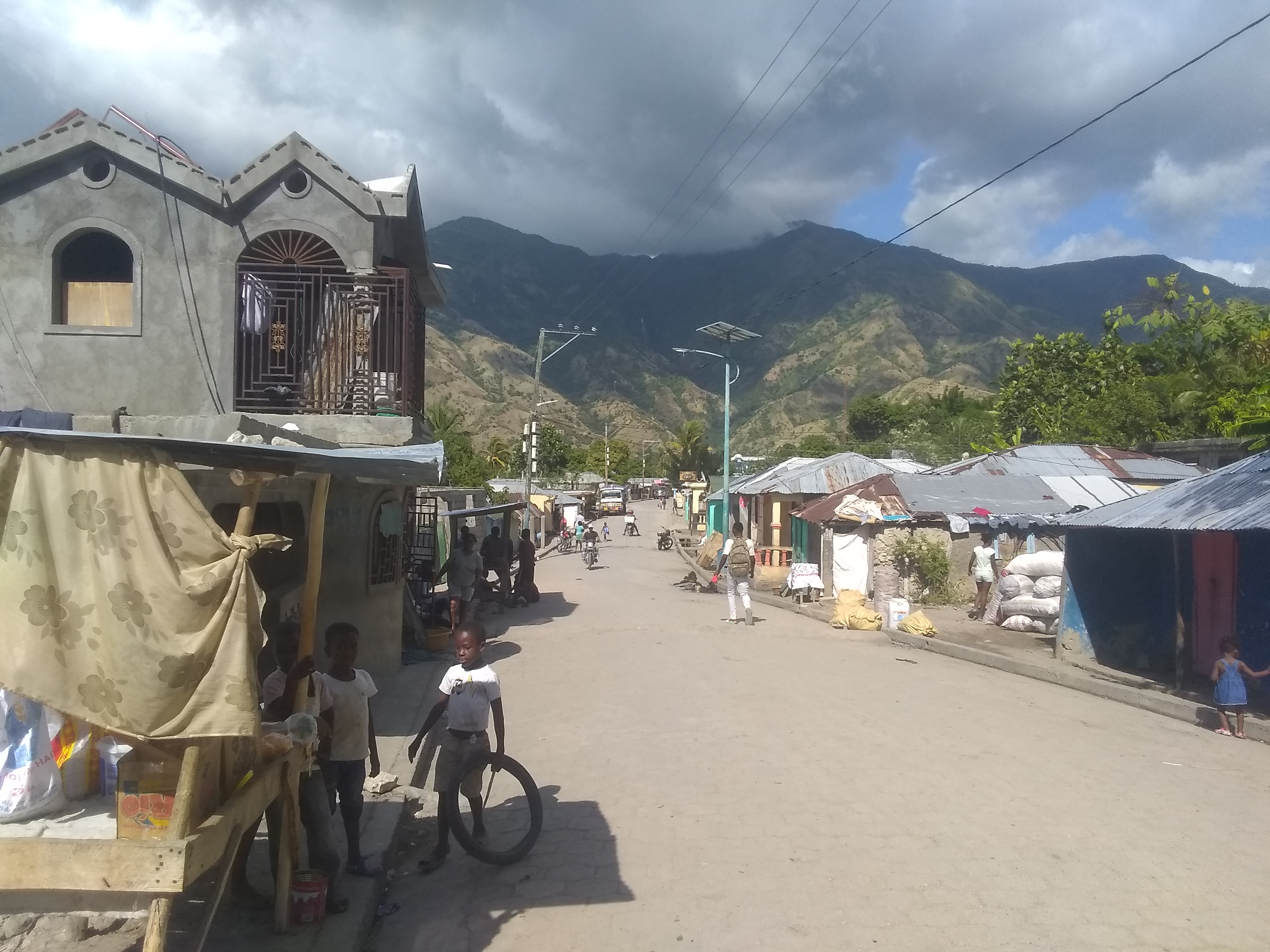
- View of Tiburon, along Route National 2
- Interactive map of Tiburon
- Location in Haiti
- Coordinates: 18°20′0″N 74°24′0″W
- Country: Haiti
- Department: Sud
- Arrondissement: Chardonnières

Area
  - Total: 147.21 km^{2} (56.84 sq mi)
- Elevation: 65 m (213 ft)

Population (2015)
  - Total: 23,279
  - Density: 158.13/km^{2} (409.57/sq mi)
- Time zone: UTC−05:00 (EST)
  - Summer (DST): UTC−04:00 (EDT)
- Postal code: HT 8530

Tiburon (French pronunciation: [tibyʁɔ̃]; Haitian Creole: Tibiwon) is a coastal commune in the Chardonnières Arrondissement, in the Sud department of Haiti. It has 21,170 inhabitants. It is situated in a valley, at the mouth of the Tiburon River.

== Geology ==
The valley of the Tiburon River and the town of Tiburon sit exactly on the Enriquillo–Plantain Garden fault.

== Settlements ==
- Bon Pas
- Carrefour Gros Chaudiere
- Conete
- Dalmate
- Galette Sèche
- Perion
- Plansinte
- Tiburon
- Cap A Foux
