= Effects of Hurricane Matthew in Florida =

Hurricane Matthew
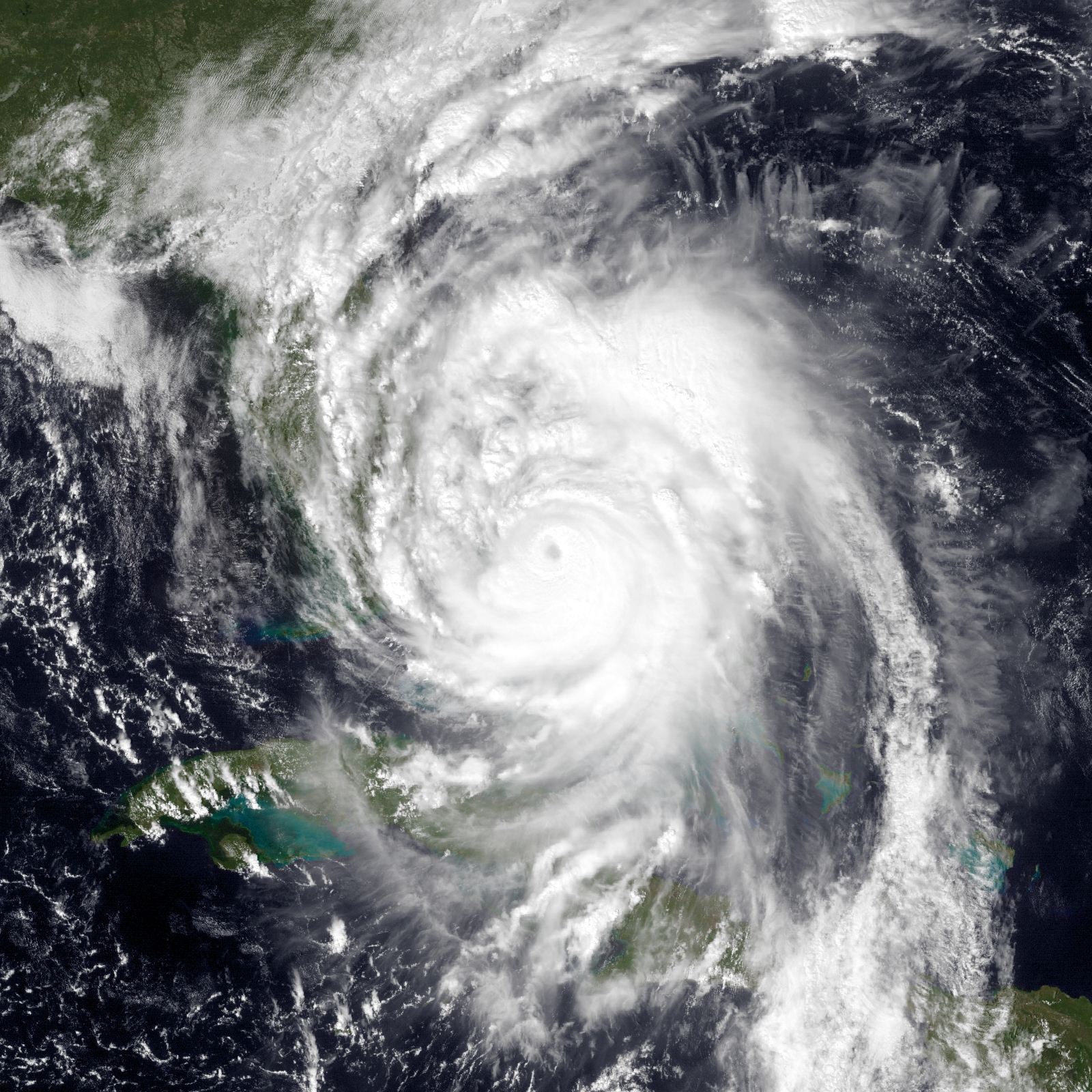
- Satellite image of Hurricane Matthew east of the Florida Peninsula on October 6

Meteorological history
- Duration: October 6–7, 2016

Category 2 hurricane
- 1-minute sustained (SSHWS/NWS)
- Highest winds: 100 mph (155 km/h)
- Lowest pressure: 937 mbar (hPa); 27.67 inHg

Overall effects
- Fatalities: 3 direct, 9 indirect
- Damage: $2.77 billion (2016 USD)
- Areas affected: Florida (especially the First Coast)
- Part of the 2016 Atlantic hurricane season
- History: Meteorological history; Effects: Florida; Haiti; Other wikis: Commons: Matthew images

Hurricane Matthew was the strongest tropical cyclone to threaten and impact Florida since Hurricane Wilma in 2005. Developing into a tropical storm on September 28, Matthew underwent rapid intensification, strengthening to a Category 5 hurricane with winds of 165 mph (266 km/h) by October 1. After slight weakening, Matthew made two landfalls in Haiti and Cuba. Matthew slightly reintensified before making further landfalls in The Bahamas, and then paralleling the coast of the Southeastern United States for 36 hours. Matthew transitioned into an extratropical cyclone on October 10.

While the center of the storm did not actually cross the coastline, the western eyewall of the storm paralleled the coast, with the most eastern portions receiving winds up to Category 2 strength. The storm caused at least three direct deaths and eleven indirect, and up to $2.77 billion (2016 USD) in damages.

== Background ==
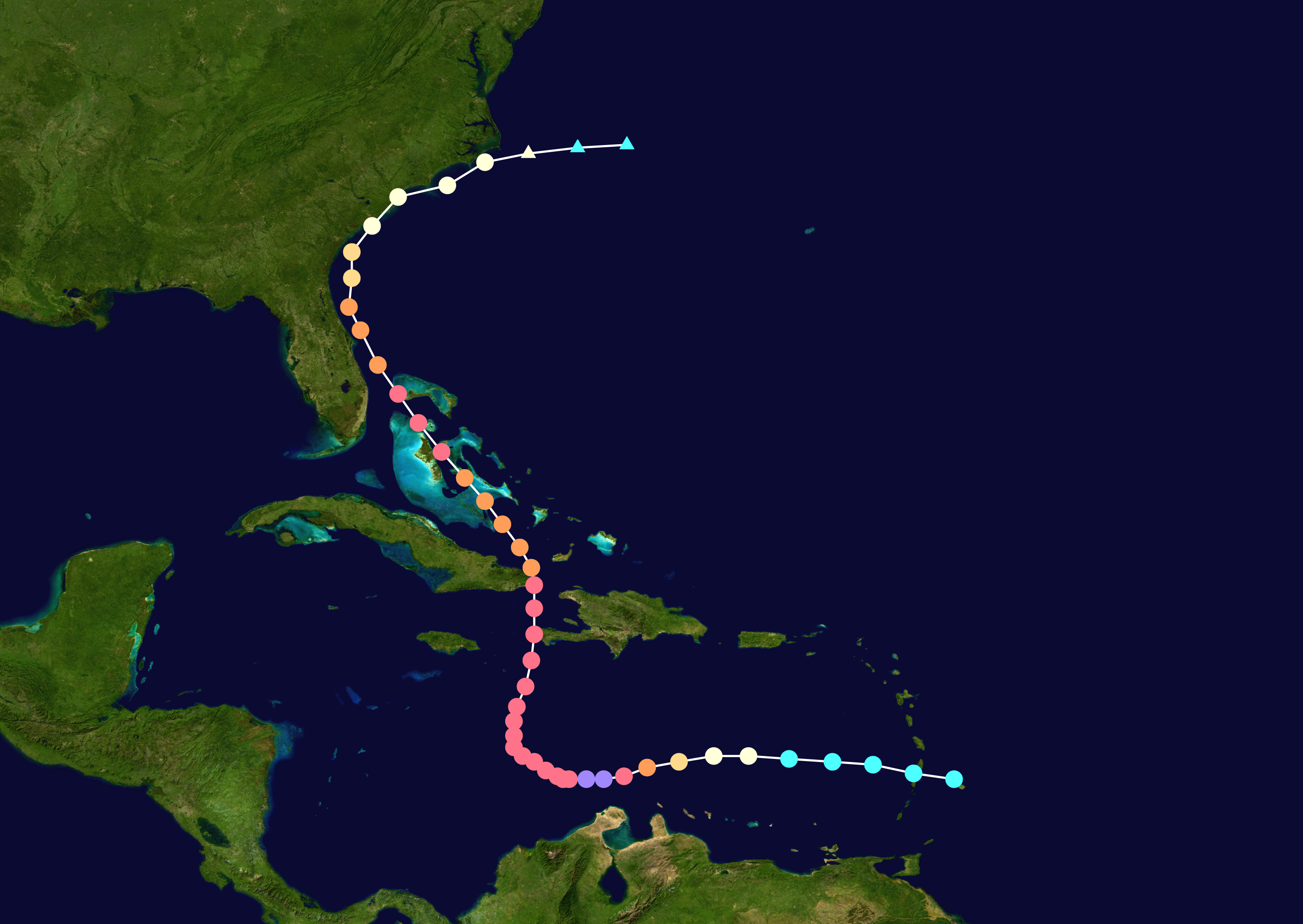
Map plotting the storm's track and intensity, according to the Saffir–Simpson scale Map key Saffir–Simpson scale Tropical depression (≤38 mph, ≤62 km/h) Tropical storm (39–73 mph, 63–118 km/h) Category 1 (74–95 mph, 119–153 km/h) Category 2 (96–110 mph, 154–177 km/h) Category 3 (111–129 mph, 178–208 km/h) Category 4 (130–156 mph, 209–251 km/h) Category 5 (≥157 mph, ≥252 km/h) Unknown Storm type Tropical cyclone Subtropical cyclone Extratropical cyclone, remnant low, tropical disturbance, or monsoon depression

Tropical Storm Matthew developed on September 28 from a tropical wave moving through the southern Lesser Antilles. It intensified over the Caribbean Sea, becoming a hurricane on September 29, and a major hurricane a day later. At 00:00 UTC on October 1, Matthew became a Category 5 on the Saffir-Simpson scale, with peak sustained winds of 270 km/h (170 mph), while located offshore northern Colombia. Around that time, tropical cyclone forecast models noted the potential for Matthew to move close to southern Florida. Weakening slightly, Matthew remained a Category 4 hurricane by the time it made landfalls in southwestern Haiti, southeastern Cuba, and parts of the Bahamas. From October 6–7, Matthew parallelled the east coast of Florida as a Category? 4 hurricane. As late as 03:00 UTC on October 7, computer models predicted that the hurricane would move ashore the state. Instead, the center of Matthew's eye remained 35 mi (55 km) offshore, although the western edge of the eyewall moved over Cape Canaveral. Matthew weakened as it progressed northward, later striking North Carolina, transitioning into an extratropical cyclone, and being absorbed by a cold front.

== Preparations ==
On September 30, Governor Rick Scott made a statement to residents, urging them to be vigilant of the approaching hurricane. Forecasts the following day indicated that Matthew had the potential to be the most powerful hurricane to threaten the state since Wilma in 2005. The state's Division of Emergency Management urged residents to not be complacent and urged those living along the east coast to prepare accordingly. Governor Scott began regular phone conferences with Rick Knabb—the director of the National Hurricane Center—and officials in all 67 counties on October 2. Although the center of Matthew was forecast to remain offshore, Scott stated: "This storm is catastrophic, and if it hits our state, we could see impacts that we have not seen in many years". All counties were placed under a state of emergency on October 3 in accordance with Executive Order 16-230. This enabled the allocation of federal funds for emergency preparations to ensure the safety of residents. The Florida National Guard was placed on standby and fuel trucks were placed along the Florida Turnpike for quick deployment anywhere in the state. About 200 National Guardsmen were deployed on October 4. On the afternoon of October 4, Everglades National Park and Biscayne National Park were shut down.

Grade schools and universities across the East Coast announced closures for October 6–9. A further 1,200 members of the Florida National Guard were deployed on this day, and another 2,000 on October 6. The state government opened 130 shelters while the American Red Cross opened 97 of their own. The Florida Department of Transportation suspended all construction projects on interstates, limited access facilities, coastal, and evacuation route roadways. Bridges along the Intracoastal Waterway were to be shut down prior to the onset of gale-force winds. All tunnels in the Miami Metropolitan Area were closed and the Tri-Rail suspended service for the duration of Matthew's passage. Service at Fort Lauderdale-Hollywood International Airport, North Perry Airport, and Orlando Sanford International Airport was suspended on October 6, resulting in the cancellation of hundreds of flights. A further 600 flights were canceled at Miami International Airport; however, the airport remained open. Numerous flights to aforementioned airports were diverted to Tampa International to compensate for closures.

In preparation for heavy rainfall, the United States Army Corps of Engineers maximized water discharges in Lake Okeechobee while the South Florida Water Management District lowered canal levels. More than 50 state parks and campgrounds were closed across the state.

On October 5, Port Canaveral was closed by the U.S. Coast Guard, the first closure since 2004. Eight cruise ships and four cargo ships were scheduled to visit the port between October 5–9. On Cape Canaveral, home to both civilian and military spaceflight facilities, no rockets or spacecraft were in vulnerable positions; at the time of Matthew's approach, the next launch was scheduled for November 4. The Kennedy Space Center began preparations of the facilities on October 5. Older buildings at the KSC were designed to withstand winds of 105–125 mph (170–200 km/h); buildings constructed after 1992, when Category 5 Hurricane Andrew struck the Miami area, are built to withstand 130 mph (210 km/h) winds. At Cape Canaveral Air Force Station, the U.S. Air Force's 45th Space Wing began disconnecting electric power to non-essential facilities on October 4.

- Volusia, including mandatory curfew
- Seminole curfew

=== Evacuations ===
We have not seen a hurricane this strong in almost a decade.... If instructed to evacuate, don't wait. You can always repair and rebuild – and we'll be here to help you do that. The most important thing you can do is keep you and your family safe."

— Florida Governor Rick Scott, October 6, 2016, press briefing

With Matthew forecast to track roughly parallel to the Florida coastline, meteorologists at the National Hurricane Center noted that expected impacts would be difficult to quantify for specific locations. Relatively small-scale deviations in the hurricane's track would drastically change the potential impacts; a wobble west would bring Category 3 conditions onshore while a wobble east would keep hurricane-force winds offshore. Mandatory evacuations began on October 5 for barrier islands in Brevard County; voluntary evacuations also took place in Duval, Flagler, and St. Lucie counties. By the morning of October 6, approximately 1.5 million people were under evacuation orders in Brevard, Broward, Clay, DeSoto, Duval, Flagler, Indian River, Martin, Miami-Dade, Nassau, Palm Beach, St. John's, St. Lucie, and Volusia counties. This included relocation of patients in various hospitals, including Baptist Medical Center Beaches, Health First Cape Canaveral Hospital, Florida Hospital Oceanside, Florida Hospital New Symrna, Baptist Medical Center Nassau, and Wuesthoff Medical Center. In a public warning, Governor Scott bluntly told residents that "this storm will kill you," should they choose to not evacuate. Road tolls were suspended in evacuating counties, and later to all affected counties. Gridlock on Interstate 10 out of Jacksonville hampered evacuation efforts. Approximately 17,000 people living on barrier islands in Martin County were urged to leave; however, many opted to ride out the storm.

Despite dire warnings from officials in the Jacksonville area, only 30 percent of residents in the coastal communities of Jacksonville Beach, Atlantic Beach, and Neptune Beach evacuated. With the aforementioned communities only linked to the mainland by bridge, no emergency services would be available to them during the storm.

=== Watches and warnings ===
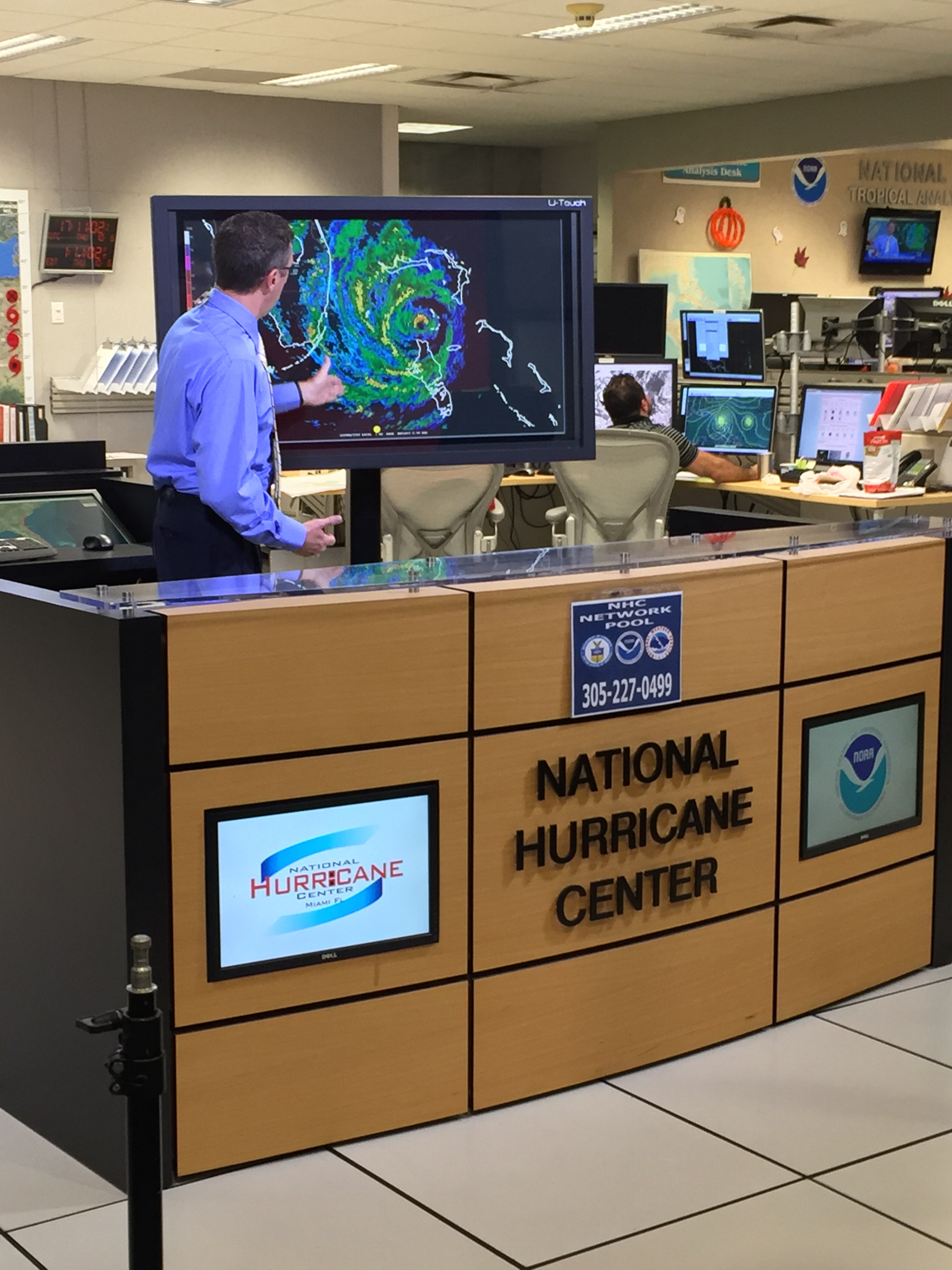
National Hurricane Center Director Richard Knabb (pictured) regularly filmed briefings on the forecast and expected impacts of Hurricane Matthew in the United States.

While Matthew was crossing the Gulf of Gonâve on October 4, the National Hurricane Center issued a hurricane watch for eastern Florida from Deerfield Beach north the Volusia–Brevard county line; a tropical storm watch was also raised for southeastern Florida from Seven Mile Bridge in the Florida Keys to Deerfield Beach as well as Lake Okeechobee. The watch over Lake Okeechobee was upgraded to a hurricane watch hours later. As Matthew crossed Cuba, hurricane warnings were raised for areas between Golden Beach and Sebastian Inlet as well as Lake Okeechobee; the hurricane watch was extended north to include Flagler County; furthermore, a tropical storm warning was issued for areas between Chokoloskee to Golden Beach, including the Florida Keys and Florida Bay. With Matthew posing a threat to the entire east coast of Florida, the hurricane watch was further extended to the Florida–Georgia border early on October 5. The hurricane warning area expanded farther north throughout the day, extending to the Flagler–Volusia county line at 15:00 UTC, and the Florida–Georgia border at 03:00 UTC on October 6. Furthermore, a new tropical storm watch was raised for areas along the Gulf Coast from Chokoloskee to Suwannee River. A tropical storm warning was later issued on October 6 along the Gulf Coast for areas between the Anclote River to Suwannee River. As Matthew tracked along the Florida coast, watches and warnings were steadily discontinued from south to north on October 7 and 8.

=== Athletics and theme parks ===
The Southeastern Conference football matchup between LSU and Florida, scheduled for October 8 in Gainesville, was canceled. The National Hockey League preseason game between the Florida Panthers and Tampa Bay Lightning was canceled as well.

For the fourth time in its 45-year history, the Walt Disney World Resort closed. Its theme parks, water parks, Magic Kingdom, Epcot, Disney's Hollywood Studios, Disney's Animal Kingdom, Disney's Blizzard Beach, Disney's Typhoon Lagoon, Disney Springs, ESPN Wide World of Sports Complex and the resort hotels were all closed by 5:00 p.m. Eastern Time on October 6 and did not reopen until October 8. This was the first time since 2004 that the parks have closed, with all of but one of those instances happening due to hurricanes. Other Orlando-area theme parks, including Universal Orlando Resort theme parks, Universal's Islands of Adventure, Universal Studios Florida, Universal CityWalk and SeaWorld Orlando, also closed.

- stuff
- Daytona speedway

== Impacts ==
Property damage directly related to Hurricane Matthew reached at least $1.173 billion across Florida with an additional $318.5 million incurred to the power grid, for a damage total of at least $1.492 billion. By March 2017, more than 119,000 property damage claims were filed, with Brevard, Duval, Flagler, St. Johns, and Volusia accounting for the majority of these claims. Approximately 1.36 million people—6.8 percent of the Florida's population—lost power across 39 counties, 1.2 million of whom were Florida Power & Light customers.

Effects of the Hurricane Matthew by county and sector
County / Sector	Damage	Deaths		Injuries
County / Sector	Damage	Direct	Indirect	Injuries
Brevard	$174 million	0	0	1
Broward	$8.47 million	0	0	2
Clay	$3 million	0	0	2
Duval	>$25 million	1	0	1
Flagler	$73 million	0	0	0
Indian River	$28.8 million	0	0	0
Martin	$175,000	0	0	1
Miami-Dade	$3.23 million	0	2	9
Nassau	$10 million	0	0	0
Orange	—N/a	0	1	0
Palm Beach	$22.3 million	0	0	1
Putnam	—N/a	1	0	1
St. Johns	$149.4 million	0	0	0
St. Lucie	$9.3 million	0	4	0
Volusia	$514.4 million	1	4	0
Power grid	$318.5 million	0	0	0
Unspecified	$152 million	0	0	0
Totals	$1.492 billion	3	11	16
Sources cited in text.

=== South Florida ===
==== Miami Metropolitan Area ====
Enhanced infrared satellite loop of Matthew passing east of Florida on October 7

Matthew brought tropical storm conditions to parts of Broward, Miami-Dade, Palm Beach counties resulting in scattered power outages—71,000 customers in Broward, 43,160 in Palm Beach, and 16,000 in Miami-Dade lost power—and some wind damage. Winds across the three counties peaked at 67 miles per hour (108 km/h) at Jupiter Inlet and 51 miles per hour (82 km/h) at Palm Beach International Airport. Sustained tropical storm-force winds were observed in coastal areas of Palm Beach County. Winds across interior Broward reached 40 miles per hour (64 km/h). Storefront awnings were blown down in parts of downtown West Palm Beach, and U.S. Route 1 was blocked by a downed tree in Jupiter. Damage from winds in these counties reached $2 million, of which $1.3 million occurred in Palm Beach. A total of 6,387 people in Palm Beach County and approximately 700 residents in Miami sought refuge in shelters during the storm. Peak gusts winds in the city reached 50 miles per hour (80 km/h), downing multiple trees, while sustained winds generally averaged 25 to 35 miles per hour (40 to 56 km/h). Power outages led to an accident in the Flagami neighborhood of Miami when two vehicles collided in an intersection while the traffic lights were out. Nine people were involved, including five children and a police officer, and all were hospitalized. Slick roads may have been a factor in another accident in Boca Raton that left one person injured. One person was injured in Broward while putting up hurricane shutters.

Rough seas caused moderate coastal damage and beach erosion; Singer Island and Tequesta suffered the greatest damage. The greatest inundation was observed in Lake Worth at 1.49 feet (0.45 m). On average, beaches lost 11 feet (3.4 m) of sand with Deerfield Beach and Hillsboro Beach hardest hit. Damage between the two totaled $1.9 million. Deerfield Beach International Fishing Pier experienced some damage and was temporarily closed. Approximately 800 sea turtle nests monitored by the Loggerhead Marinelife Center in Palm Beach County were lost during the storm. Severe erosion relocated up to 75 feet (23 m) of sand in Miami Beach. Ironically, beaches part of a renourishment project benefited from the storm. Damage across the three counties reached $34 million, with beach erosion in Palm Beach County accounting for $21 million. Two people died while after falling from ladders while preparing their homes for the hurricane in Miami-Dade County. Another person suffered injuries in Broward County for the same reason after the storm.

=== Gulf Coast and Panhandle ===
Onshore flow in Monroe County led to minor street flooding in Key Largo, with water rise reaching 1.5 feet (0.46 m). Tropical storm-force gusts affected several counties along the Gulf Coast, resulting in minor damage. In New Port Richey, a car was crushed by a tree; a mobile home suffered the same fate in Dade City, as did a home in Croom-A-Coochee. Effects along the western coast of Florida were limited with heavy rain and storm surge virtually non-existent; damage was estimated at $50,000.

=== Central Florida ===
Melbourne radar loop of Matthew on October 7 as the eye passed east of the Central Florida

A storm surge of 3 to 6 feet (0.91 to 1.83 m) affected coastal areas from the Indian River–St. Lucia county line to the Volusia–Flagler county line, with the highest values of 5 to 6 feet (1.5 to 1.8 m) concentrated north of Daytona Beach in Volusia. Rainfall in Seminole and Volusia counties reached 7 to 9 inches (18 to 23 cm), with accumulations of 2 to 6 inches (5.1 to 15.2 cm) in other central Florida counties, leading to minor street flooding.

During the suspension of emergency services, two people died—one from cardiac arrest—as they were either unable to reach a hospital in time or at all. Two deaths from carbon monoxide poisoning also took place in the county. Damage in St. Lucie County reached $9.3 million.

An elderly woman in Orange County died when a medical device she was wearing failed due to a power outage.

- St. Lucie county deaths
- Indian River
- Indian River building codes

==== Brevard County ====
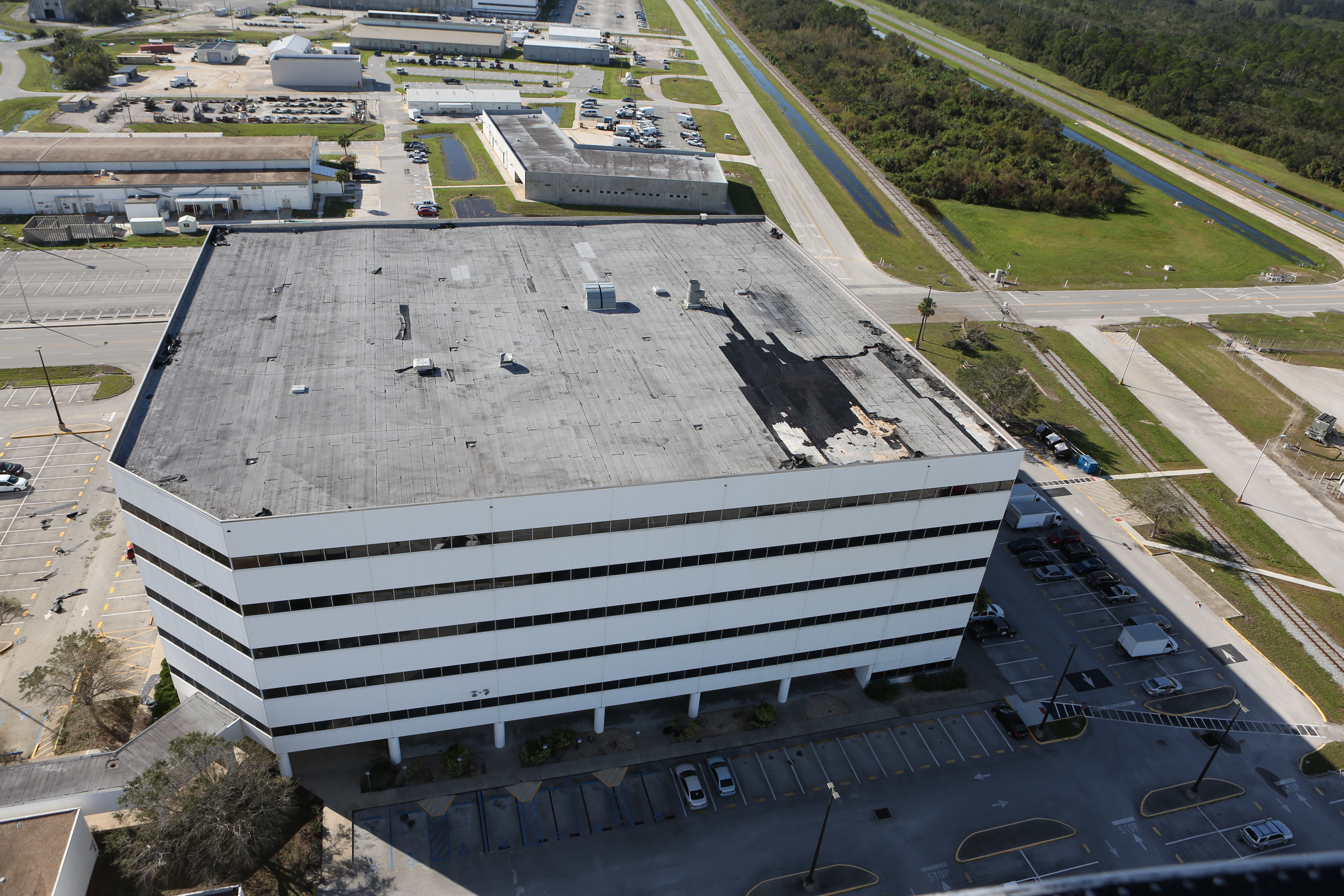

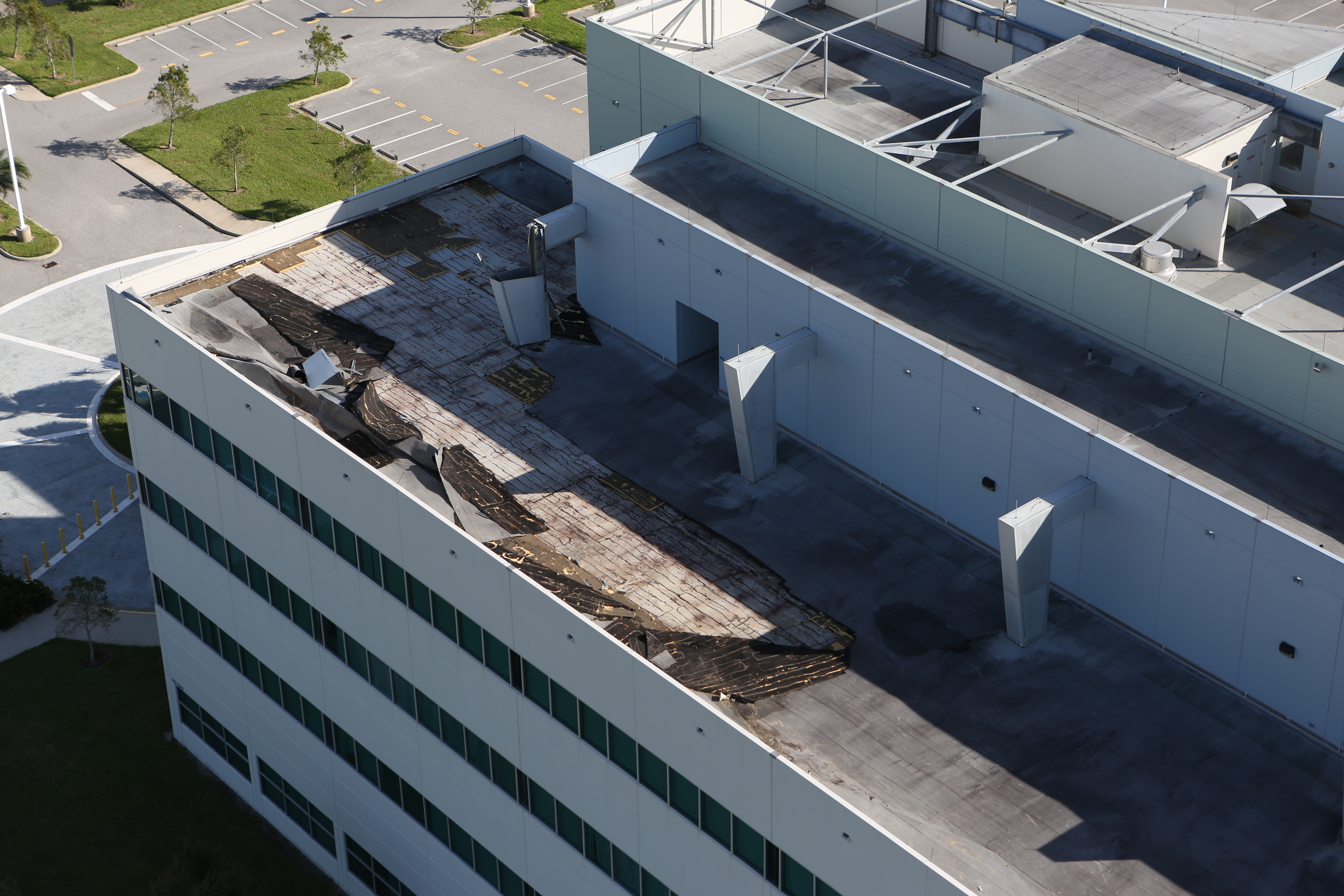
Damage to the roofs of Operations Support Building I (top) and II (bottom) at Kennedy Space Center

Hurricane Matthew made its closest approach to Florida as it paralleled Brevard County, tracking just 25 miles (40 km) to the east. This brought sustained Category 1–2-force winds (Note: No observations of sustained Category 1 or 2 winds were made along coastal Brevard County. These conditions are presumed to have occurred from Cape Canaveral northward based on post-storm assessments by the National Weather Service.) to areas along the immediate coast and hurricane-force gusts to much of the county. Sustained winds reached 53 mph (85 km/h) at Melbourne International Airport, while gusts clocked in at 87 mph (140 km/h) at Satellite Beach, 81 mph (130 km/h) at Merritt Island, and 77 mph (124 km/h) at Cocoa Beach. Hundreds of homes suffered structural damage from either the wind itself or fallen trees. Damage from wind alone was primarily confined to barrier islands and areas along large bodies of water. A total of 11 homes were destroyed, 140 experienced major damage, 549 had minor damage, and roughly 1,500 homes were otherwise affected. Downed trees and power lines caused widespread power outages, leaving 227,000 customers—75 percent of the county—without electricity at the height of the storm. One person was injured by flying debris in Port Canaveral. Storm-induced fires destroyed two homes as emergency services were suspended at the time. Storm surge and breaking waves inflicted significant damage to beachfront property, leaving behind extensive erosion and compromised foundations. Damage across the county reached $100 million: $40 million from public structures, $35 million from residential structures, and $25 million from coastal establishments and beaches.

At Kennedy Space Center, winds reached 80 mph (130 km/h) at ground level while a gust of 136 mph (219 km/h) was observed atop a 500 ft (150 m) tower. The facility suffered several million dollars' worth of damage, though overall impacts were less than anticipated. The roof of Operations Support Building II broke and rainwater damaged the interior, while piece of metal at the Vehicle Assembly Building was torn off. Air conditioning was lost throughout Launch Complex 39 as well. An orbiter access arm—used from April 1981 to July 2011—on display outside Launch Complex 39 was toppled by the storm. Similarly, a Navaho missile display at Cape Canaveral Air Force Station was knocked over. A portion of the Thor-Delta rocket, on display at the Kennedy Space Center Visitor Complex, was blown off and the famous Astronaut beach house suffered roof loss. The planned launch NOAA's next generation weather satellite, GOES-R as well as the launch of CYGNSS, a cluster of smaller satellites which study hurricanes, were delayed due to suspension of operations during Matthew. Costs to repair damage at Kennedy Space Center reached $74 million.

==== Volusia County ====
The center of Matthew tracked roughly 30 miles (48 km) offshore of Volusia, subjecting the entire county to 12 hours of sustained tropical storm-force winds. Areas along the immediate coastline likely experienced sustained hurricane-force winds based on post-storm surveys by the National Weather Service. Gusts up to 84 miles per hour (135 km/h) were recorded at Embry–Riddle University in Daytona Beach, the highest observed value in the county. A gust of 83 miles per hour (134 km/h) was also observed in New Smyrna Beach. These strong winds caused widespread damage, primarily from fallen trees, and more than 12,000 homes were directly affected. Structural damage directly from wind was largely confined to areas along the immediate coast and barrier islands, with older structures suffering far greater damage. A total of 69 homes were destroyed, 467 suffered major damage, and 1,494 experienced minor damage. The damaging winds also wreaked havoc on the power grid, leaving 258,000 customers—92 percent of the county—without electricity at the height of the storm. One woman was struck and killed by a tree in DeLand while feeding animals outside her home. Water rise and breaking waves eroded much of the protective barrier along Highway A1A in Ormond-by-the-Sea, leading to significant damage to the road itself. Onshore flow and wave-piling led to water rises of 2 to 3 feet (0.61 to 0.91 m) along the Halifax River and 1 to 2 feet (0.30 to 0.61 m) along the Mosquito Lagoon. The entire coastline of Volusia County suffered severe erosion, particularly in northern areas. Damage across Volusia County reached $514.4 million.

- Volusia local news
- Volusia

=== Northeastern Florida ===
- NWS Jacksonville

Prior to Matthew, rainfall from a nor'easter raised water levels along the St. Johns River, leading to greater flooding than would have otherwise been expected. Moderate flooding impacted portions of Putnam and St. Johns counties for nearly a week, prolonged by a seiche from continued onshore flow after Matthew passed. Heavy rainfall affected all coastal counties, with peak accumulations exceeding 10 inches (250 mm) across the St. Johns River basin. Farther inland, accumulations tapered off to 2–4 inches (51–102 mm) along the Interstate 75 corridor.

Tropical storm-force winds in Putnam County led to widespread tree and power line damage. Near Crescent City, a woman was killed when a tree crushed the camper she sought refuge in. Wind damage was primarily confined to areas in and around Palatka, and largely limited to trees and metal roofing. Storm surge in the county peaked at 3.85 ft (1.17 m) along Dunns Creek, a tributary of the St. Johns River; other nearby areas saw similar storm tides. The surge damaged or destroyed docks and stranded boats along County Road 13. Canals up to 0.25 mi (0.40 km) from the St. Johns River overflowed, leaving roadways impassible. Flooding impacted communities in Bostwick and East Palatka, with multiple homes inundated in the former town.

Effects in Baker County were relatively limited, though 20 percent of the county—2,244 customers—lost power. Forty-eight-hour rainfall accumulations reached 2.85 inches (72 mm) just south of Macclenny. Farther inland in Alachua County, wind gusts reached 48 mph (77 km/h) at Gainesville Regional Airport. Localized wind damage took place around Santa Fe College and 3,559 customers lost electricity. Neighboring Bradford County saw similar effects from strong winds; downed trees and power lines left 2,038 customers without power, primarily within Stark and Branford.

==== Flagler ====
Approximately 200 homes in the Surfside Estate mobile home park in Flagler Beach were damaged. Parts of A1A were washed away, causing closures on the road. At its peak, 60,000 customers across the county had loss power.

- NCEI report

==== Duval ====
A man in Jacksonville died when he fell off his roof while trying to repair it during the hurricane. A police officer suffered a minor cut to his leg while clearing debris; however, it subsequently became infected and the leg required amputation several weeks after the storm.

- Duval damage

==== St. Johns ====
Despite the extensive damage in St. Johns County, no loss of life nor injuries took place.

- $138.7 million damage assessment
- $149.4 million St. Johns damage
- St. Johns erosion

==== Clay ====
Roughly 21 percent of residents within the county lost power.

- NCEI report
- Clay County $3 million

==== Nassau ====
- NCEI report
- NCEI report

== Aftermath ==
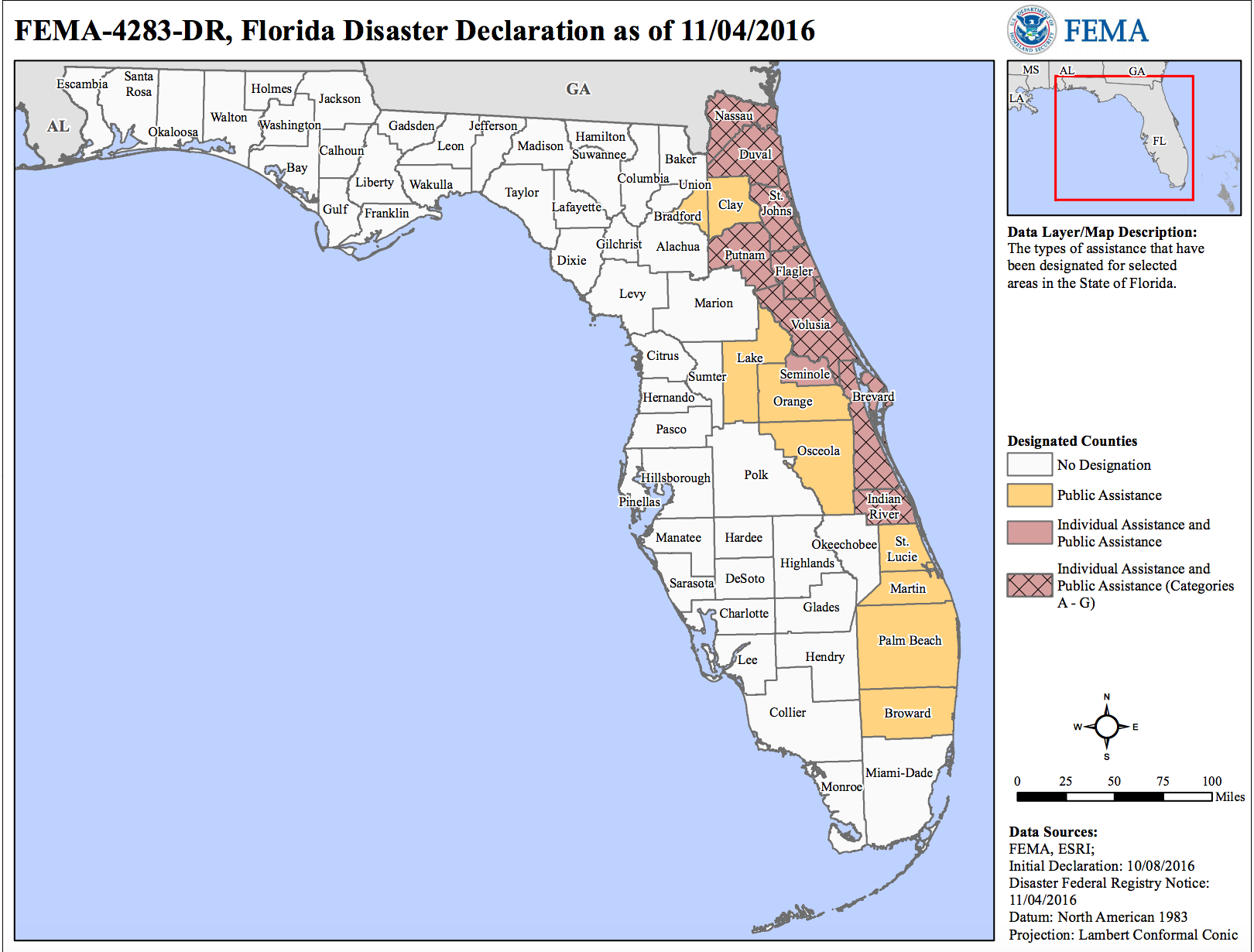
Disaster declarations across the state

Businesses reopened and emergency services resumed normal operations in and around Miami on October 7, a day earlier than expected, owing to minimal damage. FP&L workers began restoring power once gusty winds subsided. Barrier islands remained inaccessible for much of the day, however.

Four people died in the storm's aftermath across Volusia County: two by electrocution from downed power lines, one from carbon monoxide poisoning, and one from a debris removal accident. In Holly Hill, a firefighter was injured in a house fire.

- Clay County evacuation plan revision
- Homes at risk in December
- Putnam County aftermath

To pay for the $318.5 million loss sustained during the hurricane, Florida Power & Light added a surcharge of $3.36 per month to all customers using 1,000 kilowatt-hours of electricity or more from February 2017 to February 2018.

- relief funds
- Florida SitReps

Due to the severity of damage from Matthew, Florida governor Rick Scott requested on October 7 for an expedited major disaster declaration from the federal government. One day later, President Barack Obama declared a state of disaster for eight Florida counties – Brevard, Duval, Flagler, Indian River, Nassau, St. Johns, St. Lucie, and Volusia. This declaration allocated funds for debris removal and general hazard mitigation. These counties, excluding St. Lucie but also including Putnam and Seminole counties, were also made eligible for individual and public assistance, while nine other counties were eligible for public assistance. By early November 2016, nine Disaster Recovery Centers opened across Florida – in Daytona Beach, East Palatka, Fernandina Beach, Jacksonville, Palm Coast, Sanford, St. Augustine, Titusville, and Vero Beach – to help storm victims one-on-one with loans or public assistance. Homeowners had 180 days from the time of Hurricane Matthew's passage to file insurance claims with the National Flood Insurance Program. By March 2017, the Federal Emergency Management Agency (FEMA) approved 6,754 applications for individual assistance, totaling $19,936,013.23. The agency also approved of $20,665,898.05 in public assistance grants, mostly related to emergency work.

Despite ordering 8% of Florida’s population to evacuate, governor Rick Scott refused to extend the voting registration date past October 11. This led to a lawsuit from the Florida Democratic Party, claiming the Voting Rights Act of 1965, as well as the First Amendment and Fourteenth Amendment, were being violated. Ultimately, a federal judge extended the deadline to October 12 at 5 p.m.

== See also ==
- Hurricane Dorian- Another strong tropical cyclone that took a similar path to Matthew
- List of Florida hurricanes
