= Chardonnières =

Chardonnières: Chadonyè
- Commune
- Interactive map of Chardonnières
- Location in Haiti
- Coordinates: 18°16′0″N 74°10′0″W
- Country: Haiti
- Department: Sud
- Arrondissement: Chardonnières

Area
  - Total: 117.04 km^{2} (45.19 sq mi)
- Elevation: 0 m (0 ft)

Population (2015)
  - Total: 25,240
  - Density: 215.7/km^{2} (558.5/sq mi)
- Demonym: Chardonnesien(ne) (fr)
- Time zone: UTC−05:00 (EST)
  - Summer (DST): UTC−04:00 (EDT)
- Postal code: T 8510

Chardonnières (French pronunciation: [ʃaʁdɔnjɛʁ]; also Les Chardonnières; Haitian Creole: Chadonyè) is a commune in the Chardonnières Arrondissement, in the Sud department of Haiti. Chardonnière is the largest producer of grapes in Haiti. A Festival of the Grape (Festival du raisin des Chardonnières) is annually held.

== History ==
The town was originally named Chardonnières by buccaneers or filibusters. In its colonial days, grapes had reached the tables of the kings of France. Today, grapes are used by the Chardonnesiens to welcome visitors to express their generosity and hospitality.

== Geography ==
Chardonnière is located about 72 kilometers from Les Cayes, and minutes from Port-à-Piment.

== Infrastructure ==
The Catholic parish of Chardonnière was erected in 1897 and consecrated to Saint Anne.

== Settlements ==
- Bois Delai
- Bousquel
- Chardonnières
- Duplantin
