= Barry Keim =

Barry D. Keim
- Born: September 9, 1963 (age 62); Chalmette, Louisiana
- Education: University of New Orleans (B.A., 1987), Louisiana State University (M.S., 1990; Ph.D., 1994)
- Scientific career
- Fields: Climatology
- Institutions: Louisiana State University
- Thesis: Temporal and synoptic analyses of heavy rainfall in the southeastern United States (1994)

Barry David Keim (born September 9, 1963, in New Orleans, Louisiana) is a faculty member and previous Director of the Environmental Health, Climate, and Sustainability Program at the LSU-Health Sciences Center in New Orleans. He was previously the Richard J. Russell Professor in the Department of Geography & Anthropology at Louisiana State University (LSU). He served as the state climatologist for the state of Louisiana from 2002-2023. Before that he was on the faculty of the University of New Hampshire, and was the New Hampshire state climatologist, from 1994 to 2003. He is known for researching extreme weather, such as hurricanes and heavy rainfall.
