= Les Anglais =

Les Anglais Zanglè
- Commune
- Interactive map of Les Anglais
- Location in Haiti
- Coordinates: 18°18′0″N 74°13′0″W
- Country: Haiti
- Department: Sud
- Arrondissement: Chardonnières

Area
  - Total: 117.04 km^{2} (45.19 sq mi)
- Elevation: 0 m (0 ft)

Population (2015)
  - Total: 29,891
  - Density: 255.39/km^{2} (661.46/sq mi)
- Time zone: UTC−05:00 (EST)
  - Summer (DST): UTC−04:00 (EDT)
- Postal code: HT 8520

Les Anglais (French pronunciation: [lez‿ɑ̃ɡlɛ]; Haitian Creole: Zanglè), French for "The English", is a commune in the Chardonnières Arrondissement, in the Sud department of Haiti. It has 29,891 inhabitants. The eye of Hurricane Matthew made landfall near Les Anglais on 4 October 2016 at 6 a.m. EST (11:00 a.m. UTC) as a powerful Category 4 hurricane with winds of 230 km/h (145 mph).

== Settlements ==
- Boco
- Chanterelle
- Dernere Morne
- Les Anglais
- Limo
