= Chardonnières Arrondissement =

Coordinates: 18.2667°N 74.1667°W

Chardonnières Arrondissement Arrondissement des Chardonnières Awondisman Chadonyè
- Arrondissement
- Interactive map of Chardonnières Arrondissement
- Country: Haiti
- Department: Sud

Area
  - Arrondissement: 382.29 km^{2} (147.60 sq mi)
  - Urban: 5.85 km^{2} (2.26 sq mi)
  - Rural: 376.44 km^{2} (145.34 sq mi)

Population (2015)
  - Arrondissement: 78,410
  - Density: 205.1/km^{2} (531.2/sq mi)
  - Urban: 27,134
  - Rural: 51,276
- Time zone: UTC-5 (Eastern)
- Postal code: HT85—
- Communes: 3
- Communal Sections: 10
- IHSI Code: 075

Chardonnières (Haitian Creole: Chadonyè) is an arrondissement in the Sud department of Haiti. Spanning approximately 382 km^{2} (147 sq mi), it comprises three communes–Chardonnières, Les Anglais, and Tiburon. As of 2015, it had a population of 78,410 inhabitants. It stretches from the coastline of the Caribbean Sea into the Massif de la Hotte highlands. The economy is based on agriculture, livestock, fishing, and crafts. The annual Grape Festival is a popular celebration.

== Geography ==
Chardonnieres is an arrondissement in the Sud department of Haiti. The commune is located along the coast between Port-à-Piment and Les Anglais. The landscape transitions from coastal plains into elevated terrain, including the hills of Randel and the foothills of Massif de la Hotte, reaching elevations up to 817 m (2,680 ft). The region has a hot tropical climate. The region was affected during the 2021 Haiti earthquake and went through extensive rebuilding efforts.

== Demographics and economy ==
As of 2015, the population was 78,410 inhabitants. Approximately 43% of the local population is under the age of 18. Chardonnières is recognized as Haiti’s primary grape-producing region, with inhabitants traditionally cultivating grapes on domestic arbors. The annual Festival du Raisin (Grape festival) in July promotes local viticulture and cultural heritage.
