= Mitan =

Mitan may refer to:

- Mitan, Gansu, town in Jingyuan County, Gansu, China
- Mitan-myeon or Mitan Township, in Pyeongchang County, Gangwon, South Korea
- Mitan, Uzbekistan, settlement in Samarkand Region, Uzbekistan
- Mitan, Haiti, village in Arcahaie, Ouest, Haiti
