= Saintard =

- Commune
- Location in Haiti
- Coordinates: 18.8239868°N 72.5500315°W
- Country: Haiti
- Department: Ouest
- Arrondissement: Arcahaie

Area
  - Total: 11.83 km^{2} (4.57 sq mi)
- Elevation: 60 m (200 ft)

Population (2009)
  - Total: 32,906
  - Density: 2,782/km^{2} (7,204/sq mi)
- Time zone: UTC-05:00 (EST)
  - Summer (DST): UTC-04:00 (EDT)

Saintard is a town in the Arcahaie commune in the Arcahaie Arrondissement, in the Ouest department of Haiti. In 2009, the town had 32,906 inhabitants. It is the largest urban area in Arcahaie commune.

== See also ==
- Arcahaie, for a list of other settlements in the commune.
