= Saint Medard, Haiti =

Saint Medard
- Town
- Location in Haiti
- Coordinates: 18.7991187°N 72.514304°W
- Country: Haiti
- Department: Ouest
- Arrondissement: Arcahaie
- Time zone: UTC-05:00 (EST)
  - Summer (DST): UTC-04:00 (EDT)

Saint Medard is a town in the Arcahaie commune of the Arcahaie Arrondissement, in the Ouest department of Haiti. It is located 3 kilometers north of Arcahaie communal section.

== See also ==
- Arcahaie, for a list of other settlements in the commune.
