= Aubry, Haiti =

Aubry
- Village
- Location in Haiti
- Coordinates: 18.7127073°N 72.3773373°W
- Country: Haiti
- Department: Ouest
- Arrondissement: Arcahaie
- Elevation: 51 m (167 ft)

Aubry is a village in the Cabaret commune in the Arcahaie Arrondissement, in the Ouest department of Haiti.

== See also ==
- Cabaret, for a list of other settlements in the commune.
