= Lafiteau =

- Town
- Location in Haiti
- Coordinates: 18°41′32″N 72°21′14″W
- Country: Haiti
- Department: Ouest
- Arrondissement: Arcahaie
- Commune: Cabaret
- Time zone: UTC-5 (EST)

Lafiteau (French pronunciation: [lafito]), also called Carrefour Lafiteau, is a small industrial port town, about nine miles north of the capital, Port-au-Prince, in the commune of Cabaret in the Haiti. It lies to the south of Titanyen. Many supply ships entered this port in the aftermath of the 2010 Haiti earthquake as part of earthquake relief operations. The road to the port is maintained well after the earthquake, and the port and its jetties also, which suffered damage due to the earthquake, are in continuous process of refurbishing.

== Geography ==
Lafiteau, with an average elevation of 9 metres (30 ft), is 1.3 miles (2.1 km) east-southeast of Ile à Cabrit and 210 metres (690 ft) southwest of the coast. Several shoal patches are distributed less than a miles off the coast.

== Transportation ==
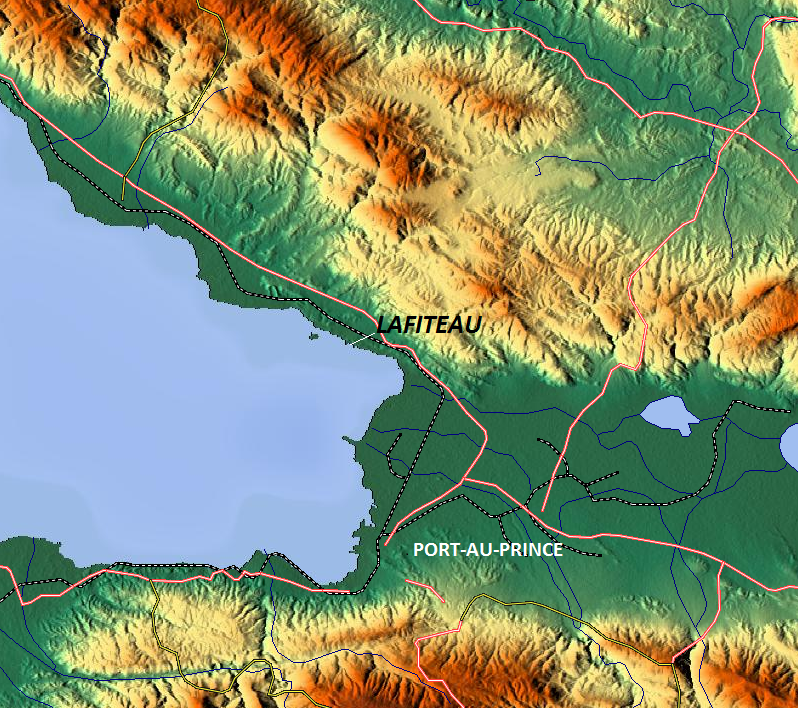
Map showing Lafiteau in relation to Port-au-Prince

The nearest airport to the port town is the Toussaint Louverture International Airport at Port-au-Prince where Insel Air, American Airways, Air Canada, Air Freight NZ, Air France, Copa, Delta, Spirit, Air Bridge Cargo provide both air cargo and passenger services.

The port is approached from the Port-au-Prince over a well maintained road, Route Nationale 1 (100).

== Economy ==
The economy of the port town is supported by notable processing plants, including the Caribbean Mills Processing Plant and the Grain Processing Plant. In 2009, Les Moulins d'Haiti, a wheat flour mill, sold more than 170,000 metric tons of wheat flour.

=== Port Lafito ===
Lafiteau is the home of the Port Lafito Industrial Free Zone, Haiti's only Panamax seaport. Quay side terminal of 130,000 square meters (13 hectares), 450 meters of berth, 12.5 meters of safe draft, Dock height is approximately 3.3 meters above mean sea level.

== Jobs ==
The construction of the Port Lafito and of a free zone, located 25 minutes from Port-au-Prince, at a cost of US$150 million, is part of the "Lafito Global" project initiated by Gilbert Bigio's GB Group, in partnership with the Haitian government and several other Haitian private sector entrepreneurs to create jobs and stimulate the local economy. Over 20,000 jobs will be created within the next four years.

== Healthcare ==
The Hospital Centre of the Haitian Academy is located in Lafiteau. In October 2010, news reports stated there were two cholera-related deaths in Lafiteau.

== Mass graves ==
Victims of the Haiti presidents "Papa Doc" Duvaliers and "Baby Doc" Duvalier were buried in mass graves in Lafiteau, as were 100,000 of the 2010 Haiti earthquake victims.
