= André, Haiti =

André
- Rural settlement
- Location in Haiti
- Coordinates: 18.9356364°N 72.56649°W
- Country: Haiti
- Department: Ouest
- Arrondissement: Arcahaie
- Elevation: 1,207 m (3,960 ft)
- Time zone: UTC-05:00 (EST)
  - Summer (DST): UTC-04:00 (EDT)

André (French pronunciation: [ɑ̃dʁe]) is a rural settlement in the Arcahaie commune in the Ouest department of Haiti.

== See also ==
- Arcahaie, for a list of other settlements in the commune.
