= Grois Morne =

Doco 2 Haïti Doco 2 Haïti
- Village
- Location in Haiti
- Coordinates: 18.8239868°N 72.5500315°W
- Country: Haiti
- Department: Ouest
- Arrondissement: 7ème section Arcahaie
- Elevation: 784 m (2,572 ft)
- Time zone: UTC-05:00 (EST)
  - Summer (DST): UTC-04:00 (EDT)

Doco2 is a village in the 7ème section of Arcahaie commune in the Arcahaie Arrondissement, in the Ouest.

== See also ==
- Arcahaie, for a list of other settlements in the commune.
