= Guldy Garret =

- Village
- Location in Haiti
- Coordinates: 18.7196773°N 72.4268921°W
- Country: Haiti
- Department: Ouest
- Arrondissement: Arcahaie
- Elevation: 17 m (56 ft)

Guldy Garret is a village in the Cabaret commune in the Arcahaie Arrondissement, in the Ouest department of Haiti.

== See also ==
- Cabaret, for a list of other settlements in the commune.
