= Ezili Dantor =

Loa in Haitian Vodou

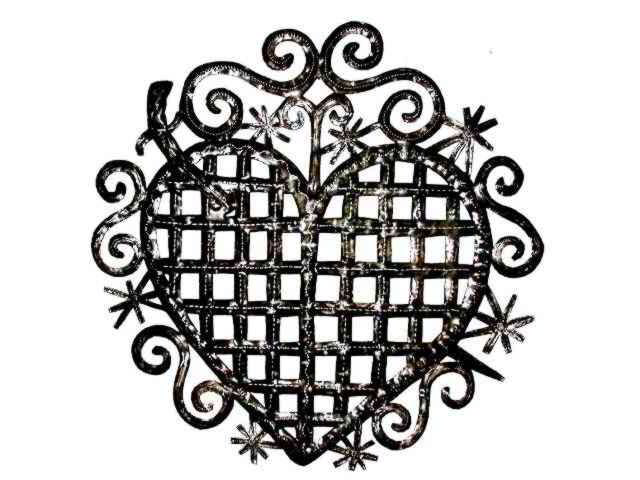
Metalwork reproducing Èzili Dantò's vèvè

Èzili Dantò (Haitian Creole pronunciation: [ɛzili dãtɔ]) or Erzulie Dantor is the main loa (or lwa) or senior spirit of the Petro family in Haitian Vodou. Ezili Danto, or Èzili Dantò, is the "manifestation of Erzulie, the divinity of love." It is said that Ezili Danto has a dark complexion and is maternal in nature. The Ezili are feminine spirits in Haitian Vodou that personify womanhood. The Erzulie is a goddess, spirit, or loa of love in Haitian Voudou. She has several manifestations or incarnations, but most prominent and well-known manifestations are La Sirene (the mermaid), Erzulie Freda, and Erzulie Dantor. There are spelling variations of Erzulie, the other being Ezili. They are English interpretations of a Creole word, but do not differ in meaning.

== Worship ==
Tuesdays are the days reserved to worship Ezili Dantor. Worship is normally done in solitary in front of an altar identified by the colors blue, black and red. The most recurrent offering consist of crème de cacao, jewels, golden rings and florida water. For her birthday a wild pig is normally the main sacrifice.

== Haitian mythology ==
In Haitian mythology, there are multiple spiritual entities, or lwa, that work between the mortal world and the divine world. Ezili are feminine spirits that personify different aspects of womanhood. Ezili Freda is a Rada Loa who represents romantic love and erotic sexuality, while Ezili Dantor is Petro and represents the hardworking and sometimes angry mother, although she is also known to take on lovers of her own. Ezili Dantor is believed to have children of her own in some stories, such as Ti-Jean Petwo, and is a fervid protector of the youth and the marginalized.

Ezilí Freda is Dantor's rival and is said to be responsible for leaving scars on Dantor's cheek – known as twa màk– during a fight over the love of Ogou, according to some legends. Another distinction between them is that Freda is traditionally light-skinned (though this has begun to shift in devotional art) and relatively wealthy, indicative of her status as an upper-class woman. Thus, Ezili Dantor strongly resonates with lower class women in Haitian society. People may often petition her to help them get work. Ezili Dantor is also associated with the masisi, transgender women and effeminate men.

Other stories in the religion note that Èzili Dantò is nonspeaking as a result of her tongue being cut out by other Haitian Revolutionaries who feared she would betray them. Èzili Dantò only utters syllables during possession because of this, and is capable of becoming extremely angry and vengeful, to the point that she is considered evil, though she is not inherently so. Other adherents believe she does not speak because she is too angry and exhausted to do so from having to work hard and gaining so little. Her daughter, Anais, often interprets for her, and may be contacted to pass on messages.

Dantor's anger has the power to destroy, and her vehement displeasure has earned her the reputation of being the red eyed, "Èzili Je Wouj". Her destructive powers often come in the form of natural disasters and the forces of nature. Her rage is even said to be able to afflict those who anger her with extremely painful illnesses. Ezili Je Wouj is also sometimes considered a separate figure. In Zora Neale Hurston’s Haiti and Their Eyes Were Watching God, Ezili's Danto's rage is described as "violent reminder to the folk that their passive faith in Euro-Americans, or Christianity, to determine their fate is misguided."

Ultimately, Ezili Dantor "rages and destroys, but she also suffers", known to be associated with fertility problems women experience, including aphasia. However, at heart, Ezili Dantor is a devoted and selfless mother, willing to do all that is possible to protect those she loves and cares for, even "turn the world upside down". Those who venerate Dantor are expected to serve her with the same undying loyalty in return, as well as caution.

== Dantor and the Haitian Revolution ==
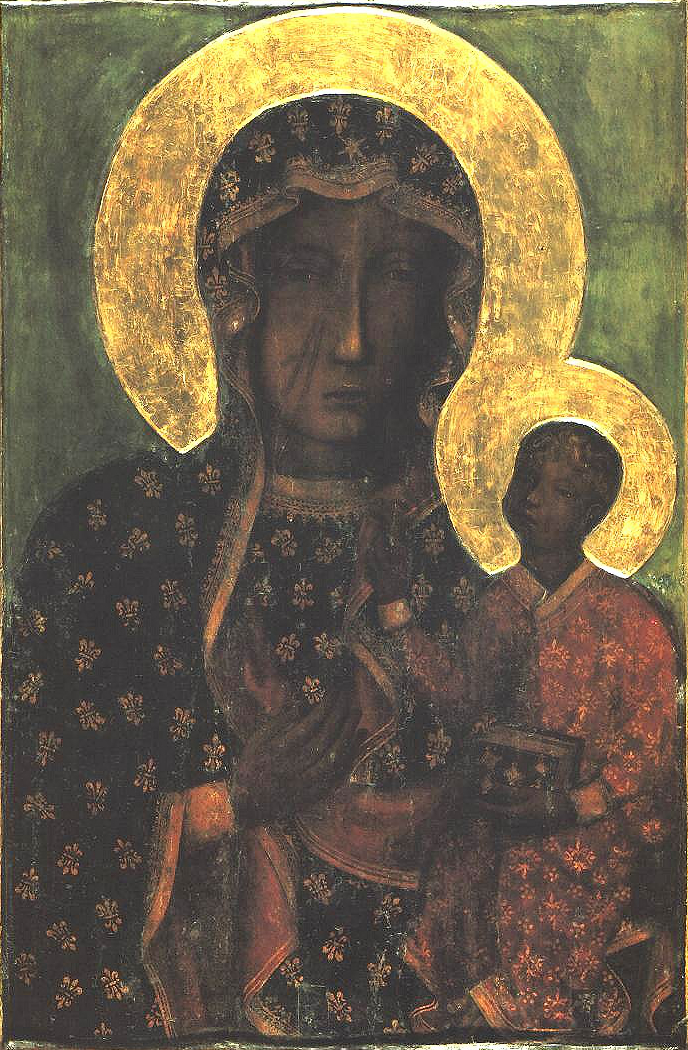
Black Madonna of Częstochowa

It is accounted that the slave revolt of 1791 started with a pact which followed a big feast in honour to Ezili Dantor. For this reason she is considered the national Lwa. Considered to be a fearless warrior in the Petro Nation (Petwo Nanchon in Haitian Creole), Dantor has been popular among single mothers during the 1980s and 1990s in Haiti and Dominican Republic.

Syncretic modern representations of Dantor sometimes associate her with the Mater Salvatoris, especially those depicted with children; Our Lady of Lourdes and Our Lady of Mount Carmel as examples. The most common association however, is the Black Madonna of Częstochowa, the patron saint of Poland.

The original association of Ezili Dantor with the Black Madonna of Częstochowa is hypothesized to be from copies of the icon brought to Haiti by Polish soldiers sent by order of Napoleon Bonaparte, to subdue the then still ongoing Haitian Revolution. It is accounted that the Polish legion saw the struggle of the Polish nation during the Partitions of Poland in the struggle of the Haitian slaves in fights for their freedom, and as a result the Polish soldiers eventually turned on the French army to join the Haitian slaves. As a consequence of this action, during Jean-Jacques Dessalines's 1804 massacre, which took place shortly after the Haitian victory, the Poles were left alive and granted citizenship of the newly-founded Republic of Haiti. The descendants of these soldiers are still living in the island, specifically in the locality of Cazale.

== References in popular culture ==
=== Books ===
- The 2013 novel Zora Neale Hurston, Haiti, and Their Eyes Were Watching God is a collection of ten essays from various authors that break down and analyze the literary work of Zora Neale Hurston, and her 1937 novel Their Eyes Were Watching God. Hurston's stories follow a light-skinned woman by the name of Janie Crawford. Hurston writes the character of Janie with characteristics that resemble Ezili Freda, but that both Freda and Danto live within her. Janie falls in love with and marries a dark-skinned man named Tea Cake but must show him that she is not above working in the fields like other working-class folk. By working in the fields, Janie shows that she is not afraid of hard work, is mature, and embraces Ezili Danto.
- In the Mambo Reina Series by Veronica G. Henry, the main character is a Mambo who is dedicated to Erzulie.

=== Music ===
- Paul Beaubrun performed a song dedicated to Ezili on his album Ayibobo.
- "Ezili" – (from the album "Potomitan") is a song written by Sélène Saint-Aimé a French-Caribbean contrabass player, vocalist and poet.
- Don_Cerati released the single "Dantor" dedicated to Ezili in 2023.

== See also ==
- Erzulie
