= Thomas, Haiti =

Thomas
- Village
- Location in Haiti
- Coordinates: 18.7692783°N 72.4899372°W
- Country: Haiti
- Department: Ouest
- Arrondissement: Arcahaie
- Elevation: 9 m (30 ft)

Thomas is a village in the Cabaret in the Arcahaie Arrondissement, in the Ouest department of Haiti.

== See also ==
- Cabaret, for a list of other settlements in the commune.
