= Honoré Tournély =

French Catholic theologian

Honoré Tournély (28 August 1658 – 26 December 1729) was a French Catholic theologian. He was a Gallican opponent of Jansenism.

== Life ==
He was born in Antibes, Provence, to poor and obscure parents. An uncle, a priest at Paris, invited him there and gave him a good education. On completing his philosophical and theological studies, he became a doctor of the Sorbonne in 1686, and two years later was sent by the king to the University of Douai to teach theology. Here, he distinguished himself by his lectures and by his opposition of the Jansenists. He was even accused of forgeries in order to compromise them, but the proofs of this accusation have never been forthcoming.

Four years later he was recalled to Paris, appointed professor of theology at the Sorbonne, made a canon of the Sainte-Chapelle, and given the Abbey of Plainpied (Diocese of Bourges). He taught with unvarying success for twenty-four years, and at Douai showed himself the determined opponent of the Jansenists. In return they published pamphlets and multiplied attacks to discredit him and his teaching, especially after the publication of the Constitution Unigenitus, in which Pope Clement XI condemned (1713) their errors as manifested in the Reflections morales of Quesnel.

Tournély was actively engaged in furthering the acceptance of this Constitution by the assembly of the French clergy, of which he was a consultor, and by the faculty of theology of which he was an influential member. When, after the death of Louis XIV (1715) and after the connivance of Cardinal Noailles, the Jansenists became masters of the faculty of theology, they expunged from its registers the Bull "Unigenitus" and expelled from its meetings Tournély and a score of his friends among the doctors (January 1716). It was only at the earnest intervention of the regent, the Duke of Orléans, that they were reinstated five years later (February 1721). Tournély died at Paris.

== Works ==
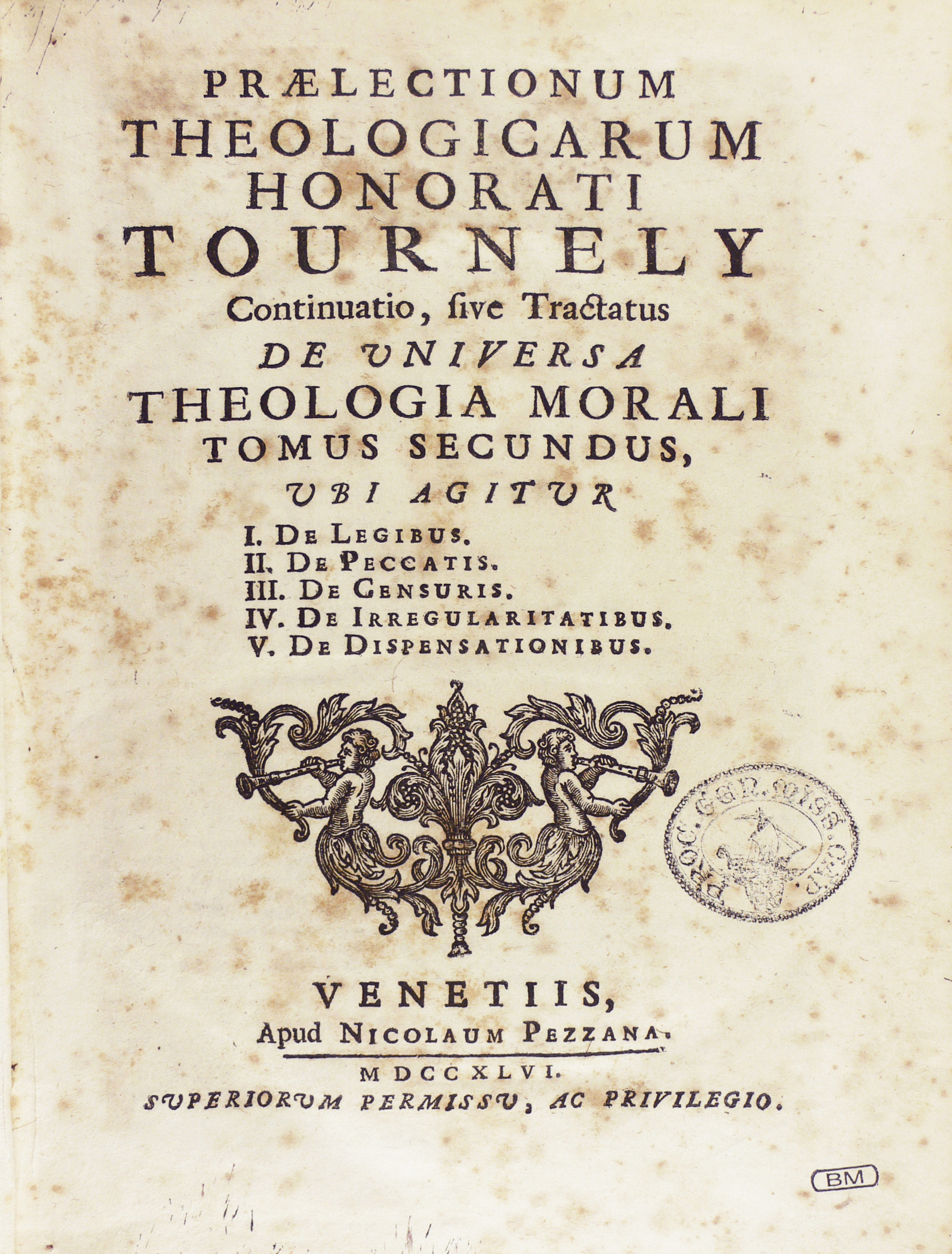
Praelectionum theologicarum, 1746.

Tournély had so far published nothing, at least in his own name, but he is regarded as the author or inspirer of several anonymous works against the Jansenists which appeared at that time. On his retirement he immediately began to revise his lectures and, at the request of Cardinal de Fleury and others, to publish them in 1725. With the common title "Præ Theologicæ", he issued in Latin the following treatises in octavo:

- "On God and His Attributes" (1725);
- "On grace" (1726);
- "On the Trinity" (1726);
- "On the Church" (1726);
- "On the Sacraments in general" (1727);
- "On the Incarnation" (1727);
- "On the Sacraments of Baptism and Confirmation" (1727);
- "On Penance and Extreme Unction" (1728);
- "On the Eucharist" (1729);
- "On Holy Orders" (1729);
- "On Marriage" (1730).

The work passed through several editions, among others those of Paris (16 vols., in 8 vo, 1731–46), Cologne (10 vols., in fol., 1752–65). Several of these treatises were abridged for use in seminaries, still appear in Tournély's name, but they were in reality the work of Montagne, Robinet, and Collet.

Tournély's own work is still so important in extent and value that he may be regarded as one of the most notable theologians of his age. The learned Lafiteau, Bishop of Sisteron, even then declared him "one of the greatest men who has ever been in the Sorbonne", and his works were highly esteemed by Alphonsus Liguori. His chief characteristics are clearness of explanation, elegance of style, learning and orthodoxy.
