= Dasse, Haiti =

Dasse
- Village
- Location in Haiti
- Coordinates: 18.8086678°N 72.5575602°W
- Country: Haiti
- Department: Ouest
- Arrondissement: Arcahaie
- Elevation: 20 m (66 ft)
- Time zone: UTC-05:00 (EST)
  - Summer (DST): UTC-04:00 (EDT)

Dasse (French pronunciation: [das]) is a village in the Arcahaie commune in the Arcahaie Arrondissement, in the Ouest department of Haiti.

== See also ==
- Arcahaie, for a list of other settlements in the commune.
