= Bélac =

- Village
- Location in Haiti
- Coordinates: 18.8157013°N 72.3340304°W
- Country: Haiti
- Department: Ouest
- Arrondissement: Arcahaie
- Elevation: 1,023 m (3,356 ft)

Bélac is a village in the Cabaret commune in the Arcahaie Arrondissement, in the Ouest department of Haiti.

== See also ==
- Cabaret, for a list of other settlements in the commune.
