= Sophie, Haiti =

Sophie
- Village
- Location in Haiti
- Coordinates: 18.746899°N 72.4006879°W
- Country: Haiti
- Department: Ouest
- Arrondissement: Arcahaie
- Elevation: 89 m (292 ft)

Sophie is a village in the Cabaret commune in the Arcahaie Arrondissement, in the Ouest department of Haiti.

== See also ==
- Cabaret, for a list of other settlements in the commune.
