= Passe =

Passe may refer to:

- Passe, Angola, a commune in Angola
- Passe, Ouest, a village in Haiti
- Passe language, an extinct language of South America
- Passé, an English adjective meaning "outdated"
- Loel Passe (1917–1997), American sports announcer

== See also ==
- La Passe FC, a football club of the Seychelles
- Passe-passe, a 2008 French film
- Zec des Passes, a protected area in Canada
- Passee, a municipality in Germany
- Pase (disambiguation)
