= Marotte (disambiguation) =

A marotte is a prop stick used by jesters.

Marotte may also refer to:

== People ==
- Carl Marotte (born 1959), Canadian actor
- Gilles Marotte (1945–2005), Canadian hockey player
- Ginette Marotte, Canadian politician
- Maxime Marotte (born 1986), French mountain bike racer

== Other uses ==
- Marotte, Ouest, Haiti
- Nosy Mangabe, Madagascar
