= Grande Place =

- Rural settlement
- Location in Haiti
- Coordinates: 18.91689872°N 72.4645309°W
- Country: Haiti
- Department: Ouest
- Arrondissement: Arcahaie
- Elevation: 1,186 m (3,891 ft)
- Time zone: UTC-05:00 (EST)
  - Summer (DST): UTC-04:00 (EDT)

Grande Place (French pronunciation: [ɡʁɑ̃d plas]) is a rural settlement in the Arcahaie commune in the Arcahaie Arrondissement, in the Ouest department of Haiti.

== See also ==
- Arcahaie, for a list of other settlements in the commune.
