= Hurricane Ike =

Category 4 Atlantic hurricane in 2008

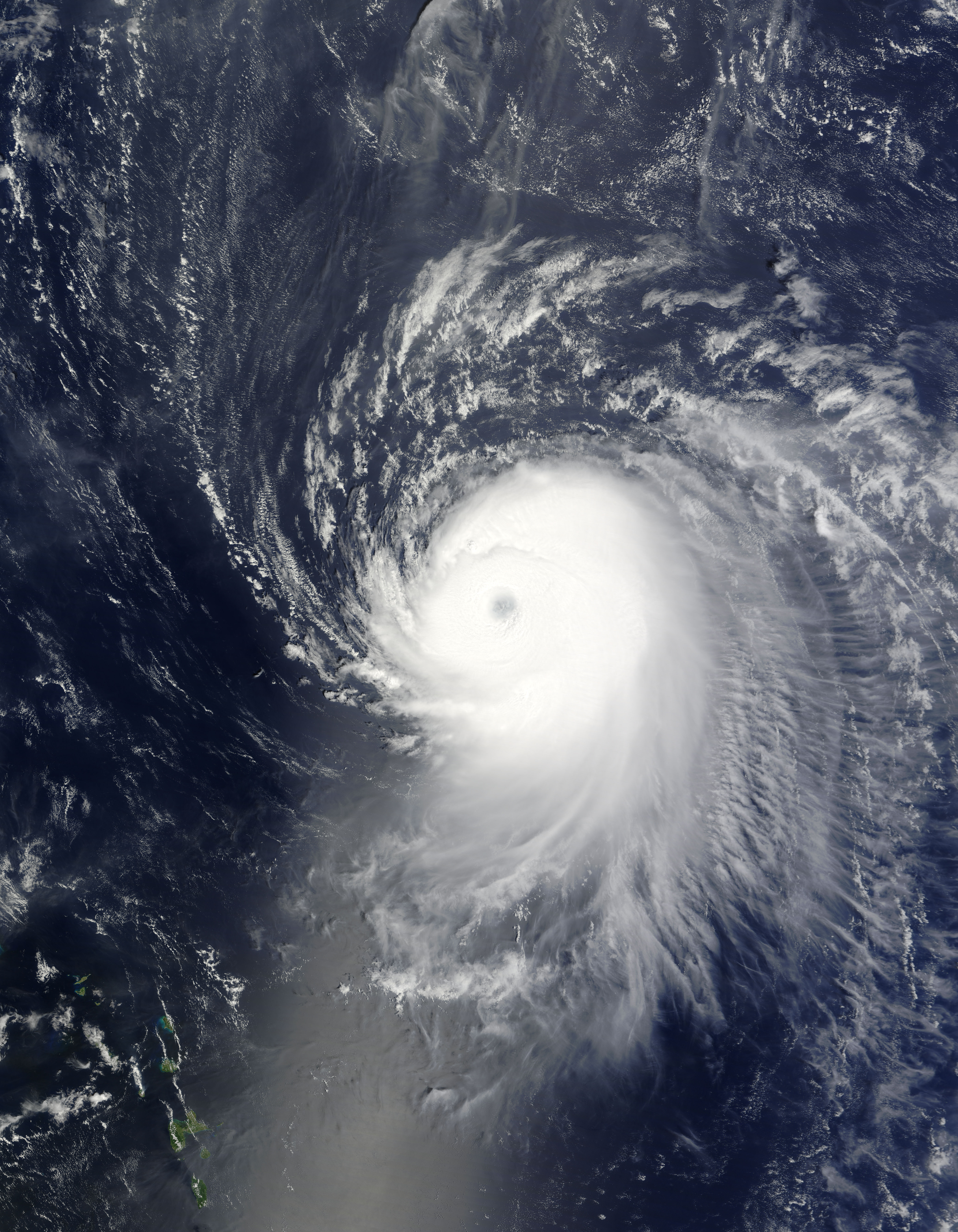
- Ike near peak intensity, northeast of the Leeward Islands on September 4

Meteorological history
- Formed: September 1, 2008
- Extratropical: September 14, 2008
- Dissipated: September 15, 2008

Category 4 major hurricane
- 1-minute sustained (SSHWS/NWS)
- Highest winds: 145 mph (230 km/h)
- Lowest pressure: 935 mbar (hPa); 27.61 inHg

Overall effects
- Fatalities: 214
- Damage: $38 billion (2008 USD)
- Areas affected: Lucayan Archipelago; Hispaniola; Cuba; Cayman Islands; Texas; South Central United States; Great Lakes region; Canada
- IBTrACS
- Part of the 2008 Atlantic hurricane season

Hurricane Ike (/aɪk/) was a long-lived, powerful and destructive tropical cyclone that swept through portions of the Greater Antilles and Northern America in September 2008, wreaking havoc on infrastructure and agriculture, particularly in Cuba and Texas. Ike took a similar track to the 1900 Galveston hurricane. The ninth tropical storm, fifth hurricane, and third major hurricane of the 2008 Atlantic hurricane season, Ike developed from a tropical wave west of Cape Verde on September 1 (Note: For consistency, Coordinated Universal Time (UTC) is used for all references of time as the cyclone existed in multiple time zones throughout its existence.) and strengthened to peak intensity as a Category 4 hurricane over the open waters of the central Atlantic on September 4 as it tracked westward. Several fluctuations in strength occurred before Ike made landfall on eastern Cuba on September 8. The hurricane weakened prior to continuing into the Gulf of Mexico, but increased its intensity by the time of its final landfall in Galveston, Texas, on September 13 before becoming an extratropical storm on September 14. The remnants of Ike continued to track across the United States and into Canada, causing considerable damage inland, before dissipating on the next day.

Ike was blamed for at least 195 deaths. Of these deaths, 74 were in Haiti, which was already trying to recover from the impact of three storms (Fay, Gustav, and Hanna) that had made landfall the same year. Seven people were killed in Cuba. In the United States, 113 people were reported killed, directly or indirectly, and 16 were still missing as of August 2011. Due to its immense size, Ike caused devastation from the Louisiana coastline all the way to the Kenedy County region near Corpus Christi, Texas. In addition, Ike caused flooding and significant damage along the Mississippi coastline and the Florida Panhandle. Damages from Ike in U.S. coastal and inland areas are estimated at $30 billion (2008 USD), with additional damage of $7.3 billion in Cuba, $200 million in the Bahamas, and $500 million in the Turks and Caicos, amounting to a total of at least $38 billion in damage. At the time, the hurricane was the second-costliest in United States history. The search-and-rescue operation after Ike was the largest search-and-rescue operation in Texas history.

Ike was the last hurricane to make landfall in the United States until Hurricane Irene three years later.

== Meteorological history ==
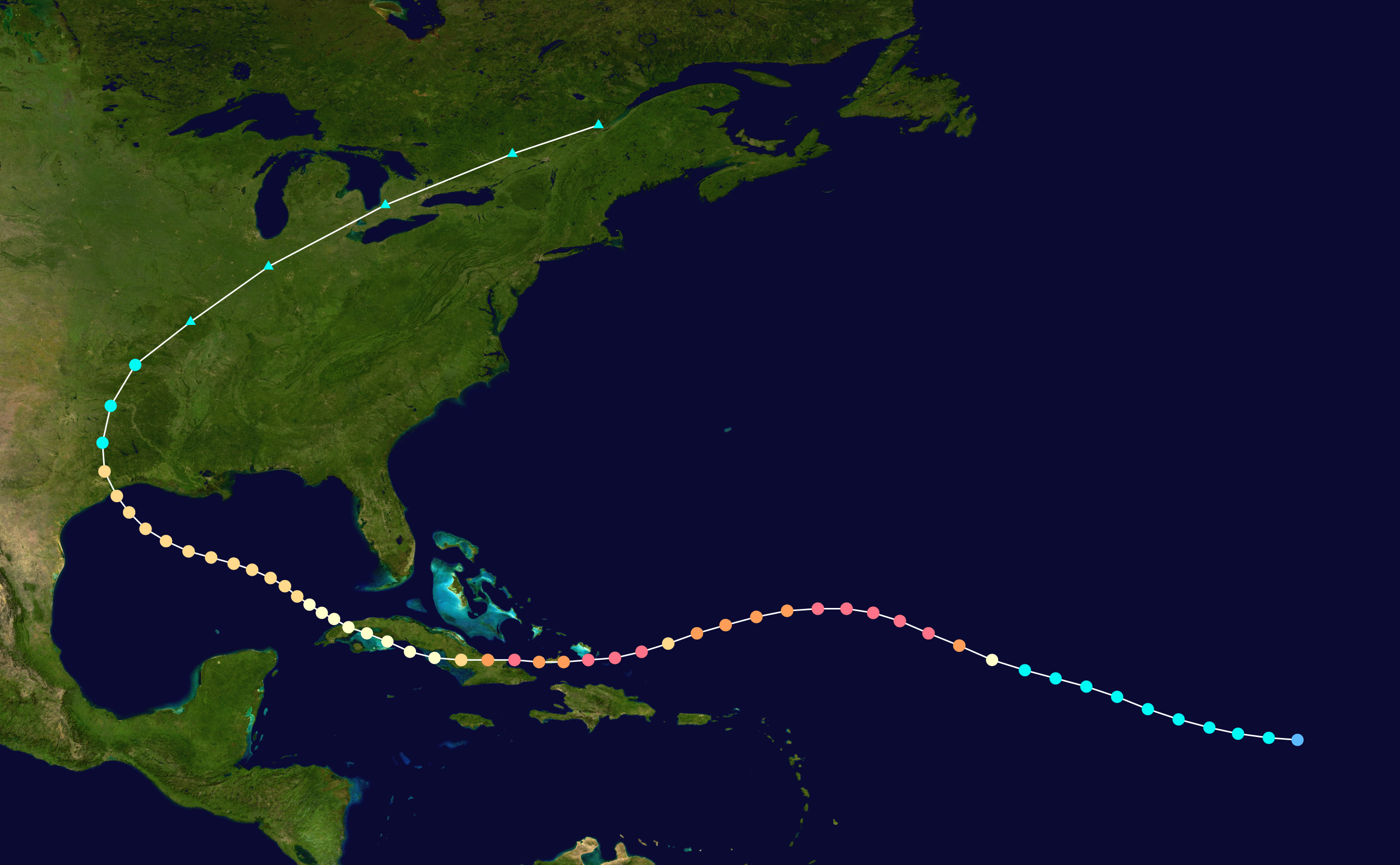
Map plotting the storm's track and intensity, according to the Saffir–Simpson scale Map key Saffir–Simpson scale Tropical depression (≤38 mph, ≤62 km/h) Tropical storm (39–73 mph, 63–118 km/h) Category 1 (74–95 mph, 119–153 km/h) Category 2 (96–110 mph, 154–177 km/h) Category 3 (111–129 mph, 178–208 km/h) Category 4 (130–156 mph, 209–251 km/h) Category 5 (≥157 mph, ≥252 km/h) Unknown Storm type Tropical cyclone Subtropical cyclone Extratropical cyclone, remnant low, tropical disturbance, or monsoon depression

The origins of Hurricane Ike can be traced back to a well-defined tropical wave, first identified by the National Hurricane Center (NHC) just within the western coast of Africa on August 28. Despite the development of a low-pressure area associated with the wave and signs of organization within favorable conditions near the Cape Verde Islands, the system was only able to generate intermittent thunderstorm activity. The broad low-pressure continued to track westward and was considered to have become sufficiently organized to be classified as a tropical depression at 06:00 UTC on September 1. By this time the cyclone had tracked 780 miles (1,260 kilometers) west of Cape Verde. Although post-analysis indicated that the depression reached tropical storm strength at 12:00 UTC that day, operationally the NHC began issuing advisories on Ike three hours later, by which time the system had already gained numerous curved rainbands and well-established outflow. Over the next few hours, Ike developed additional rainbands, but failed to develop a centralized area of convection due to the presence of dry air to the storm's south and its location in an area with only marginally favorable sea surface temperatures. These factors were also responsible for Ike's slow developmental trend that began after formation.

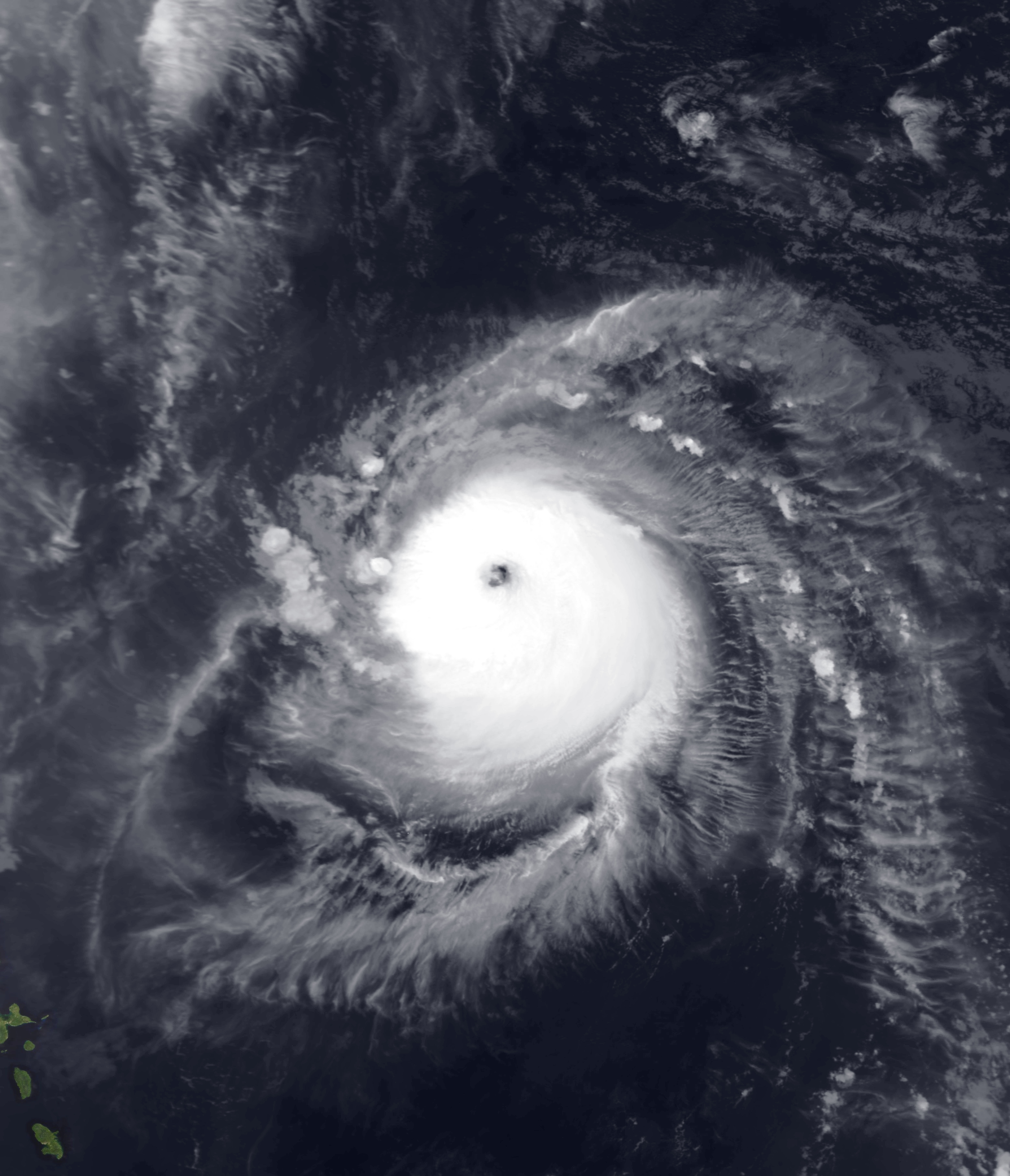
Hurricane Ike at its peak intensity on September 4

Ike's gradual strengthening began to quicken early on September 3, with the strengthening of an intense rainband around the center of the storm. At roughly 15:00 UTC that day, microwave imaging indicated that a primordial eye was developing within the intensifying tropical storm. Tracking northwestward, the NHC upgraded Ike to hurricane status at 18:00 UTC based on objective satellite intensity estimates and the appearance of the eye on visible satellite imagery. During this time, Ike was centered 690 mi (1,110 km) east-northeast of the Leeward Islands and was tracking west-northwestward as a result of a weakened subtropical ridge to its northeast. Ike's placement in an area with virtually no wind shear allowed for the hurricane to undergo explosive intensification despite unfavorable upper-level winds to its north, reaching major hurricane strength six hours after its designation as a hurricane. At 06:00 UTC on September 4, Ike peaked with maximum sustained winds of 145 miles per hour (233 kilometers per hour) and a minimum barometric pressure of 935 millibars (27.6 inches of mercury), making the storm a Category 4 on the Saffir–Simpson hurricane wind scale. After peaking in strength, a ridge of high pressure to the storm's west strengthened, causing Ike to track towards the southwest—a path unusual for the time of year. However, this track also brought the storm into an area of strong wind shear, causing the storm to become asymmetric in structure late on September 4 and weaken, briefly dropping below major hurricane status on September 6 while 150 miles (240 km) east of Grand Turk Island. Although wind shear abated and allowed for reintensification, Ike would fluctuate in strength over the next few days. After passing near the Turks and Caicos Islands, Ike made its first landfall on Inagua in the Bahamas at 13:00 UTC on September 7 with winds of 125 mph (201 km/h).

After passing over Inagua, the development of a double eyewall—a feature that usually denotes the beginning of an eyewall replacement cycle—slightly weakened Ike late on September 7. However, the hurricane was able to reintensify and reach Category 4 intensity for a final time before making landfall near Cabo Lucrecia on the coast of Holguín Province in Cuba by 00:00 UTC the next day. Although Ike remained well-defined for most of its crossing of eastern Cuba, the hurricane's core had become disrupted by the time it had reached the Caribbean Sea after spending a few hours over land. Over the next day, Ike tracked westward, paralleling the southern coast of Cuba without much intensification; at times the center of the hurricane was within 12 mi (19 km) of the island. At around 14:00 UTC on September 9, Ike made a second Cuban landfall, this time on Punta La Capitana in Pinar del Rio, with winds of 80 mph (130 km/h). Roughly six hours later, the hurricane emerged into the Gulf of Mexico as a slightly weakened system.

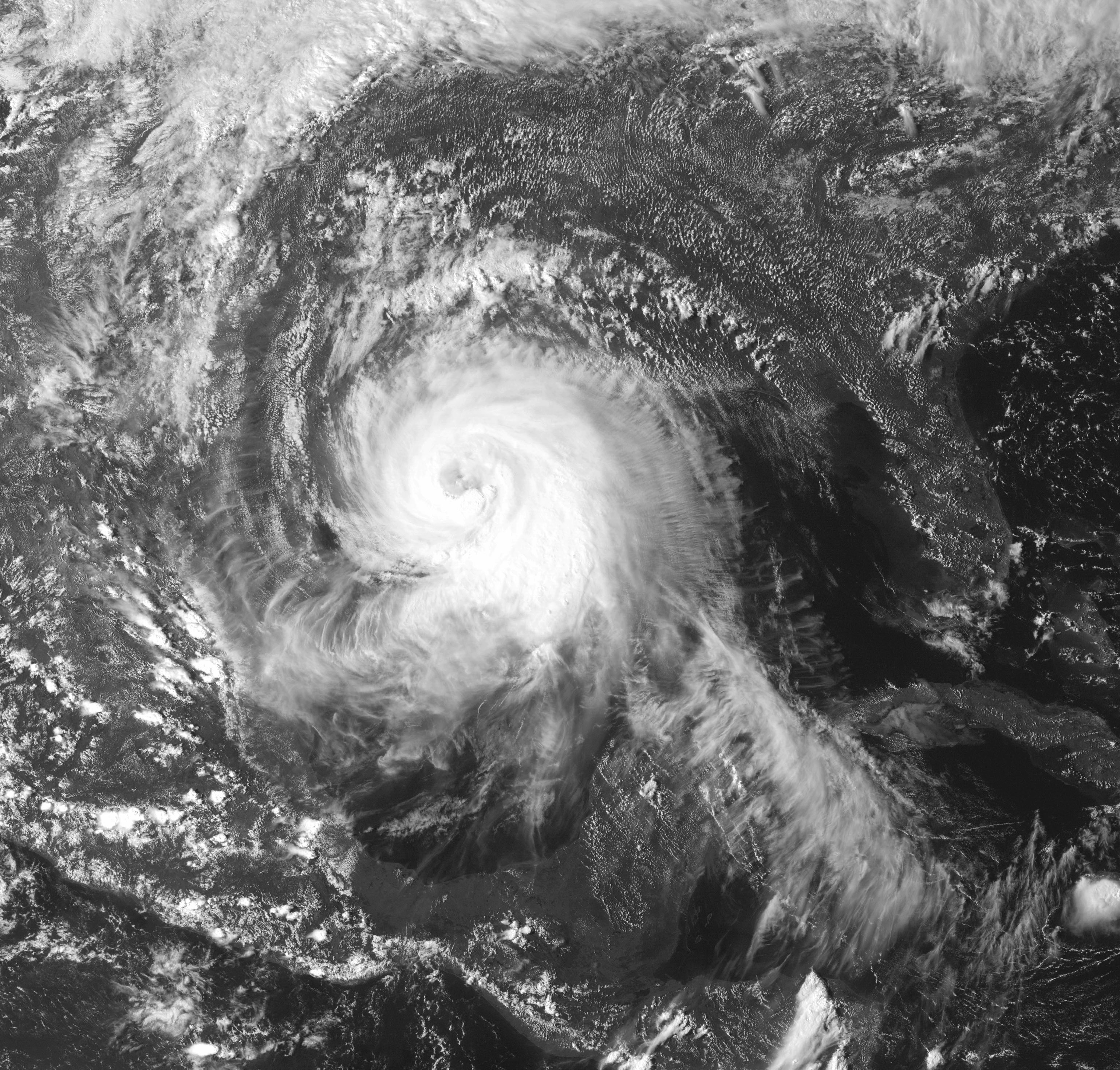
Hurricane Ike approaching Texas on September 12

Despite tracking back over water, Ike's prolonged interaction with Cuba had greatly disrupted the system's core, and instead of quickly strengthening and coalescing, the storm's wind field instead grew and only gradual intensification ensued. Due to the storm's comparatively small inner core and intensity of the outer rainbands, an eyewall replacement cycle took place, preventing Ike from rapidly intensifying. At around the same time, a high-pressure area strengthened to the hurricane's north, steering the cyclone further west than initially anticipated. Moving over the warm waters of the Loop Current, Ike reached a secondary minimum in barometric pressure on 00:00 UTC with an estimate of 944 mbar (27.9 inHg); though winds would continue to strengthen afterward, the storm's pressure would rise. By late on September 12, Ike had reached the western edge of the nearby high-pressure area and began to curve northward. The formation of an eye just prior to landfall resulted in a slight increase in winds, and at 0700 UTC on September 13, Ike made landfall on the northeast end of Galveston Island in Texas, with a minimum barometric pressure of 950 mbar (28 inHg) and sustained winds of 110 mph (180 km/h), making Ike a Category 2 hurricane. After tracking inland, Ike weakened as it sped northward and later northeastward, weakening to tropical storm status east of Palestine, Texas late on September 13 and later becoming a powerful extratropical cyclone on September 14 over the Ozarks. A more steady weakening phase ensued, and after tracking across southern Ontario and Quebec, the remnants of Ike were absorbed by another extratropical low near the St. Lawrence River, on September 15.

== Preparations ==
=== Lucayan Archipelago ===
Fearing a repeat of Hurricane Donna in 1960, the overseas branch of the British Red Cross began preparing contingency plans for 2,000 families considered to be at risk from Ike. A group of 260 Chinese construction workers stuck on Middle Caicos after the passage of Hurricane Hanna were evacuated by the British Red Cross. Immediately before the storm struck, 348 people on Grand Turk were put into emergency shelters.

=== Florida ===
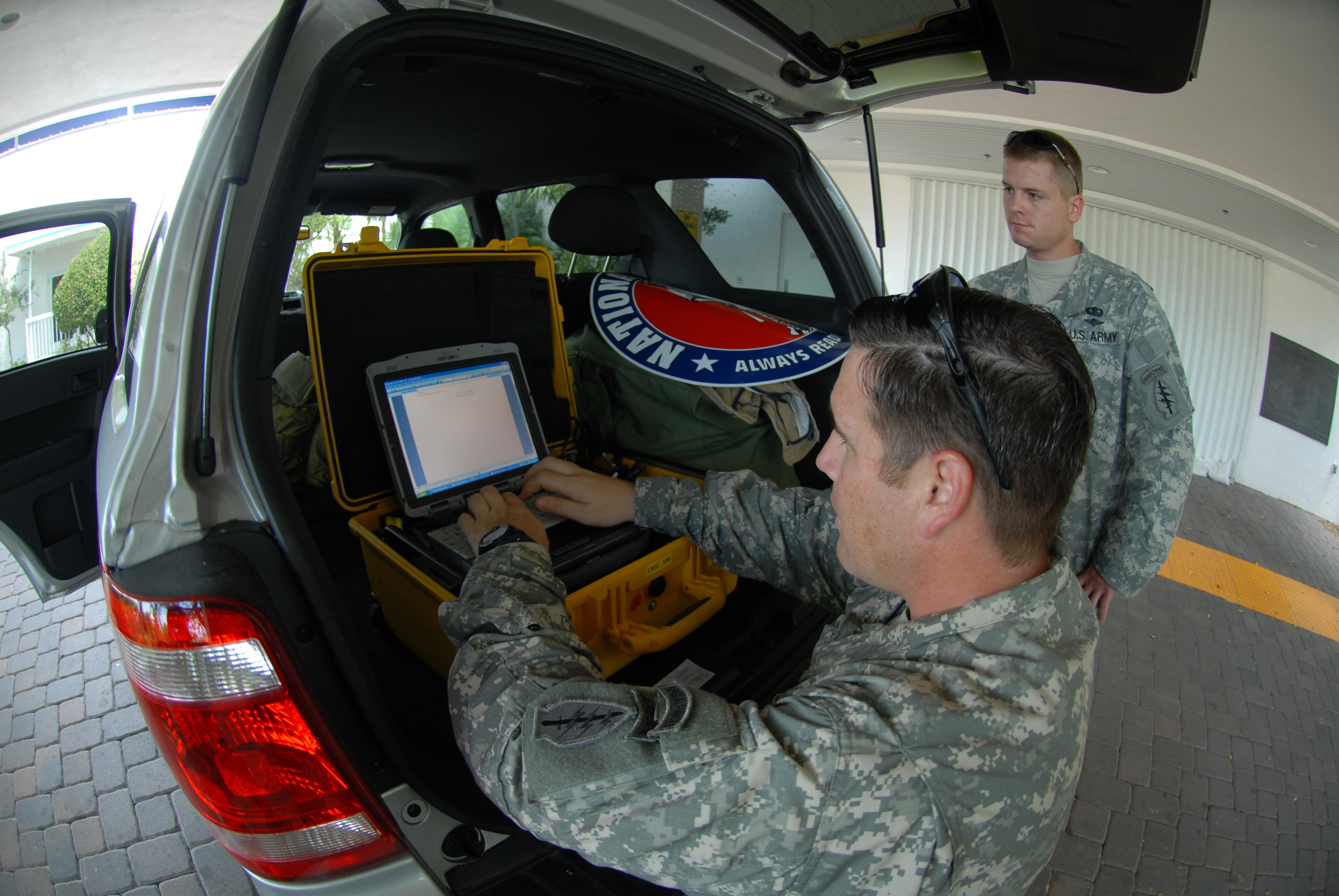
A Florida Army National Guardsman uses a Single Mobile User Case Set to send a situation report on ongoing preparations for Hurricane Ike in Key West, Florida.

On September 5, Florida Governor Charlie Crist declared a state of emergency in advance of Ike's arrival, (which was expected to be as early as September 8). Authorities in Key West issued a mandatory evacuation for all visitors for September 6. The Federal Emergency Management Agency (FEMA) positioned supplies, and emergency response crews in Florida and along the Gulf Coast.

Florida Keys officials began evacuations on the low-lying chain of islands in phases, starting at the end in Key West by 8 am Sunday and continuing throughout the day—at noon for the Middle Keys, and at 4 pm for the Upper Keys, including Key Largo. Visitors were told to leave on Saturday. Overall 15,000 tourists evacuated, but the storm stayed to the south, only causing minor beach erosion.

=== Texas ===
On September 7, The Texas Water/Wastewater Agency Response Network (TXWARN) activated its 700-member utility mutual aid network and began coordination with the State Emergency Operations Center and the Texas Commission on Environmental Quality (TCEQ) to begin preparations and notifications to utilities to prepare for Ike. State rural water associations activated mutual aid networks to prepare for the landfall of Ike while still providing assistance to areas affected by Hurricane Gustav. The Texas Rural Water Association held meetings with state agencies on September 9, to plan for landfall along the Texas Gulf Coast.

On September 11, forecasting models began to show Ike making landfall just south of Galveston. City Manager Steven LeBlanc late Wednesday issued a mandatory evacuation order for the low-lying west end of Galveston Island. Later, the mandatory evacuation order was extended to the entire island of Galveston, as well as low-lying areas around Houston, Texas. Mandatory evacuations were also ordered for Jefferson, Orange, and Chambers counties located east of Houston. Voluntary evacuations were in effect for Hardin and Tyler as well as Newton and Jasper counties. Residents evacuating ahead of Ike were received by emergency workers in the Dallas/Fort Worth(DFW) Metroplex where they were provided a place of refuge, medical treatment, and provisions. In addition to the orders of local and state officials, federal officials were thoroughly involved in evacuation decisions. On September 10, U.S. President George W. Bush made an emergency declaration for Texas, making more federal help available for preparations and evacuations. More than one million people evacuated in advance of Hurricane Ike, but more than 100,000 people did not.

At 8:19 pm (CDT) September 11, the National Weather Service in Houston/Galveston, Texas issued a strongly worded bulletin, regarding storm surge along the shoreline of Galveston Bay. The bulletin advised that residents living in single-family homes in some parts of coastal Texas faced "certain death" if they did not heed orders to evacuate. Reports said as many as 40 percent of Galveston's citizens did not pay attention to the warnings. It was feared to be much the same in Port Arthur, and it was predicted that low-lying areas between Morgan City, Louisiana and Baffin Bay, Texas, particularly those areas east of Ike's projected eye landfall would experience the greatest damage from storm surges of up to 20 feet (6.1 m).

The price of gas increased in the expectation of damage to some of the numerous oil refineries along the South Texas coast, or at least delays in production from the oil and gas platforms in the Gulf of Mexico. 14 oil refineries shut down production and nearly 150 oil tankers and cargo ships waited off-shore as every port from Lake Charles, Louisiana to Corpus Christi, Texas shut down in preparation for the storm.

== Impact ==
Fatalities by country
Country	Deaths	Missing
Haiti	74	N/A
Dominican Republic	2	N/A
Cuba	7	N/A
United States	113	16
Total	196	16

=== Lucayan Archipelago ===
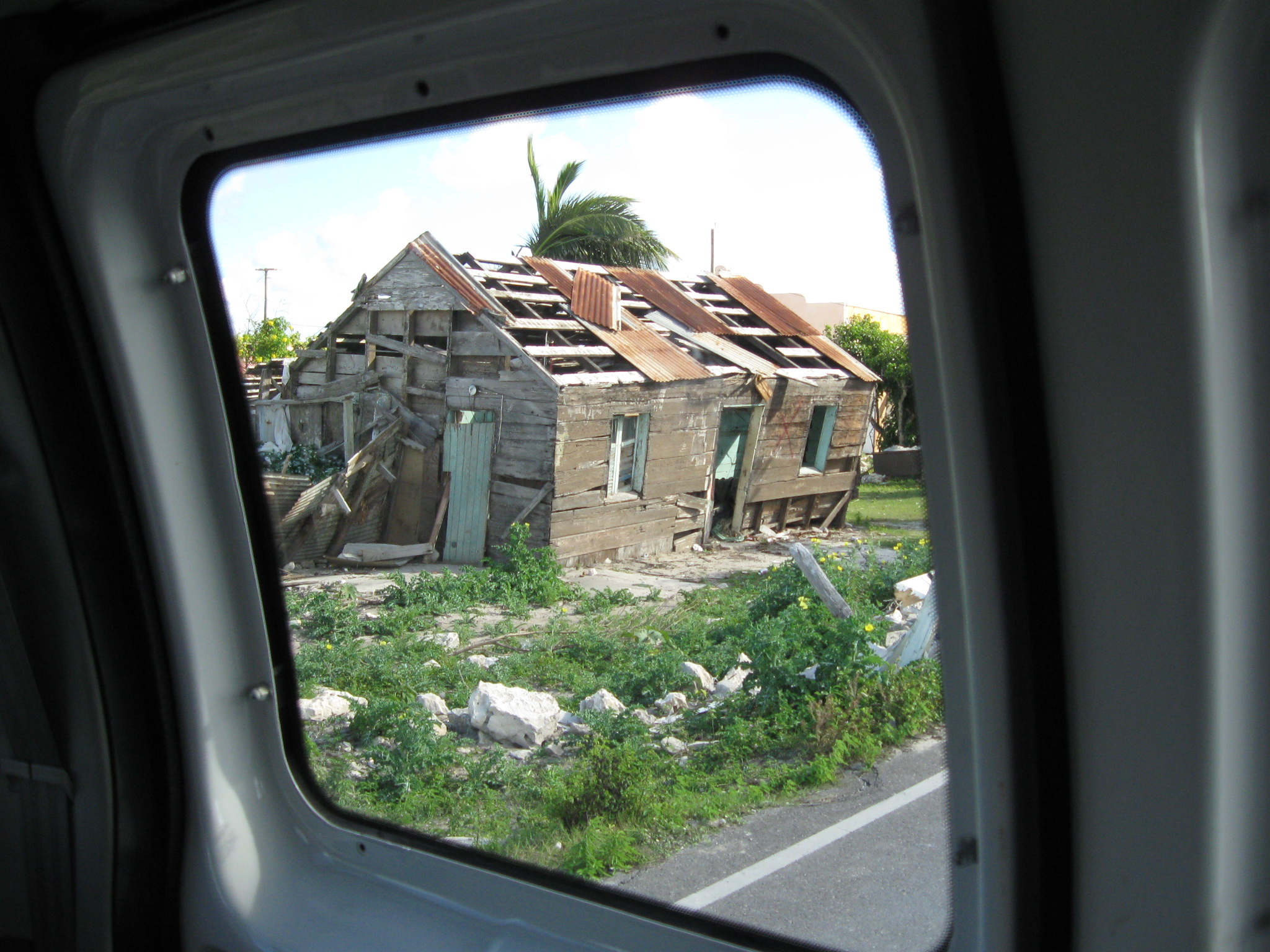
Numerous hurricane-damaged houses, buildings, and structures were still to be found in early January 2009 on Grand Turk.

Power was lost throughout Grand Turk Island, an estimated 80%–95% of the houses there were damaged, 20% of which was a total loss. There was also significant structural damage to roofs and buildings containing health services resulting in the disruption of most health services. The local pharmacy roof collapsed, destroying the area's prescription drug supply, the police station, and the prison was significantly damaged and local supplies facilities were either damaged or destroyed. A two-year-old cruise ship terminal on Grand Turk owned by Carnival Cruise Lines was significantly damaged. Water and electricity were also disrupted but since have been restored. Meanwhile, in South Caicos, 95% of the houses were also damaged, with over one-third significantly damaged or destroyed. Damage also occurred on other islands, mostly agricultural or the fishing industry, but in general, the damage was minor.

Buildings on the islands have been severely weakened and 750 people have lost their homes. Due to the extent and magnitude of damage and affected the population, the Government of the Turks and Caicos declared Grand Turk and South Caicos Islands disaster areas.

In Great Inagua Island, the Bahamas, eighty percent of houses sustained damage with almost a third of them having significant damage. The local Morton Salt factory was damaged and shut down operations. A few outlining islands suffered minor damage and no casualties were reported. Overall damage from the Turks and Caicos and the Bahamas was estimated between $50 million and $200 million.

=== Haiti ===
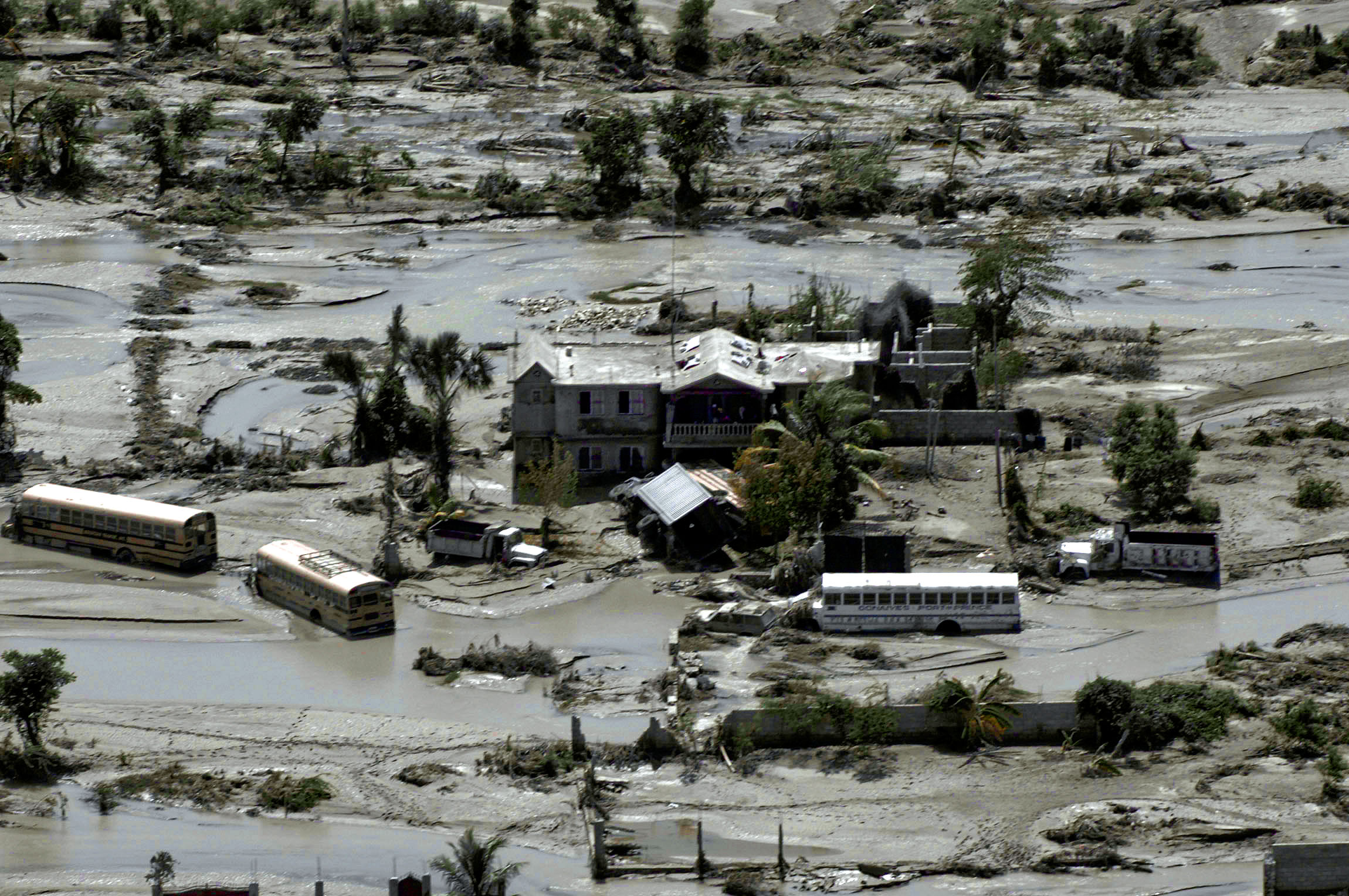
The remains of a school in Port-au-Prince, Haiti on September 15, 2008

The outer bands of Ike caused additional flooding in Haiti, which was already devastated by Hanna and also hit hard by Fay and Gustav. The last bridge still standing into the city of Gonaïves was washed away, slowing relief in the community considerably and creating a deep humanitarian and food crisis in the hard-hit region. 74 deaths were reported in Haiti from Ike, most of which were in the coastal community of Cabaret which was swept away by floodwaters and mudslides. Haitian Prime Minister Michèle Pierre-Louis called for help at the end of the week, saying that four storms in three weeks have left over 550 dead and as many as one million homeless. She also said that parts of Gonaïves were so severely damaged that the city may have to be rebuilt elsewhere. Two additional deaths were reported in the Dominican Republic.

=== Cuba ===
Costliest Cuban hurricanes
Rank	Hurricane	Season	Damage	Refs.
1	Irma	2017	$13.2 billion	
2	Ike	2008	$7.3 billion	
3	Matthew	2016	$2.58 billion	
4	Gustav	2008	$2.1 billion	
5	Michelle	2001	$2 billion	
5	Sandy	2012	$2 billion	
7	Dennis	2005	$1.5 billion	
8	Ivan	2004	$1.2 billion	
9	Rafael	2024	$1.08 billion	
10	Charley	2004	$923 million	

About 2.6 million Cubans, a fourth of the population, were evacuated ahead of Ike. In Baracoa, 200 homes were reported to be destroyed and waves were running 23 ft (7 m) high and peaked at 40 ft (12 m) in different areas of Cuba. The Category 4 hurricane made landfall on September 8 on the north coast of eastern Cuba in the province of Holguín near Puerto de Sama, with sustained winds of about 130 mph (209 km/h), causing widespread flooding and damage to the eastern provinces. It passed across the central provinces of Holguín, Las Tunas, and Camagüey, emerging over the sea to the south of Cuba during the day. Ike dropped to Category One intensity by the time it crossed the island. It then followed the southern coast of Cuba and crossed the western end of the island in Pinar del Río Province, close to the path taken by Hurricane Gustav ten days previously. The western areas of Cuba, already devastated by just 10 days before Ike hit, suffered additional major flooding from the rain and storm surge. The sugar cane crop was devastated, with over 3,400 square kilometres (1,300 sq mi) destroyed. The banana, yucca, coffee, and corn crops also suffered significant damage. Alongside Gustav, they were described as the "worst ever" storms by Cuban officials.

In total, seven people were killed in Cuba from Ike due to drowning or collapsing structures. Over 300,000 houses were damaged, with an estimated 43,000 a total loss. The combined damage estimate from Ike and Gustav, and succeeding Paloma is about $9.7 billion (USD), with $7.3 billion of that from Ike, making Ike the most destructive hurricane in Cuban history at the time. It was later surpassed by Hurricane Irma almost exactly nine years later.

=== United States ===
Radar animation of Ike at landfall

Costliest U.S. Atlantic hurricanes (Note: The storm category color indicates the intensity of the hurricane when landfalling in the U.S.)
Rank	Hurricane	Season	Damage
1	3 Katrina	2005	$125 billion
1	4 Harvey	2017	$125 billion
3	4 Ian	2022	$112 billion
4	4 Maria	2017	$90 billion
5	4 Helene	2024	$78.7 billion
6	4 Ida	2021	$75 billion
7	ET Sandy	2012	$65 billion
8	4 Irma	2017	$52.1 billion
9	3 Milton	2024	$34.3 billion
10	2 Ike	2008	$30 billion

Hurricane Ike was one of the largest-diameter US Gulf Coast hurricanes. Though large size does not imply strength—which is based on sustained wind measurements—it can mean that more people are exposed to its hazards.

Due to the intensity of the storm, Texas closed many of its chemical plants and oil refineries. Because much of the United States oil refining capacity is located in Texas, the closings caused a temporary increase in the prices of gasoline, home heating oil, and natural gas. Increases were particularly high in North Carolina, especially in the mountains, where average prices were as much as 60 cents higher than the national average. The closing of refineries so soon after Hurricane Gustav, and the time required to restart production, also resulted in shortages of gasoline in such places as the Carolinas and Tennessee, partly as a result of panic buying. 113 direct and indirect deaths have been reported in the US, including 85 in Texas (18 direct), eight in Louisiana, one in Arkansas, two in Tennessee, one in Kentucky, seven in Indiana, four in Missouri, two in Illinois, two in Michigan, seven in Ohio and one in Pennsylvania. As of August 2011, 16 people remain unaccounted for, 11 of them in the Galveston area. On September 15, 2008, the United States Congress held a moment of silence for those who died in the hurricane.

==== MV Antalina ====
On September 11, the MV Antalina, a 584-foot (178 m) cargo ship, was among the ships that left Port Arthur to avoid the hurricane. The ship had a crew of 22 and carried a cargo of petroleum coke. On September 12, the ship's engine failed, and the ship was adrift 90 nautical miles (170 km) from the shore. The crew unsuccessfully attempted to repair the engine and requested to be evacuated by the Coast Guard, but the rescue mission was aborted because weather conditions were not within the safety parameters. The crew was forced to ride out the storm but kept in contact with the Coast Guard. The ship successfully rode out the storm and all 22 crew members were uninjured. On September 13, a tugboat was dispatched to return the vessel to port.

==== Louisiana ====
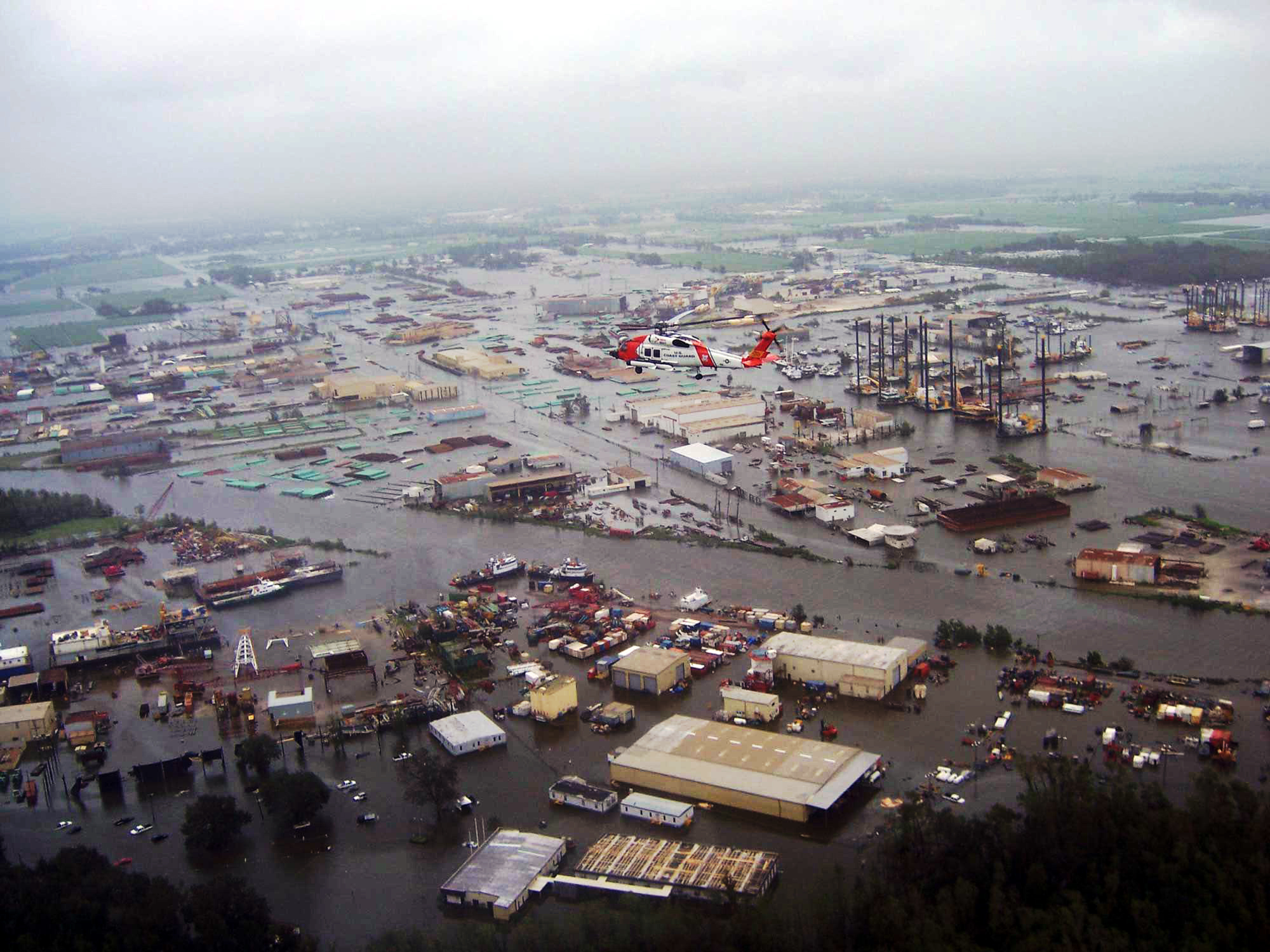
A Coast Guard helicopter flying over New Iberia, Louisiana

Ike's storm surge affected Louisiana well ahead of the hurricane's landfall in Texas. Areas in coastal south-central and southwestern Louisiana, some of which were flooded by Gustav, were re-flooded as a result of Ike. Some areas that had not yet recovered from Gustav power outages received additional outages. The hardest-hit areas were in and around Cameron Parish, with nearly every square inch of the coastline in that area was flooded heavily, reaching as far north as Lake Charles, nearly 30 miles inland. Hundreds of people had to be rescued, including 363 people who were rescued by Louisiana Department of Wildlife and Fisheries Search and Rescue teams in conjunction with the Louisiana National Guard and the U.S. Coast Guard.

One person was killed in a flooded bayou in Terrebonne Parish, and a wind-related death was reported near Houma. Two other deaths took place in a car crash in the evacuation phase in Iberville Parish, and two other storm-related deaths in Jefferson Davis Parish that were ruled as deaths by natural causes.

==== Texas ====
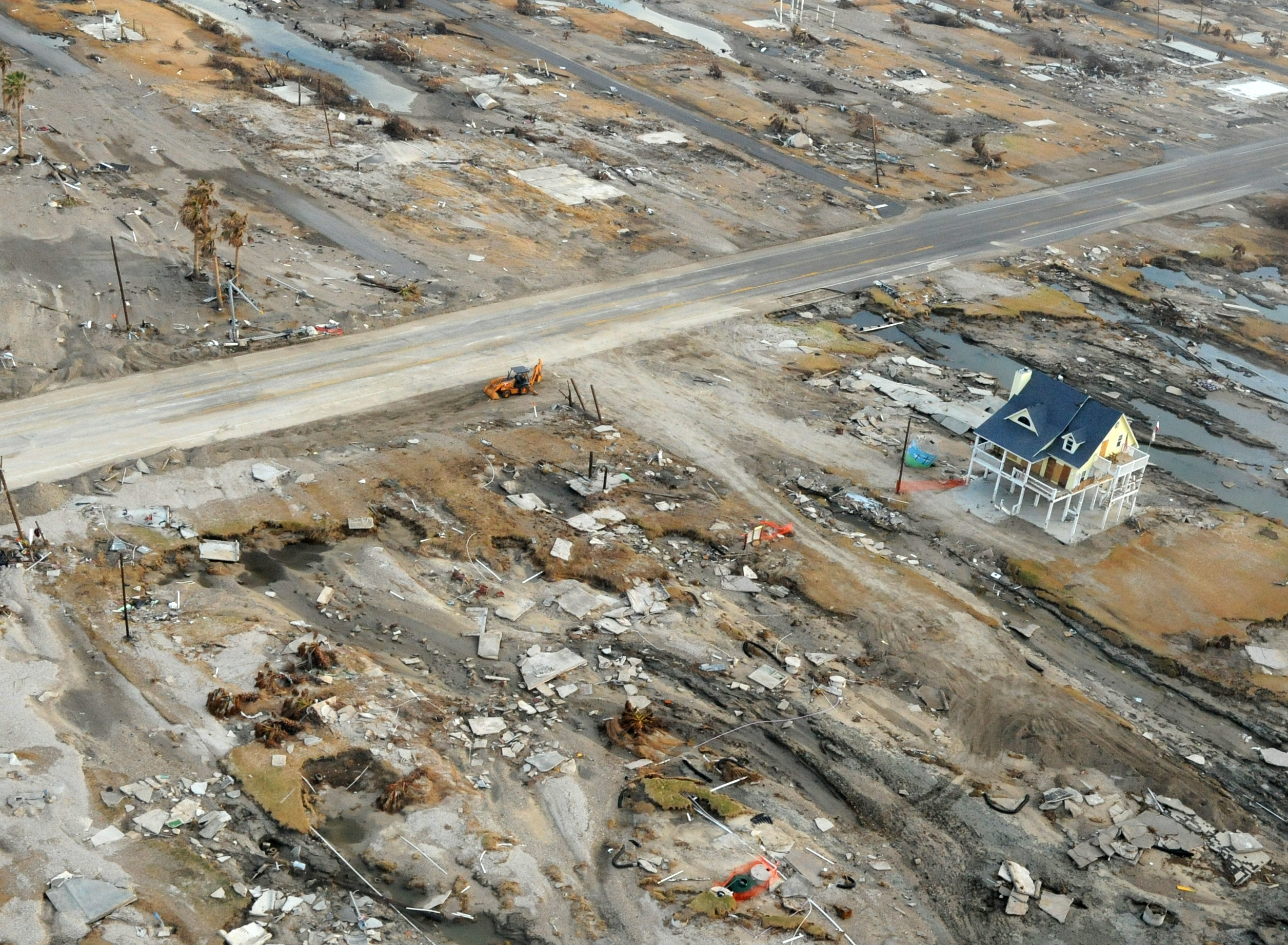
Damage from Ike in Gilchrist, which was largely destroyed by the hurricane

On the morning of September 13, 2008, the eye of Hurricane Ike approached the upper Texas coast, making landfall at 2:10 am CDT over the east end of Galveston Island, with a high storm surge, and travelled north up Galveston Bay, along the east side of Houston (see storm-path image). People in low-lying areas who had not heeded evacuation orders, in single-family one- or two-story homes, were warned by the weather service that they faced "certain death" from the overnight storm surge. Nearly 16,000 families in the Galveston-Houston area stayed in temporary shelters under federal housing programs, while 1700 were referred for assistance but could not be reached or were refused aid.

In regional Texas towns, electrical power began failing on September 12 before 8 pm CDT, leaving millions without power (estimates range from 2.8 million to 4.5 million customers). Grocery store shelves in the Houston area were empty for weeks in the aftermath of the storm.

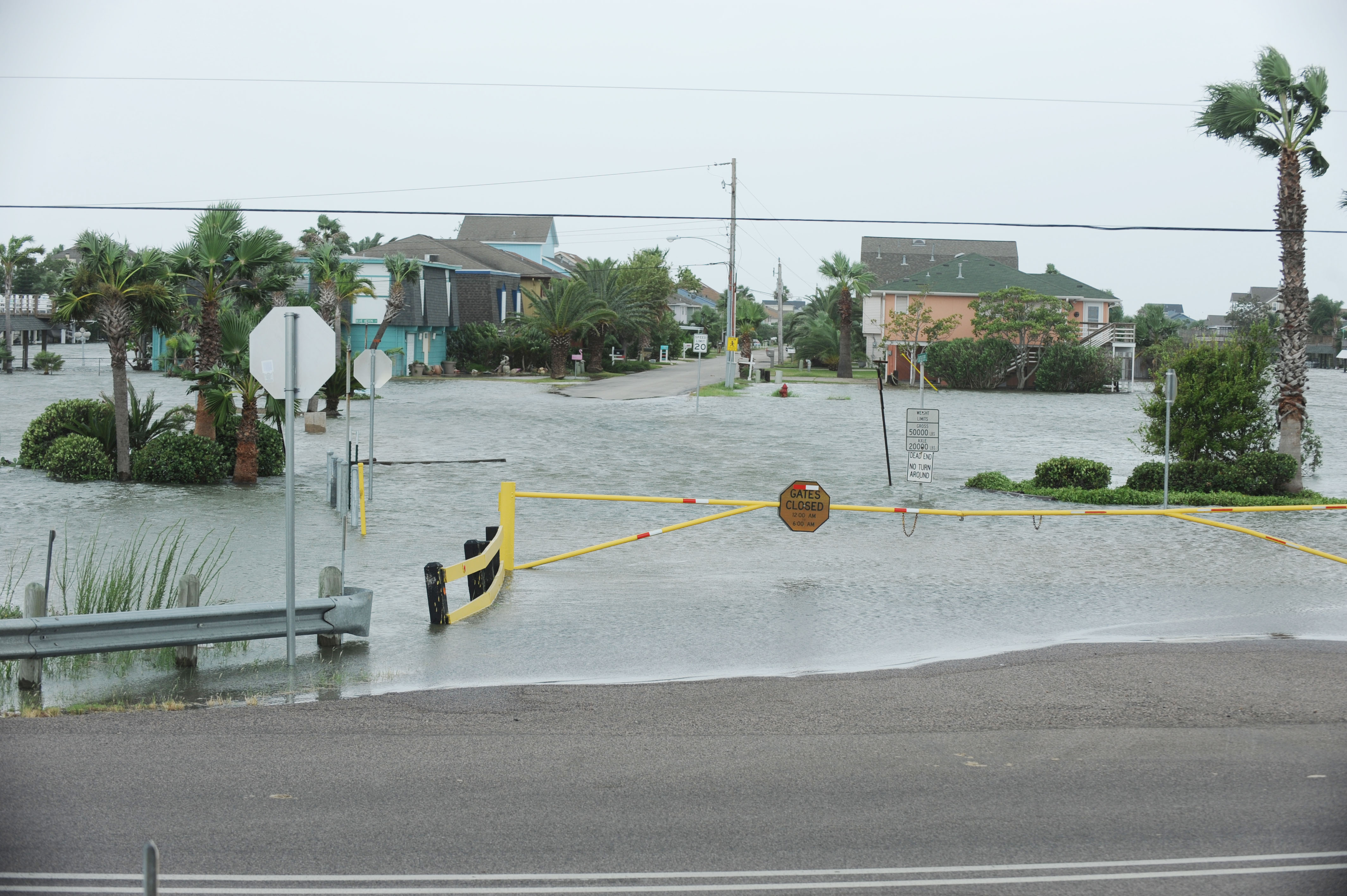
Flood waters begin to rise in a neighborhood of Bayou Vista, Texas.

In Galveston, by 4 pm CDT (2100 UTC) on September 12, the rising storm surge began overtopping the 17 ft (5.2 m) Galveston Seawall, which faces the Gulf of Mexico; waves had been crashing along the seawall earlier, from 9 am CDT. Although Seawall Boulevard is elevated above the shoreline, many areas of town slope down behind the seawall to the lower elevation of Galveston Island.

Even though there were advance evacuation plans, Mary Jo Naschke, spokesperson for the city of Galveston, estimated that (as of Friday morning) a quarter of the city's residents paid no attention to calls for them to evacuate, despite predictions that most of Galveston Island would suffer heavy flooding from storm tide. By 6 pm Friday night estimates varied as to how many of the 58,000 residents remained, but the figures of remaining residents were in the thousands. Widespread flooding included downtown Galveston: six feet (1.8 m) deep inside the Galveston County Courthouse, and the University of Texas Medical Branch, the primary hospital in Galveston county, was dealt significant damage due to flooding. The wide-scale flooding caused failures to all the facilities systems and allowed mold to invade all the buildings. Tourist attractions on the island suffered various degrees of damage. The Lone Star Flight Museum suffered massive damage, as the storm surge washed through the airport and hangars with about 8 feet (2.4 m) of water; however, Moody Gardens was built with storms in mind and was able to withstand the worst of the storm.

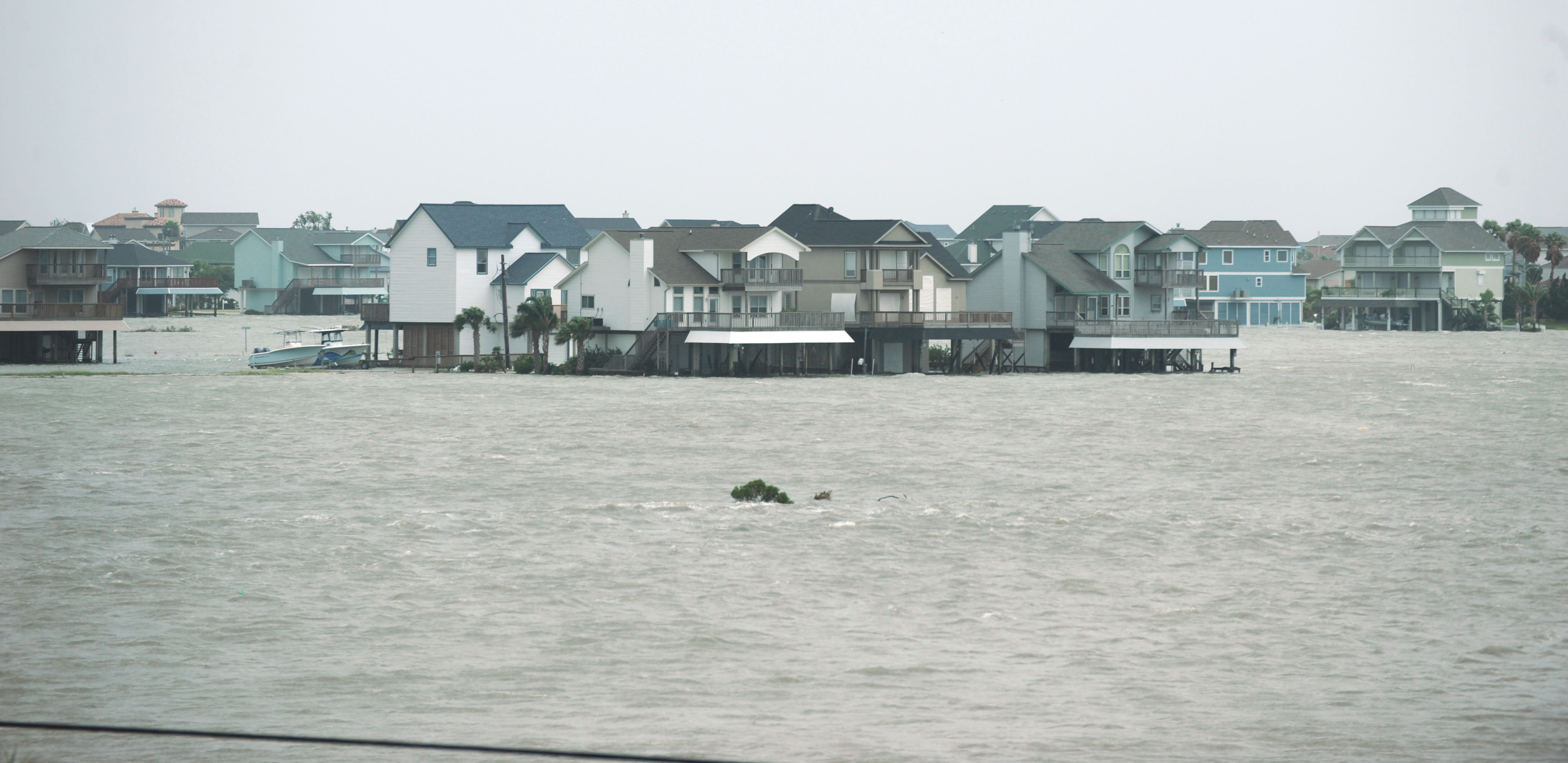
Flooding in Galveston, Texas

In Houston, windows also broke in downtown buildings, including the 75-story JP Morgan Chase Tower, and Reliant Stadium lost part of its roof. As a result of the high wind and eyewall that passed directly through the city, power outages were a major problem. Some residents were without electricity for over a month. Because the storm system moved rapidly and did not linger over Houston, flooding was not a major problem for most of the city, as it normally is in a storm event, as a result of the relatively flat topography.

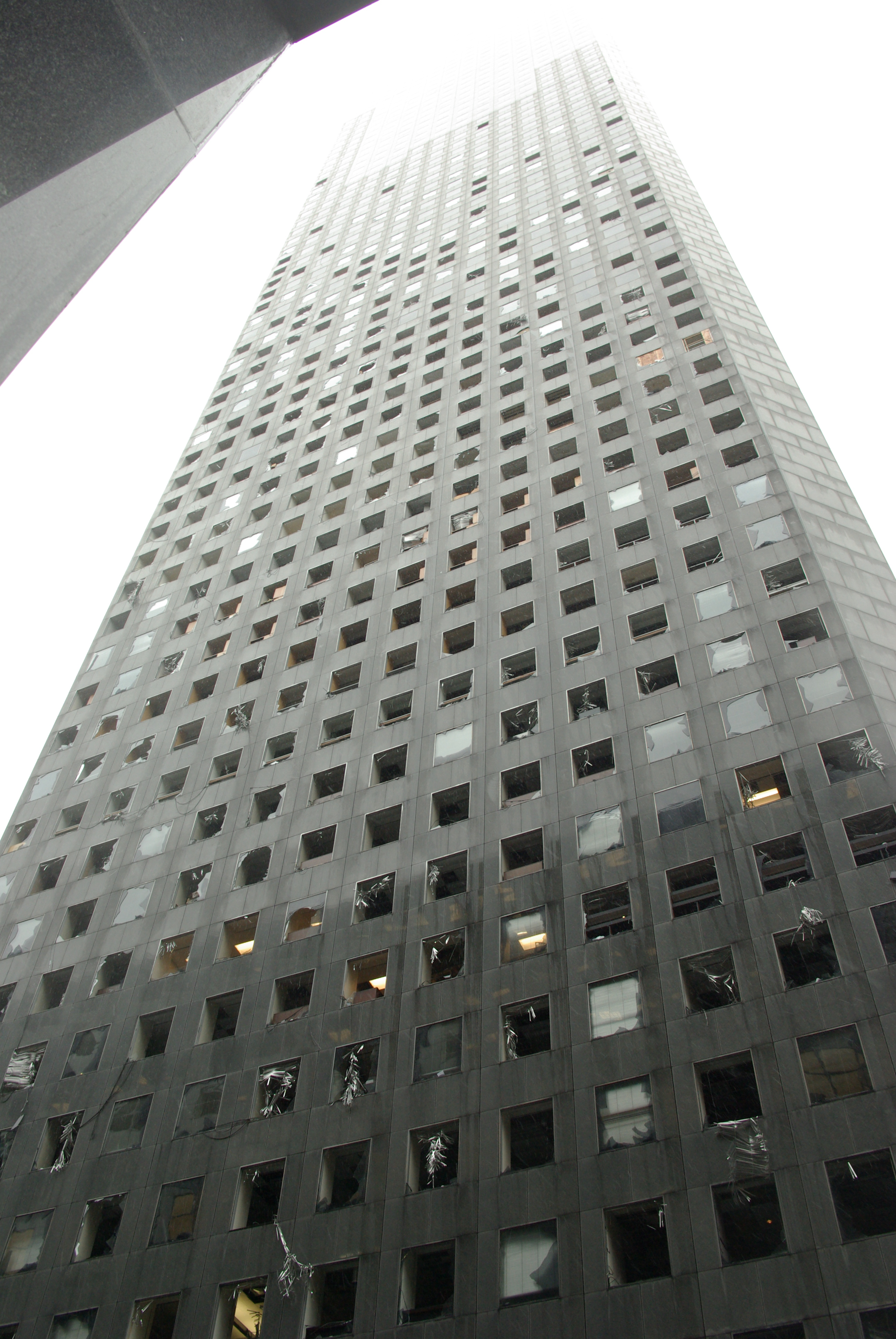
Windows were broken throughout the JPMorgan Chase Tower.

On Bolivar Peninsula, Texas, dozens of people were rescued as flood waters exceeded 12 feet (3.7 m) above sea level in advance of the hurricane. Many residents, some trapped by high water on the road at Rollover Pass and others elsewhere along Bolivar Peninsula were not rescued. The peninsula bore the brunt of Ike's right-front quadrant, historically the worst part of a hurricane, and experienced catastrophic damage with the worst being between Rollover Pass and Gilchrist, Texas – west of High Island. Estimates of lost homes in the peninsula were around 80%.

The Southeast Texas communities of Bridge City on Sabine Lake and large areas of nearby Orange (80 miles or 130 kilometres from the center of landfall) were inundated by the storm surge which traveled as much as 16 miles (26 km) inland from the coast. Bridge City mayor Kirk Roccaforte estimated that only about 14 homes (later updated to around two dozen) in the city were unaffected by the surge.

NASA's Johnson Space Center suffered minor roof damage to Mission Control and minor cosmetic damage to some of its other buildings. NASA's operations at Ellington Field also sustained roof and awning damage, and one hangar was severely damaged.

==== Farther Inland ====
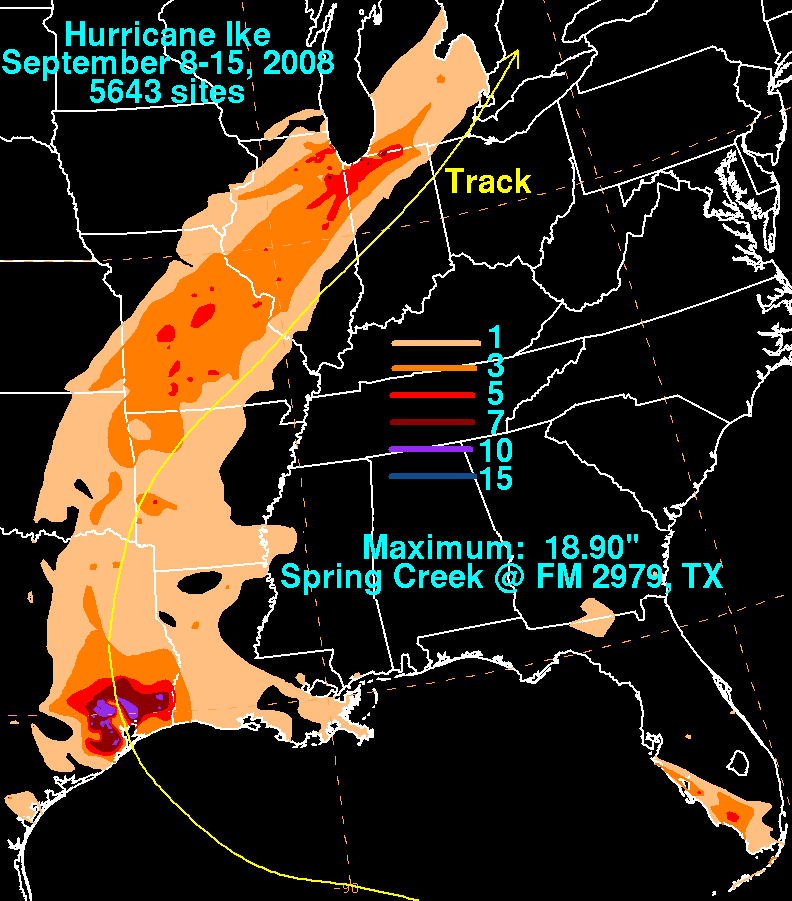
Ike's storm total rainfall across the United States

On September 14, after Ike became extratropical and was enhanced by an upper-level shortwave trough, a major wind event took place across the lower and middle Ohio Valley and lower Great Lakes, and significant rainfall and flooding took place to the west. The St. Louis Metropolitan Area experienced hurricane conditions, with Ike's remnants inflicting severe damage to homes. Several areas in Illinois and Indiana, already flooded by the frontal boundary to the north, saw significant additional rainfall. Due to flooding in Chicago, Todd Stroger declared a state of emergency for Cook County due to flooding of the Des Plaines River. Hurricane-force wind gusts were reported to the east of the centre across parts of Kentucky, Indiana, Ohio, and Pennsylvania with significant wind damage including structural damage to buildings and trees. The Louisville area declared a state of emergency due to major damage and power outages, and the Louisville International Airport was closed temporarily. A LG&E spokesperson said that this was the worst power outage in 30 years. Later in the day, a statewide state of emergency was declared in Kentucky by Governor Steve Beshear. Cincinnati-Northern Kentucky International Airport was also temporarily shut down, and the control tower was evacuated. In Cincinnati, numerous reports of roof damage and uprooted trees were called in to law enforcement, and on September 15, most of the schools in Hamilton County, Butler County, and Warren County had classes canceled because of power outages, some of which lasted seven days.

Wind gusts of 75 mph (121 km/h) were recorded in both Cincinnati and Columbus, which is equivalent to sustained wind levels found in a Category 1 hurricane. Additionally, a state of emergency was declared in Ohio. Damages in Ohio were originally estimated at $553 million with 131,000 insurance claims filed in the first few days following the storm. The overall total damage in Ohio exceeded $1.1 billion, tying the 1974 Xenia tornado as the costliest storm in Ohio's history. Wind gusts up to 81 mph (130 km/h) were recorded in Washington County, Indiana. Wind gusts of 63 mph (101 km/h) were recorded at Indianapolis International Airport.

Coming into Indianapolis, on September 14, Ike also caused disruptions to the first-ever motorcycle Grand Prix held in Indianapolis, stopping both the 125cc and MotoGP races after two-thirds of the race distance, and causing the cancellation of the 250cc race. In Arkansas, about 200,000 customers lost power as a result of the winds, the worst power loss in that state since an ice storm in 2000. In the Louisville area, over 300,000 customers were without power — the worst power outage in the utility's history. The Cincinnati metropolitan area was hard hit as well, with over 927,000 customers losing power in that region. A Duke Energy spokesperson said "We have never seen anything like this. Never. We're talking about 90 percent of our customers without power." There were so many power outages and so few workers available Duke Energy was thinking of sending workers from their base in Charlotte, North Carolina. Many homes and business were without power for three–seven days. Cincinnati Public Schools cancelled classes for students for at least three days for all schools. In the Dayton, Ohio area 300,000 of 515,000 Dayton Power & Light Co. customers lost power at some point following severe wind storms on the afternoon of September 14, according to a company spokesperson. Also hard hit were central Ohio (with over 350,000 customers losing power) and northeastern Ohio (with over 310,000 customers losing power), as well as Illinois (49,000), Missouri (85,000), and western Pennsylvania (with over 180,000 customers losing power). In western Kentucky, outside crews had to be brought in from as far away as Mississippi to restore power. In Indiana, about 350,000 customers lost power statewide, mainly in the southern part of the state. In New York State, over 100,000 customers were reported without power. In total, 28 deaths have been blamed on Ike in the inland states.

=== Canada ===
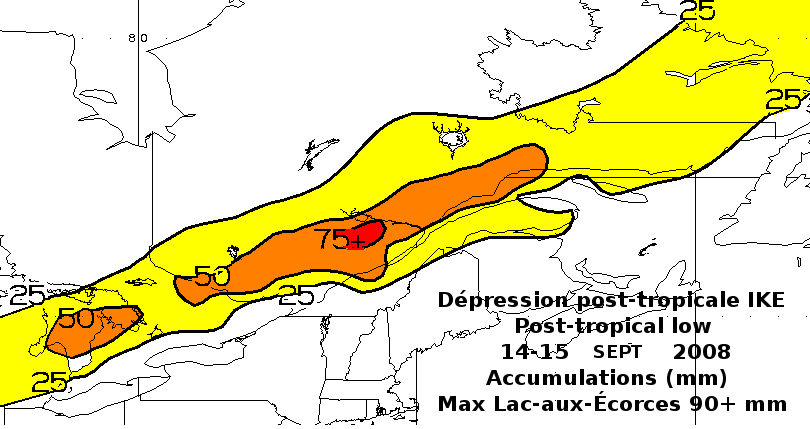
Accumulations in Canada

In Ontario, Ike's remnants brought a record amount of rain on Sunday, September 14, in the Windsor region. It was closely following a slow-moving frontal system that had drenched the city the day before, dumping 75.2 millimeters (2.96 inches) of rain and breaking the old record of 39.1 mm (1.54 in) in 1979, according to Environment Canada. Most damage in the Windsor area with Ike was confined to downed power lines and toppled tree branches with the wind gusts reaching 80 km/h (50 mph), with spotty street flooding that made driving completely treacherous in some areas. Highways were washed out in the Bruce Peninsula, and trees were uprooted in London, Ontario. The storm continued to cause wind and rain damage as it continued east along the St. Lawrence River leaving around 25,000 customers without electricity, especially in Belleville, Brockville, Bancroft, Peterborough, Bowmanville, Huntsville, and Timmins.

In Quebec, regions to the north of the Saint Lawrence River received 50 to 70 mm (2.0 to 2.8 in) of rainfall (Hautes-Laurentides, Haute-Mauricie, Réserve faunique des Laurentides, Saguenay-Lac-Saint-Jean, Charlevoix and Côte-Nord). Maximum rainfall was recorded between Lac-St-Jean and the Réserve faunique des Laurentides with a station recording more than 90 mm (3.5 in) of rain Along the river, the amount was more in the 10 and 30 mm (0.4 and 1.2 in) range, except in Quebec City area which received almost 50 mm (2.0 in), most of it between 7:00 pm and 8:00 pm. This rain caused small inundations, storm drain overflows, and closed one major highway. In Montreal, high humidity levels pushed by the system caused electrical malfunction one of the lines of the subway, stranding over 25,000 commuters. High winds up to 78 km/h (48 mph) caused, at their worst, over 25,000 households to lose electricity in Montreal, Laval, Estrie and Montérégie and when it reached the Magdalen Islands, it had enough strength to cause a sailboat, the Océan, to sink. Its six passengers were rescued by a helicopter of the Canadian Coast Guard.

The "Ike Spike" in gasoline prices was quite severe in Canada, with gas prices rising anywhere from 15 to 20 cents per liter.

=== Iceland ===
Ike's remnants combined with an unusual depression that affected southwestern Iceland on September 17, three days after Ike became extratropical. The storm produced 9 m (30 ft) waves along southwest coasts of the island. Rainfall peaked near 200 mm (7.9 in) close to Reykjavík. Wind gusts were measured up to 89 mph (143 km/h). Strong winds on the backside of the system produced a large dust storm in northern areas of the island.

== Aftermath ==
=== Turks and Caicos Islands and the Bahamas ===
Due to the damage brought by Ike in the Turks and Caicos Islands, the insular government declared the islands of Grand Turk and South Caicos as disaster areas. Damage on the islands was surveyed immediately following the hurricane's passage by a CDERA assessment team from Jamaica. Following the occurrence of extensive power outages, the Caribbean Electric Utilities Services Cooperation offered to support the restoration of power services. The British HMS Iron Duke (F234) was sent to the islands to assist in recovery efforts, and personnel from the British Red Cross were also dispatched.

=== Criticism of aid ===
After Hurricane Ike, many residents applied to FEMA for loans and FEMA trailers. Many residents were forced to wait several weeks until their trailers arrived. Some waited for up to two months, living in hotels, in homes of relatives several miles away, or in their homes, with no power or running water. Many residents were angry at the response that FEMA gave to the problem. Texas state leaders also accused FEMA of foot dragging and insensitivity.

$3.1 billion in federal aid was eventually allocated to Texas by the Department of Housing and Urban Development. It was supposed to be used to repair single-family homes of lower and middle-class income families, but as of 2011 only 10% of those funds were released, while the rest were held up because of "state bureaucracy".

=== Public and mental health issues ===
Hurricane Ike also brought many health issues to the victims. Damages from the homes and the environment helped create these issues amongst the public. Following the disaster, communities were challenged to provide the correct medical treatment in emergency rooms and other medical facilities. It developed stress restricting victims their basic health services. Orange County had an 88.5 percent capacity loss of intermediate care facilities reducing its overall capacity. By late October five hospitals that usually served the areas that were impacted by the hurricane stayed closed while only one hospital continued to operate but with a limit of patients.

The need for mental health services increased after the disaster especially for depression and post-traumatic stress disorder. Most individuals will not progress to constant behavioral or mental health problems, but the World Health Organization estimates between five and ten percent of victims will have more long-term issues. Telephone interviews and mental health diagnoses were ordered randomly to households concerning the effects of Hurricane Ike. Post-disaster mental health occurrences were 5.9 percent for post-traumatic stress disorder, 4.5 percent for major depressive episode, and 9.9 percent for general anxiety disorder. A Galveston Bay Recovery Study (GBRS) was a survey distributed through a random stratified cluster sampling of victims in the Galveston Bay area for research on traumatic stress and disaster exposure. When surveyed victims were asked how they felt and what they experienced after the hurricane there was an immediate emotional response to fear of the loss of property, employment, displacement, and damages. Children were targeted for physical abuse by parents and guardians because of loss of property and employment. Results of post-traumatic stress disorder, depressive symptoms, anxiety symptoms, dysfunctions, and disabilities were reported when asked how stressful their lives have been since Hurricane Ike. There was an increase of impairments, interference with social activities and health behaviors such as eating poorly, smoking more, and restlessness. Development of these mental health problems was due to the lack of sufficient clean clothing, electricity, food, money, transportation, or water for at least one week.

Victims and workers face numerous residential and occupational hazards during the process of repairing their homes or community. An exposure to hazardous materials through the process created health threats of diseases, air contamination, smoke inhalation, and lead poisoning. As disaster victims return to their damaged homes children were exposed to the debris and other hazards, developing a risk of injury. After the hurricane because of power outages individuals and family misused portable generators causing carbon monoxide poisoning. Eighty-two percent to 87 percent of carbon monoxide were caused by the improper use of generators. The Texas Department of State Health Services issued that gasoline generators should not be used indoors. Fifty-four people were reported by the Texas poison centers to have storm-related carbon monoxide exposure. The Undersea and Hyperbaric Medical Society and The Centers for Disease Control reported 15 people had to undergo hyperbaric oxygen treatment for carbon monoxide poisoning. Symptoms from exposure were headaches, nausea, and vomiting with the majority of the treated cases under the age of eighteen.

=== Sports ===
Hurricane Ike forced the Houston Astros and the Chicago Cubs to play out their 3-game set in Milwaukee at Miller Park. Ike also forced the postponement of the second-week NFL game between the Houston Texans and the Baltimore Ravens. The game was later made up in Houston after repairs were made to Reliant Stadium on November 9, 2008. It also forced the NCAA football game on September 13 between the Houston Cougars and the Air Force Falcons to be moved from Robertson Stadium in Houston to Gerald Ford Stadium in Dallas. Ike also forced the postponement of a Texas Longhorns game in Austin, Texas due to increased evacuee traffic in the city's shelters. The Sam Houston Bearkats football game with Prairie View A&M was also canceled. Tickets for World Wrestling Entertainment (WWE) WrestleMania XXV were originally scheduled to go on sale September 20, 2008, but it was postponed due to the effect of Ike on the state of Texas until November 8, 2008.

=== Relief efforts ===
There were a number of relief efforts set up to help those caught up in Ike, including one set up by Portlight and Weather Underground. Most of them raised at least $10,000 to help out. The Portlight/Weather Underground effort created some initial controversy springing from the unexpected overwhelming response to requests for assistance.

Portlight delivered over $500,000 worth of equipment to people with disabilities and outlying communities that were impacted by Hurricane Ike. They also delivered pizza to the residents of the hard-hit Bolivar peninsula and helped provide a Christmas party for residents of Bridge City, Texas.

Direct Relief, an emergency response organization, provided over $1.1 million in hurricane emergency aid as of September 20, 2008. The organization sent shipments that contained medicines, and hygienic supplies.

=== Oil and gas spills ===
Hurricane Ike's winds, surge, and giant waves tossed storage tanks and punctured pipelines. However, operators in the Gulf of Mexico (ranging from major integrated producers like BP and Shell to small privately owned independents) shut in operations in advance of Ike's approach as a precautionary measure. As a result of these shut-ins, US oil production dropped from 5 million barrels per day (790,000 cubic meters per day) to 4 Mbbl/d (640,000 m^{3}/d) in the immediate aftermath of the hurricane. By late November, production was restored to pre-Ike levels. Despite the hurricane, only 500,000 U.S. gallons (1,900 cubic meters) of crude oil split into the Gulf of Mexico and the marshes, bayous and bays of Louisiana and Texas over a coastline distance of 185 miles (298 kilometres). Much of the spillage occurred in the High Island area of Galveston County, Texas, where storm surge rose over a low-lying oilfield and flooded the marshy area around several producing wells, beam pumps and storage tanks. During the days both before and after the storm, companies, and residents reported around 448 releases of gas, oil and other substances into the environment in Louisiana and Texas. The hardest hit places were industrial centres near Houston and Port Arthur, Texas, as well as oil production facilities off Louisiana's coast.

The Coast Guard, with the Environmental Protection Agency and state agencies, has responded to more than 3,000 pollution reports associated with the storm and its surge along the upper Texas coast. Most callers complain about abandoned propane tanks, paint cans and other hazardous materials containers turning up in marshes, backyards, and other places.

=== Collision of oil tanker with drilling rig ===
On March 6, 2009, a 159,000-ton Norwegian tanker, SKS Satilla, collided with jackup drilling rig Ensco 74, operated by Ensco (now Valaris Limited), which had been missing after Ike struck. The tanker's double hull prevented an oil spill at the site, 65 miles south of Galveston, which is 115 miles west of the original position of the rig. Four drilling rigs, including Ensco 74, were damaged by Ike, but Ensco 74 was the only missing rig. At least 52 oil platforms were damaged by Ike.

=== Retirement ===
Because of the tremendous damage and number of deaths caused by storm, the name Ike was retired by the World Meteorological Organization in April 2009, and will never be used again for an Atlantic tropical cyclone. It was replaced with Isaias for the 2014 season.

=== Hurricane mitigation ===
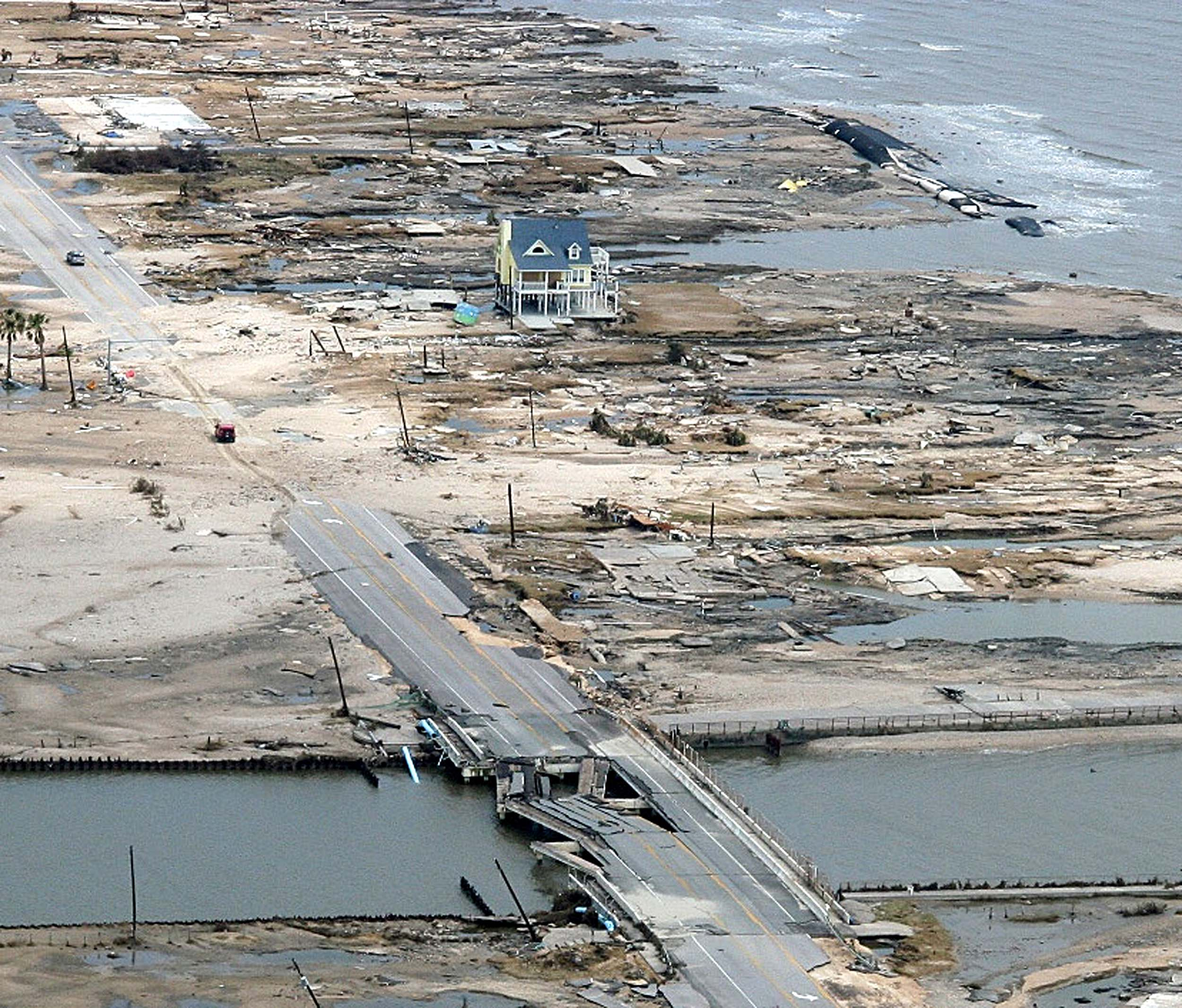
This house survived Ike, having been rebuilt to withstand Category 5 hurricanes after it was destroyed by Hurricane Rita (2005).

A commission was established by Rick Perry, the Texas Governor, following the hurricane to investigate preparing for and mitigating future disasters. A proposal has been put forth to build an "Ike Dike", a massive levee system which would protect the Galveston Bay, and the important industrial facilities which line the coast and the ship channel, from a future, potentially more destructive storm. The proposal has gained widespread support from a variety of business interests. As of 2009, it is currently only at the conceptual stage.

== See also ==
- Weather of 2008
- Tropical cyclones in 2008
- List of Cuba hurricanes
- List of Texas hurricanes (1980–present)
- List of costliest Atlantic hurricanes
