= JBeatz =

- Also known as: JBeatz
- Born: Jean Robert Pluviose; Arcahaie, Haiti
- Origin: Haiti
- Genres: Compas
- Occupation(s): Musician, recording artist, composer, producer, recording engineer, video director, and editor
- Years active: 1999–present

Jean Robert Pluviose, known professionally as JBeatz, is a Haitian-born recording artist, musician, composer, producer, recording engineer, video director, and editor.

== Biography ==
=== Early life and education ===
Pluviose was born in Arcahaie, Haiti, and spent much of his adolescence in the United States. During this period, he was exposed to a variety of musical genres and instruments. At the age of 14, he began studying classical piano, winning several awards at school recitals and competitions. He became actively involved in church music, where he played multiple instruments and developed his musical skills.

=== Career ===
In 1999, Pluviose released his first gospel album as part of the group Souffle Spirituel. Over the following decade, he established himself as a prolific musician, songwriter, composer, producer, recording engineer, video director, and editor. He collaborated with numerous prominent Haitian artists and contributed to several successful albums and popular tracks in the Haitian music industry.

== Discography ==
=== Studio albums ===
- Konbyen Tan Lèzòm Réte (1999)
- Our Own World (2011)
- 1 More Day (2014)
- Oh My God (2016)
- Allo Bonjour! (2017)
- New Beginning (2019)
- Banm Banm Banm (2020)
- Wow (10 Zan Pa 10 Jou) (2022)
- Enjoy Life (2024)

=== Single ===
- Our Own World (Remix) (2012)
- Cherry on Top (Remix) (feat. Top Adlerman (2014)
- Men Nwèl La (2015)
- Oh My God (feat. Wendyyy) (2015)
- I'm Doing Fine (2016)
- Lèw Manyen Moun Mwen (2017)
- I Fall in Love (2017)
- Gadon Fanm (feat.Baky, Mikaben, Flav) (2017)
- Lanmou Mechan (2019)
- You can do it (2025)
