= Délice =

- Communal section
- Location in Haiti
- Coordinates: 18.8124276°N 72.4992438°W
- Country: Haiti
- Department: Ouest
- Arrondissement: Arcahaie
- Elevation: 102 m (335 ft)
- Time zone: UTC-05:00 (EST)
  - Summer (DST): UTC-04:00 (EDT)

Délice (French pronunciation: [delis]) is a communal section in the Arcahaie commune in the Arcahaie Arrondissement, in the Ouest department of Haiti.

== See also ==
- Arcahaie, for a list of other settlements in the commune.
