= Passe, Haiti =

Passe
- Village
- Location in Haiti
- Coordinates: 18.8220001°N 72.5255152°W
- Country: Haiti
- Department: Ouest
- Arrondissement: Arcahaie
- Elevation: 95 m (312 ft)
- Time zone: UTC-05:00 (EST)
  - Summer (DST): UTC-04:00 (EDT)

Passe (French pronunciation: [pas]) is a village in the Arcahaie commune of the Arcahaie Arrondissement, in the Ouest department of Haiti.

== See also ==
- Arcahaie, for a list of other settlements in the commune.
