= Polish Haitians =

Minority of Polish ancestry in the Caribbean island of Haiti

Polish Haitian
Regions with significant populations
- Cazale, Cap-Haïtien, Fond-des-Blancs, Jacmel, La Baleine, La Vallée-de-Jacmel, Port-Salut, Saint-Jean-du-Sud

Languages
- Haitian Creole, French, Polish

Religion
- Roman Catholicism, Haitian Vodou and Judaism

Related ethnic groups
- other Polish diaspora

Polish Haitians (Note: Haitian Creole: Polonè-Ayisyen, coll. Lepologne; Polish: Polscy Haitańczycy; French: Haïtiens polonais) are Haitian people of Polish descent, dating to the early 19th century; a few may be Poles of more recent native birth that have gained Haitian citizenship, such as refugees fleeing the Holocaust.

Cazale, a small village in the hills about 30 kilometres (19 mi) away from Port-au-Prince, is considered the main center of population of the ethnic Polish community in Haiti; however, there are other villages with prominent Polish communities such as Les Cayes and Saint-Jean-du-Sud. Cazale has descendants of surviving members of Napoleon's Polish Legionnaires which were forced into combat by Napoleon but later joined the Haitian slaves during the Haitian Revolution. Some 400 to 500 of these Poles are believed to have settled in Haiti after the war. They were given special status as naturalized Haytians_{sic}(legally considered to have the same legal status as black people, who were then the only ones able to hold Haitian citizenship, despite being white) and full citizenship under the Haitian constitution by Jean-Jacques Dessalines, the first ruler of an independent Haiti.

== History ==
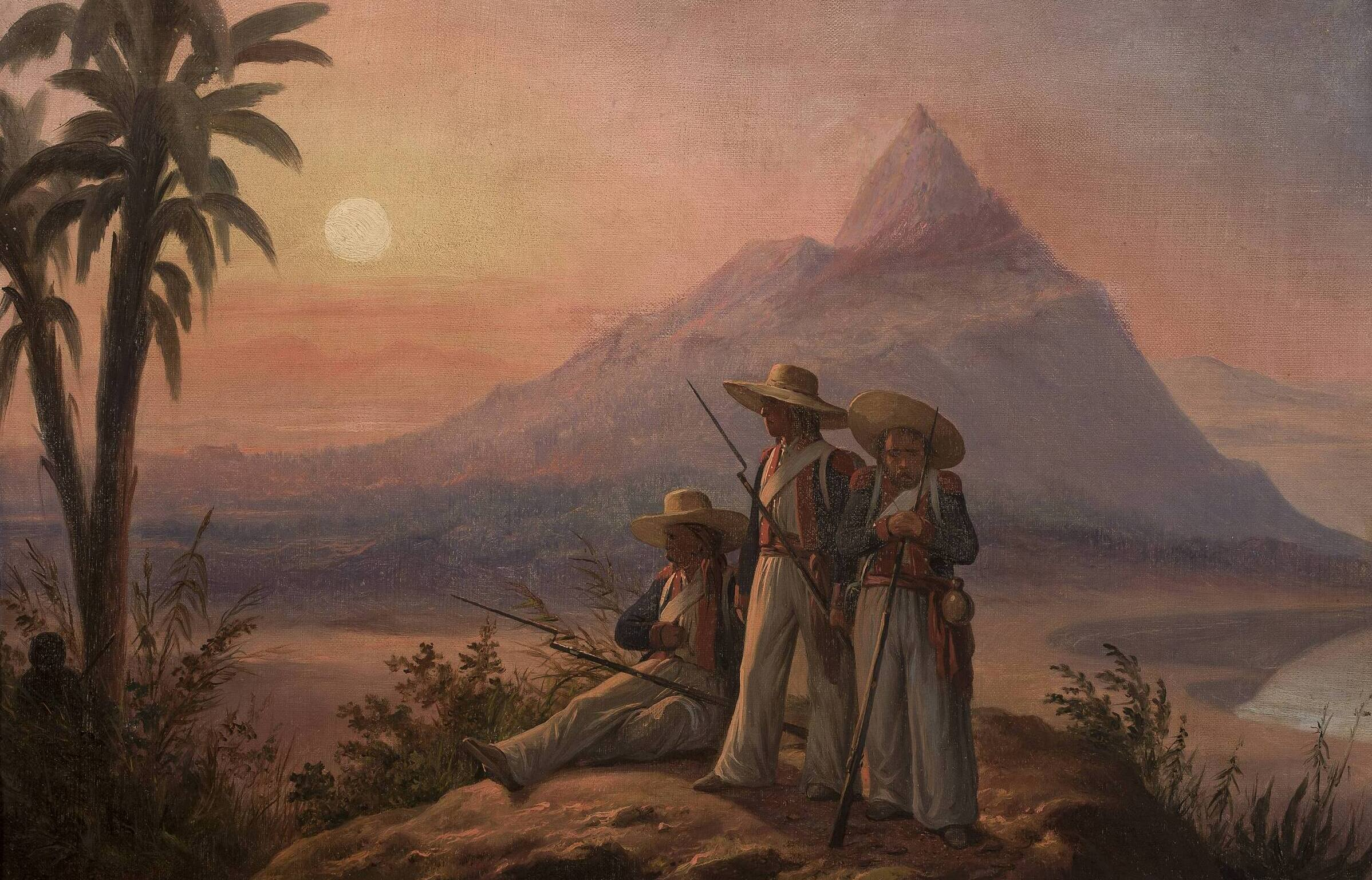
19th-century painting by January Suchodolski of Polish troops in Saint-Domingue

In May 1802, Napoleon dispatched the 3rd Polish Half-Brigade of around 5,200 men to join French forces in Saint-Domingue, who had recently retaken the colony from Toussaint Louverture. The Poles may have been hoping to receive French support in restoring Poland's independence from its occupiers—Prussia (later Germany), Russia, and Austria—which divided the country in the late 18th century. Some were told that there was a revolt of prisoners in Saint-Domingue. After the Poles arrived on 4 September, two days after their unit had been renamed the 113th Line Infantry Half-Brigade, they were quickly thrown into battle against Black rebels.

Both French and Polish soldiers in the colony experienced high mortality rates, with more troops dying of yellow fever than from being killed in action. Approximately 4,000 of the 5,200 Polish soldiers sent to Saint-Domingue died. Surviving Polish soldiers admired their opponents, and some 500 or so of them would eventually turn on the French army and joined the rebels. Out of those Polish soldiers who remained alongside the French, some intentionally failed to properly follow orders and refused to murder captured prisoners. The Poles would find kinship with the Haitians and many would come to believe that the former slaves were fighting for the same ideals of freedom and independence to which they, the Poles, aspired.

In return, the Poles would find support from the people of Haiti who sympathized with their shared mistreatment at the hands of the French. One fervent supporter of the Poles was Boisrond-Tonnerre. He would come to believe that both the Poles and the Haitians shared a history of fighting against tyranny. The shared value of liberty would lead Boisrond-Tonnerre to refer to the Poles as "the white negroes of Europe". Władysław Franciszek Jabłonowski, who was half-black, was one of the Polish generals but died of yellow fever soon after reaching Saint-Domingue. Polish soldiers are credited with contributing to the establishment of the world's first free black republic and the first independent Caribbean state.

After Haiti gained its independence, Dessalines recognized the Poles and spared them when he ordered the massacre of the establishment of slavery, which consisted of most French whites and many free blacks (mulattos) on the island. He granted the Poles classification as Noir (black), who constituted the new ruling class, and in the constitution granted them full Haitian citizenship. Cazale became a center of their community. Descendants of Polish-Haitians were peasants like the great majority of most of the residents on the island. Cazale was sometimes called home of Zalewski, as many locals believed that was the source of the name. Zalewski is a common name, and the Haitian Creole word for home (kay) may also have been part of its history.

Haiti's first head of state Jean-Jacques Dessalines would join Boisrond-Tonnerre in calling the Polish people "the White Negroes of Europe" in recognition of their plight. About 160 years later, in the mid-20th century, François Duvalier, the president of Haiti who was known for his black nationalist and Pan-African views, used the same concept of "European white Negroes" while referring to Polish people and glorifying their patriotism.

In 1983, Pope John Paul II visited Haiti. He mentioned how the Polish contributed to the slave rebellion leading to Haiti's independence. For this visit, two Catholic priests went up to Cazale and asked a number of Polish Haitians (though historical sources cannot agree on how many were invited) to dress up in "traditional clothes" and attend the Papal speech and associated ceremonies.

One of the most revered Polish religious symbols is the icon named the Black Madonna of Częstochowa. It is thought to have been absorbed by Haitian Voodoo as Erzulie, or Ezili Dantor. This image of a black Virgin Mary holding the dark-skinned Infant Jesus influenced the vision of one of the Haitian Loa spirits. It is thought that Polish soldiers may have carried her image to Haiti during the Napoleonic Era.

To this day, Polish Haitians are mixed race and often identified by such European features as blonde or lighter and straighter hair, light eyes, and facial features. Of course, there were other Europeans on the island, including some who arrived after the war. Initially most Poles settled in Cazale, La Vallée-de-Jacmel, Fond-des-Blancs, La Baleine, Port-Salut and Saint-Jean-du-Sud, where they lived as peasants, along with their Haitian wives and families.

== See also ==
- Polish Legions (Napoleonic period)

== Sources ==
- Rypson, Sebastian (2008), Being Poloné in Haiti: Origins, Survivals, Development, and Narrative Production of the Polish Presence in Haiti
