= Titanyen =

- Village
- Location in Haiti
- Coordinates: 18°42′44″N 72°20′38″W
- Country: Haiti
- Department: Ouest
- Arrondissement: Arcahaie
- Time zone: UTC-5 (UTC)

Titanyen is a village in Haiti, north of the capital, Port-au-Prince and some eight kilometres from Cabaret. It has been described as sparsely populated. Fields outside the settlement were chosen as the site of mass graves dug for victims of the 2010 Haiti earthquake.
