= Casale, Haiti =

Casale
- Village
- Location in Haiti
- Coordinates: 18.7990141°N 72.3853773°W
- Country: Haiti
- Department: Ouest
- Arrondissement: Arcahaie
- Elevation: 197 m (646 ft)

Population (1999)
  - Total: 21,424

Casale (also Cazale or Cazales) is a village in the Cabaret commune in the Arcahaie Arrondissement, in the Ouest department of Haiti.

It is located in a mountainous region around 30 kilometres (19 mi) from Port-au-Prince, the capital. It is the main population center of the Polish community in Haiti, called La Pologne (Poland). The name Cazale may have originated as kay Zalewski, meaning "home of Zalewski" (a popular Polish surname). The village is populated by descendants of Polish soldiers sent by Napoleon in 1802.

== See also ==
- Cabaret, for a list of other settlements in the commune.
