= Portlight Strategies =

Disaster relief nonprofit in the United States

Portlight Strategies, Inc. is a 501(c)(3) organization based in Johns Island, South Carolina, USA, focusing on hurricane and other disaster relief.

== History ==
Portlight was founded in 1997 as an organization to assist the disabled, by people living with disabilities. In 2008 through co-founder and chairman of the board Paul Timmons, Jr., Portlight assisted Patrick Pearson of Weather Underground in organizing relief for survivors of Hurricane Ike in Texas. This led to a lasting partnership with Weather Underground and a change in focus to disaster relief, particularly for "the underserved, unserved and forgotten people," those with disabilities and in rural areas. Portlight has since organized annual fundraising walkathons called relief walks in communities around the US, with Weather Underground as sponsoring partner. In 2010, the Christopher and Dana Reeve Foundation awarded Portlight a $21,500.00 grant in association with the US Centers for Disease Control and Prevention to pay for a deployable disaster relief module to assist disabled people in the first two weeks after a disaster.

== Assistance activities ==
Examples of disasters in which Portlight has partnered with individuals and groups to deliver assistance:

- 2005: Assistance to disabled survivors of Hurricane Katrina
- 2008: Over $500,000 worth of goods and services delivered to survivors of Hurricane Ike, and also pizza for residents of the devastated Bolivar Peninsula and relief workers and a Christmas party for residents of Bridge City, Texas.
- 2010: Aid to survivors of the 2010 Haiti earthquake, particularly durable medical equipment for the disabled, working with, among others, disability attorney Thomas K. Small
- 2011: Aid to survivors of the 2011 Super Outbreak in communities including Arab, Alabama; Cullman, Alabama; Ringgold, Georgia; Chattanooga, Tennessee; and Bristol, Virginia. Aid also given to survivors of the 2011 Joplin tornado and Hurricane Irene.
- 2017: Aid to survivors of Hurricane Maria. A shipment of generators and equipment for persons with disability was sent to the town of Aibonito, in partnership with the Siembra Tres Vidas Farm who coordinated with local farms to receive the generators.
