= Pase =

Pase or PASE may refer to:

- Pasé language, an extinct Arawakan language
- Prosopography of Anglo-Saxon England
- Portable Applications Solutions Environment
- Dunaújváros PASE, a Hungarian football club
- Accessibility without Exclusion (Partido Accesibilidad sin Exclusión), a political party in Costa Rica

== See also ==
- Passe (disambiguation)
