= Cabaret, Haiti =

Cabaret Kabarè
- Commune
- Haitian National Police station in Cabaret

- Location in Haiti
- Coordinates: 18°44′0″N 72°25′0″W
- Country: Haiti
- Department: Ouest
- Arrondissement: Arcahaie

Area
  - Total: 211.7 km^{2} (81.7 sq mi)

Population (2009)
  - Total: 62,063
  - Density: 293.2/km^{2} (759.3/sq mi)
- Time zone: UTC-05:00 (EST)
  - Summer (DST): UTC-04:00 (EDT)

Cabaret (French pronunciation: [kabaʁɛ]; Haitian Creole: Kabarè) is a commune in the Arcahaie Arrondissement, in the Ouest department of Haiti. In 2009, the commune had 62,063 inhabitants. During his dictatorship, François Duvalier renamed it Duvalierville (French pronunciation: [dyvaljevil]; Haitian Creole: Divalyevil); in 1961 a construction project was begun. Construction eventually stopped, but the name was kept until Duvalier's successor, his son Jean-Claude Duvalier, fled the country in 1986.

== Settlements ==
- Aubry
- Ballelle
- Bélac
- Cabaret
- Cameau
- Casale
- Deschapelle
- Fond Blanc
- Guldy Garret
- Lafiteau
- Lévêque
- Sophie
- Source Matelas
- Thomas
- Titanyen
