= Arcahaie =

Arcahaie: Lakayè
- Commune
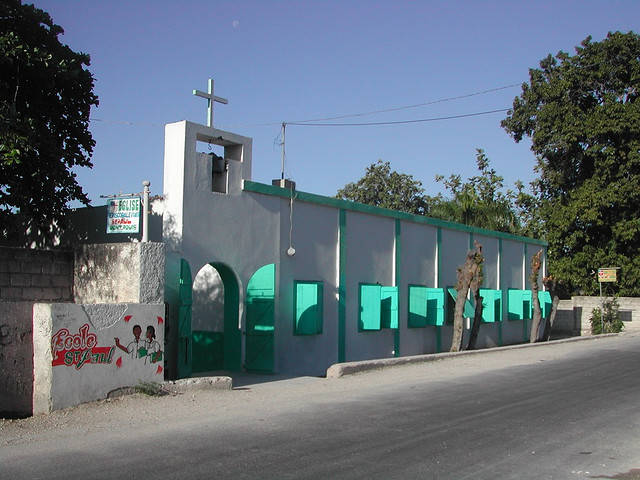

- Location in Haiti
- Coordinates: 18°46′0″N 72°31′0″W
- Country: Haiti
- Department: Ouest
- Arrondissement: Arcahaie

Area
  - Total: 408.73 km^{2} (157.81 sq mi)
- Elevation: 16 m (52 ft)

Population (March, 2015)
  - Total: 130,306
  - Density: 319/km^{2} (830/sq mi)
- Time zone: UTC-05:00 (EST)
  - Summer (DST): UTC-04:00 (EDT)

Arcahaie (French pronunciation: [aʁkaɛ]; Haitian Creole: Lakayè) is a commune in the Arcahaie Arrondissement, in the Ouest department of Haiti. In 2015, the commune had 130,306 inhabitants.

During the Gang war in Haiti on 10 October 2024, the town was attacked by the Taliban gang, causing an unspecified number of casualties.

== Settlements ==
- André
- Arcahaie
- Ca Pierre
- Corridor Gangny
- Couya
- Dasse
- Délice
- Douphine
- Giulbert
- Grande Place
- Grois Morne
- Justin
- Marotte
- Merotte
- Mitan
- Passe
- Petit Bois
- Saintard
- Saint Medard
- Ti Couloute
- Thomas Sourigol (Thomas)
