= Mitan, Gansu =

Mitan 糜滩镇
- Town
- Location in Gansu
- Coordinates: 36°35′33″N 104°40′34″E
- Country: People's Republic of China
- Province: Gansu
- Prefecture-level city: Baiyin
- County: Jingyuan County
- Time zone: UTC+8 (China Standard)

Mitan (simplified Chinese: 糜滩; traditional Chinese: 糜灘; pinyin: Mítān) is a town under the administration of Jingyuan County, Gansu, China. As of 2023, it administers the following eight villages:

- Xiatan Village (下滩村)
- Dushi Village (独石村)
- Nianwan Village (碾湾村)
- Guanlu Village (官路村)
- Qianjin Village (前进村)
- Shengli Village (胜利村)
- Wenhua Village (文化村)
- Wujiadachuan Village (武家大川村)
