= Arcahaie Arrondissement =

Coordinates: 18°46′08″N 72°30′46″W

Arcahaie Arrondissement Arrondissement d'Arcahaie Awondisman Lakayè
- Arrondissement
- Interactive map of Arcahaie Arrondissement
- Country: Haiti
- Department: Ouest

Area
  - Arrondissement: 611.09 km^{2} (235.94 sq mi)
  - Urban: 14.75 km^{2} (5.70 sq mi)
  - Rural: 596.34 km^{2} (230.25 sq mi)

Population (2015)
  - Arrondissement: 198,551
  - Density: 324.91/km^{2} (841.52/sq mi)
  - Urban: 139,629
  - Rural: 58,922
- Time zone: UTC-5 (Eastern)
- Postal code: HT64—
- Communes: 2
- Communal Sections: 10
- IHSI Code: 014

Arcahaie (Haitian Creole: Lakayè) is an arrondissement in the Ouest of Haiti. As of 2015, the population was 198,551 inhabitants. Postal codes in the Arcahaie Arrondissement start with the number 64.

The arrondissement consists of the following communes:

- Arcahaie
- Cabaret
