= Croix-des-Bouquets =

Commune in Haiti

Croix-des-Bouquets Kwadèboukè (Haitian Creole)
- Commune
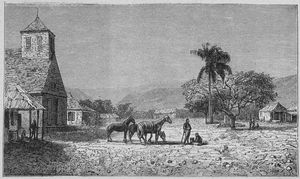
- Croix-des-Bouquets, 1881

- Location in Haiti
- Coordinates: 18°34′34″N 72°13′37″W
- Country: Haiti
- Department: Ouest
- Arrondissement: Croix-des-Bouquets

Area
  - Total: 5.46 km^{2} (2.11 sq mi)
- Elevation: 64 m (210 ft)

Population (2024 est.)
  - Total: 250,205
  - Rank: 12th in Haiti
  - Density: 45,800/km^{2} (119,000/sq mi)
- Demonym(s): crucien, crucienne

Croix-des-Bouquets (/ˌkrwɑː deɪ buːˈkeɪ, -bʊ-/, French pronunciation: [kʁwa de bukɛ]; Haitian Creole: Kwadèbouke or Kwadèboukè) is a commune in the Ouest department of Haiti. It is located 12.9 kilometers (8.0 mi) to the northeast of Haiti's capital city, Port-au-Prince. Originally located on the shore, it was relocated inland after the 1770 Port-au-Prince earthquake. With a population density of 52,000/km^{2} (130,000/sq mi), Croix-des-Bouquets is one of the most densely populated cities in the world.

Croix-des-Bouquets was founded in 1749 by Royal Decree. Legend has it that the city takes its name from a tradition that had the Spaniards passing to deposit bouquets of flowers at the foot of a large cross that was on the land where the city was built. Croix des Bouquets pursues a tradition of beauty through the sculpture of iron, and the village of Noailles is at the heart of this tradition specifically in ode to Haitian artist and sculptor Georges Liautaud.

== History ==
=== Pre-independence ===
On March 22, 1792, the city was the scene of one of the first battles of the Haitian Revolution. Men of color, under the leadership of Pinchinat, Beauvais, and Lambert, took up arms in 1700 in fighting for their political and civil rights.

In September 1791, after the Battle of Pernier, the royalist in La Croix-des-Bouquets made a concordat with the freedmen encamped at Trou-Caïman, which obliged the contractors to execute the national decrees in favor of the freedmen. On September 11, the freedmen came to camp at la Croix-des-Bouquets who signed a concordat with the freedmen in a church in the borough. On October 10, a deputation of the colonists of la Croix-des-Bouquets, sent by Hanus De Jumécourt, came to Port-Républicain, demanding the execution of this concordat.

In 1794, Halaou, the leader of African bands, rebels of the Cul-de-Sac Plain, was killed at Croix-des-Bouquets on February 9. There was a massacre of his group by the soldiers of the western region who occupied the village. Men of color entrenched themselves in the church. General Louis-Jacques Beauvais continued to occupy Croix-des-Bouquets until March 1793, after which British invasion forces occupied the city. Beauvais' troops returned to Jacmel.

In March 1793, Louis-Jacques Beauvais abandoned Croix-des-Bouquets and went to retreat at Gressier with 500 men. In April 1796, Toussaint Louverture, wanting to recapture Croix-des-Bouquets from the British, unsuccessfully attacked the outposts of the town. His cavalry defeated four squadrons of hussars commanded by the Count of Manoux. The British, after several charges, defeated the French, and drove them back to Grands-Bois.

After the occupation of Port-Républicain by the troops of General Charles LeClerc's expedition, General Jean Boudet learned, on February 9, 1802, of the appearance of Dessalines in the Cul-de-Sac Plain. There were immediately 2,000 men occupying Croix-des-Bouquets. On September 19, 1803, Jean-Jacques Dessalines took possession of Croix-des-Bouquets.

=== Post-independence ===
The first citizen who represented this commune in the first Chamber of Communes in 1817 was Plomba Ladouceur.

On January 11, 1859 President Fabre Geffrard's troops made their entry into resistance. During the Cacos Revolution in 1869, atrocities were committed in the name of President Sylvain Salnave. On January 15, 1870, Generals Saint-Lucien Emmanuel, Alfred Delva, Errié, Ulysses Obas and Pierre-Paul Saint-Jean, after being outlawed by decree, were arrested and executed at Croix-des-Bouquets. The Nordists seized Croix-des-Bouquets on June 28, 1889, after the evacuation of the village by General Canal Jeune, whose forces were insufficient.

Prior to the 2010 earthquake, the once crowded city had been restored. The streets had been cleaned up, wholesale merchants and other commerce had been relocated to Port-au-Prince. Retail commerce which once crowded sidewalks downtown now had a dedicated building. Also, the Cuban medical mission set up a field hospital in the region.

On 25 February 2021, hundreds of prisoners escaped from the Croix-des-Bouquets prison.

== Notable people ==
- Wyclef Jean, a Haitian rapper, musician and member of the trio the Fugees, was born in Croix-des-Bouquets, where he lived until he was nine years old.
- Junior Galette, a Haitian-American professional football player, was born in Croix-Des-Bouquets, where he lived until he was 8 years old.
- Michaëlle Jean, (French pronunciation: [mika.ɛl ʒɑ̃]; born September 6, 1957) is a Canadian stateswoman and former journalist who served as Governor General of Canada from 2005 to 2010, the 27th since Canadian Confederation. She is the first Haitian Canadian to hold this office.
- Garcelle Beauvais, (French pronunciation: [gaʁsɛl bovɛ]: born November 26, 1966)[1] is a Haitian-American actress, television personality, author, and former fashion model. She was born in Saint-Marc, Haiti,[1] to Marie-Claire Beauvais, a nurse, and Axel Jean Pierre, a lawyer. Best known for her starring roles in the sitcom The Jamie Foxx Show and the crime drama series NYPD Blue She also appeared in the films Coming to America (1988), Wild Wild West (1999) with Will Smith, White House Down (2013), and Spider-Man: Homecoming (2017). In 2020, Beauvais became a main cast member of the reality television series The Real Housewives of Beverly Hills. She also co-hosts the daytime talk show The Real alongside Adrienne Bailon, Loni Love, and Jeannie Mai.
- Jimmy Jean-Louis (born August 8, 1968) is a Haitian-American actor and producer best known for his role as "the Haitian" on the NBC television series Heroes.

== Education ==
One school close by is Anís Zunúzí Bahá'í School to the north east which opened its doors in 1980 which survived the 2010 Haiti earthquake and its staff were cooperating in relief efforts and sharing space and support with neighbors. A clinic was run at the school by a medical team from the United States and Canada. Currently it is a K-10 school and offers classes to transition from Haitian Creole to the French language but also a secondary language in English. The founders of Institution Chrétienne D'Haïti are seeking to build the Université Chrétienne D'Haïti here.

Another organization is the Haitian-American Caucus (HAC), which runs the École Shalom des Frères (Peace Be With You School of Brothers) in Michaud, a small community in Croix-des-Bouquets. The school is also known as the Alpha Academy and is funded in part by Alpha Phi Alpha fraternity. This school was established in 2003 and as of school year 2010-2011, 75 students were enrolled. HAC is only able to accept additional students through child education sponsorships and partnerships with other organizations. Students can be sponsored for $125 a year. M.A.D.E has joined HAC in providing 3 vegetarian meals a week for students. The school also offers community English courses taught by Haitians who went through previous versions of the course, and supplemented with the help of English-speaking volunteers.

== Sub-municipal units ==
Croix-des-Bouquets is divided into 10 communal sections; which in turn are subdivided into numerous settlements.

=== Communal sections ===
- Les Varreux 1
- Les Varreux 2
- Petit Bois 3
- Petit Bois 4
- Petit Bois 5
- Belle Fontaine 6
- Belle Fontaine 7
- Belle Fontaine 8
- Les Crochus
- Les Orangers

=== Settlements ===
- Bayard
- Beauget
- Belle Fontaine
- Bois Lame
- Boldine
- Boucan Greiffin
- Boutin
- Ca Damier
- Calalo
- Collier
- Couline Boucan Greffin
- Croix-des-Bouquets
- Delman
- Dessources
- Diablete
- Dieuron
- Dinger
- Dumay
- Gaman
- Grande Ravine
- Ham Pal
- Hatte Lathan
- Inviter
- Jong
- La Hatte Droullfard
- Le Jardin
- Mare Minerve
- Marin
- Mille Leux
- Moléare
- Mome Chauou
- Nan Cadastre
- Nan Carrotte
- Pâques
- Pizlatal
- Santo
- Savanne Blonde
- Sibert
- Saint Phard
- Tapon
- Telonge

== See also ==
- List of cities in Haiti
