= Croix-des-Bouquets (disambiguation) =

Croix-des-Bouquets is a commune in the Ouest department of Haiti.

Croix-des-Bouquets may also refer to:

- Croix-des-Bouquets, Ouest, a town in the commune
- Croix-des-Bouquets Arrondissement, an arrondissement which includes the commune
