= Carrefour Mambo =

- Village
- Location in Haiti
- Coordinates: 18.6654356°N 71.8848451°W
- Country: Haiti
- Department: Ouest
- Arrondissement: Croix-des-Bouquets
- Elevation: 1,122 m (3,681 ft)

Carrefour Mambo is a village in the Cornillon commune in the Croix-des-Bouquets Arrondissement, in the Ouest department of Haiti.

== See also ==
- Cornillon, for a list of other settlements in the commune.
