= Nan l'Étang =

- Village
- Location in Haiti
- Coordinates: 18.6795546°N 71.8879112°W
- Country: Haiti
- Department: Ouest
- Arrondissement: Croix-des-Bouquets
- Elevation: 859 m (2,818 ft)

Nan l'Étang is a village in the Cornillon commune of the Croix-des-Bouquets Arrondissement, in the Ouest department of Haiti.

== See also ==
- Cornillon, for a list of other settlements in the commune.
