= Gaman, Haiti =

Gaman
- Village
- Location in Haiti
- Coordinates: 18.6816379°N 71.9824873°W
- Country: Haiti
- Department: Ouest
- Arrondissement: Croix-des-Bouquets
- Elevation: 116 m (381 ft)

Gaman is a village in the Croix-des-Bouquets commune of the Croix-des-Bouquets Arrondissement, in the Ouest department of Haiti.

== See also ==
- Croix-des-Bouquets, for a list of other settlements in the commune.
