= Savane Perrin =

- Rural settlement
- Location in Haiti
- Coordinates: 18.7087475°N 71.990667°W
- Country: Haiti
- Department: Ouest
- Arrondissement: Croix-des-Bouquets
- Elevation: 1,044 m (3,425 ft)

Savane Perrin is a rural settlement in the Cornillon commune in the Croix-des-Bouquets Arrondissement in the Ouest department of Haiti.

== See also ==
- Cornillon, for a list of other settlements in the commune.
