= Grande Ravine =

- Communal section
- Location in Haiti
- Coordinates: 18.3621118°N 72.1451139°W
- Country: Haiti
- Department: Ouest
- Arrondissement: Croix-des-Bouquets
- Elevation: 1,118 m (3,668 ft)

Grande Ravine (French pronunciation: [ɡʁɑ̃d ʁavin]) is a communal section in the Croix-des-Bouquets commune of the Croix-des-Bouquets Arrondissement, in the Ouest department of Haiti.

== See also ==
- Croix-des-Bouquets, for a list of other settlements in the commune.
