= Rato =

- Village
- Location in Haiti
- Coordinates: 18.6669964°N 71.9180386°W
- Country: Haiti
- Department: Ouest
- Arrondissement: Croix-des-Bouquets
- Elevation: 1,058 m (3,471 ft)

Rato is a village in the Cornillon commune in the Croix-des-Bouquets Arrondissement, Ouest department of Haiti.

== See also ==
- Cornillon, for a list of other settlements in the commune.
