= Saint-Pierre, Haiti =

Saint-Pierre
- Village
- Location in Haiti
- Coordinates: 18°39′53″N 71°51′34″W
- Country: Haiti
- Department: Ouest
- Arrondissement: Croix-des-Bouquets
- Elevation: 923 m (3,028 ft)
- Time zone: UTC-05:00 (EST)
  - Summer (DST): UTC-04:00 (EDT)

Saint-Pierre is a village in the Cornillon commune in the Croix-des-Bouquets Arrondissement in the Ouest department of Haiti.

== See also ==
- Cornillon, for a list of other settlements in the commune.
