= Siege of Port-au-Prince (1793) =

Battle of the Haitian Revolution

- Part of the Haitian Revolution
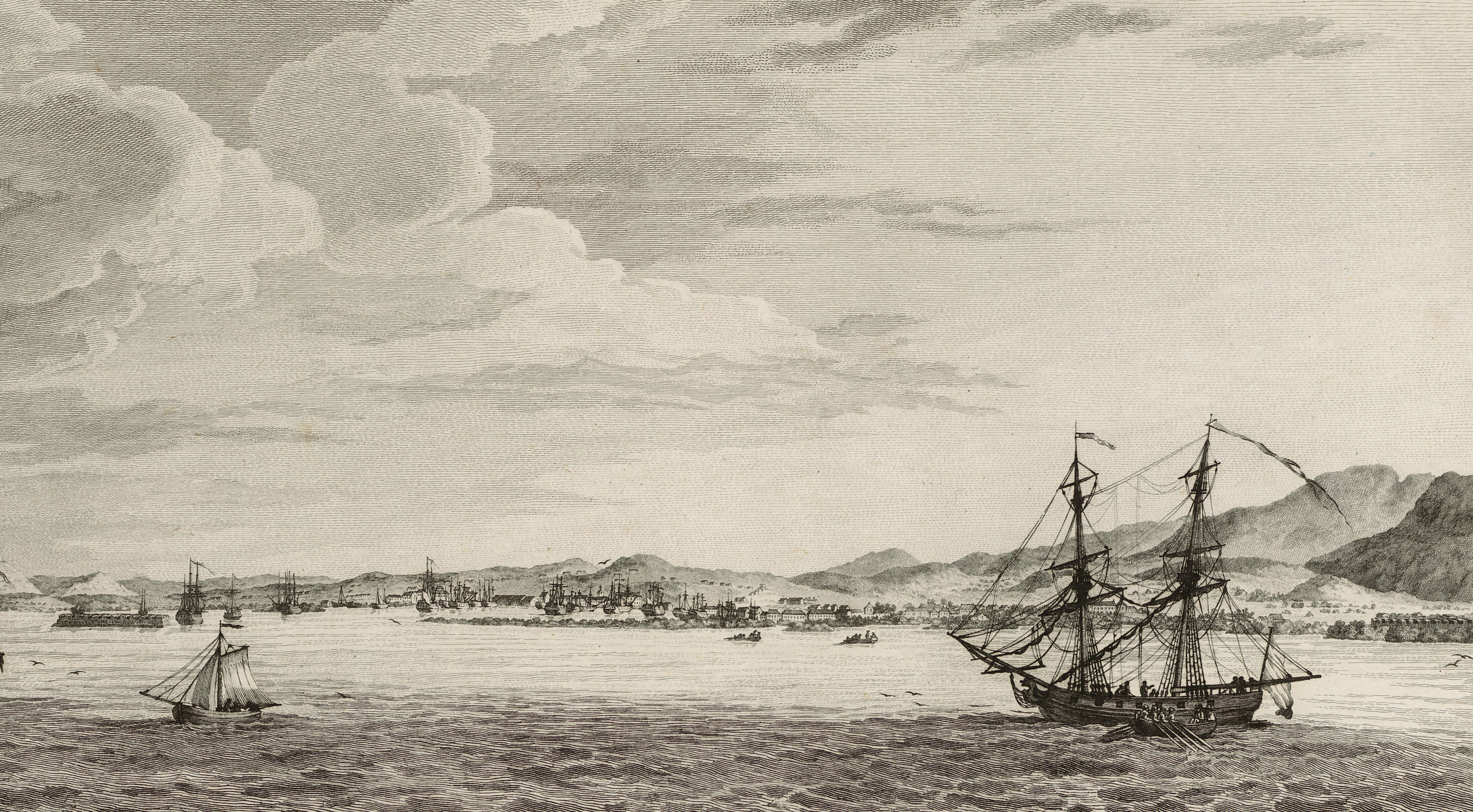
- View of Port-au-Prince by Nicolas Pérignon, 1791
Date	12–14 April 1793
Location	Port-au-Prince, Haiti
Result	French Republican victory

Belligerents
French Republic	Insurgents

Commanders and leaders
Léger-Félicité Sonthonax; Étienne Polverel; Louis-Jacques Beauvais	Borel

Strength
1,350 men	1,800 men

Casualties and losses
Unknown	Unknown

The siege of Port-au-Prince took place in April 1793 during the Haitian Revolution.

== Rebellion of the colonists ==
On 25 January 1793, the colonists, led by Borel, revolt against the commissioners Sonthonax and Polverel. The royalist "grands blancs" colonists and wealthy slave owners and the "petites blancs", modest or poor, or formerly, Republican colonists, united in their common opposition to mulattoes and free colored people. The colonists armed their slaves, joined forces with the soldiers of the Artois Regiment and made themselves masters of Port-au-Prince. The insurgents then sent a letter to London declaring themselves ready to pass under the suzerainty of the Kingdom of Great Britain in exchange for the conservation of their laws.

== Siege ==
Troops loyal to the commissioners commanded by generals Lassale, a European, and Beauvais, a mulatto, then laid siege to Port-au-Prince. For their part, the representatives Sonthonax and Polverel established their base at the port of Saint-Marc, took command of the navy and attacked from the sea. On 12 April the forces of the commissioners launched a general attack by sea and land. The commissioners' ship was badly damaged by rebel cannons and a fire broke out, but it was extinguished.

Intensely bombarded with 4,000 to 5,000 cannonballs, Port-au-Prince capitulated on 14 April 1793. Borel, the leader of the insurgents, fled to Jamaica, while his slaves were disarmed and returned to their plantations.

== Bibliography ==
- Bell, Madison Smartt (2007). Toussaint Louverture. Actes Sud.
- Forsdick, Charles; Høgsbjerg, Christian (2017). Toussaint Louverture: A Black Jacobin in the Age of Revolutions. London: Pluto Press. ISBN 978-0-7453-3515-5.
- Geggus, David Patrick (2002). Haitian Revolutionary Studies. Bloomington: Indiana University Press. ISBN 9780253109262.
- Madiou, Thomas (1847). Histoire d'Haïti, Tome I (in French).
- Schœlcher, Victor (1982) [1889]. Vie de Toussaint Louverture (in French). Éditions Karthala.
