= Parc Dubois =

- Village
- Location in Haiti
- Coordinates: 18.6458121°N 71.8504867°W
- Country: Haiti
- Department: Ouest
- Arrondissement: Croix-des-Bouquets
- Elevation: 1,137 m (3,730 ft)

Parc Dubois (French pronunciation: [paʁk dybwa]) is a village in the Cornillon commune of the Croix-des-Bouquets Arrondissement, in the Ouest department of Haiti. it lies on the Dominican Republic–Haiti border.

== See also ==
- Cornillon, for a list of other settlements in the commune.
