= Inviter =

- Village
- Location in Haiti
- Coordinates: 18.3753206°N 72.1633448°W
- Country: Haiti
- Department: Ouest
- Arrondissement: Croix-des-Bouquets
- Elevation: 1,033 m (3,389 ft)

Inviter is a village in the Croix-des-Bouquets commune of the Croix-des-Bouquets Arrondissement, in the Ouest department of Haiti.

== See also ==
- Croix-des-Bouquets, for a list of other settlements in the commune.
