= Saint Phard =

- Village
- Location in Haiti
- Coordinates: 18°44′01″N 72°17′54″W
- Country: Haiti
- Department: Ouest
- Arrondissement: Croix-des-Bouquets
- Elevation: 461 m (1,512 ft)
- Time zone: UTC-05:00 (EST)
  - Summer (DST): UTC-04:00 (EDT)

Saint Phard is a village in the Croix-des-Bouquets (within the Croix-des-Bouquets Arrondissement) of the Ouest department of Haiti.

== See also ==
- Croix-des-Bouquets, for a list of other settlements in the commune.
