= Dieuron =

- Village
- Location in Haiti
- Coordinates: 18°35′20″N 72°11′21″W
- Country: Haiti
- Department: Ouest
- Arrondissement: Croix-des-Bouquets
- Elevation: 51 m (167 ft)

Dieuron is a village in the Croix-des-Bouquets commune in the Croix-des-Bouquets Arrondissement, in the Ouest department of Haiti.

== See also ==
- Croix-des-Bouquets, for a list of other settlements in the commune.
