= Bayard, Haiti =

Bayard
- Village
- Location in Haiti
- Coordinates: 18.4409269°N 72.1526214°W
- Country: Haiti
- Department: Ouest
- Arrondissement: Croix-des-Bouquets
- Elevation: 1,049 m (3,442 ft)

Bayard is a village in the Croix-des-Bouquets commune in the Ouest department of Haiti.

== See also ==
- Croix-des-Bouquets, for a list of other settlements in the commune.
