= Boucan Greiffin =

- Village
- Location in Haiti
- Coordinates: 18.4222497°N 72.0968127°W
- Country: Haiti
- Department: Ouest
- Arrondissement: Croix-des-Bouquets
- Elevation: 1,105 m (3,625 ft)

Boucan Greiffin is a village in the Croix-des-Bouquets commune in the Croix-des-Bouquets Arrondissement, in the Ouest department of Haiti.

== See also ==
- Croix-des-Bouquets, for a list of other settlements in the commune.
