= Modeste, Haiti =

Modeste
- Village
- Location in Haiti
- Coordinates: 18.6816379°N 71.9824873°W
- Country: Haiti
- Department: Ouest
- Arrondissement: Croix-des-Bouquets
- Elevation: 795 m (2,608 ft)

Modeste is a village in the Cornillon commune in the Croix-des-Bouquets Arrondissement in the Ouest department of Haiti.

== See also ==
- Cornillon, for a list of other settlements in the commune.
