= Marin, Haiti =

Marin
- Village
- Location in Haiti
- Coordinates: 18°36′44″N 72°17′12″W
- Country: Haiti
- Department: Ouest
- Arrondissement: Croix-des-Bouquets
- Elevation: 20 m (66 ft)
- Time zone: UTC-05:00 (EST)
  - Summer (DST): UTC-04:00 (EDT)

Marin is a village in the Croix-des-Bouquets commune in the Croix-des-Bouquets Arrondissement in the Ouest department of Haiti. Marin is notable for its vibrant local metal art scene, which features intricate sculptures made from recycled steel drums, a unique tradition in Haiti. This reflects the artisanal craftsmanship for which the neighboring Croix-des-Bouquets area is famous, and Marin shares in this cultural identity.

== See also ==
- Croix-des-Bouquets, for a list of other settlements in the commune.
