= Belle Fontaine, Haiti =

Belle Fontaine
- Communal section
- Location in Haiti
- Coordinates: 18.4506433°N 72.1288406°W
- Country: Haiti
- Department: Ouest
- Arrondissement: Croix-des-Bouquets
- Elevation: 725 m (2,379 ft)

Belle Fontaine (French pronunciation: [bɛl fɔ̃tɛn]) is a communal section in the Croix-des-Bouquets commune in the Croix-des-Bouquets Arrondissement, in the Ouest department of Haiti.

== See also ==
- Croix-des-Bouquets, for a list of other settlements in the commune.
