= Savanne Blonde =

- Village
- Location in Haiti
- Coordinates: 18.5788488°N 72.2310144°W
- Country: Haiti
- Department: Ouest
- Arrondissement: Croix-des-Bouquets
- Elevation: 62 m (203 ft)

Savanne Blonde is a village in the Croix-des-Bouquets commune in the Croix-des-Bouquets Arrondissement in the Ouest department of Haiti.

== See also ==
- Croix-des-Bouquets, for a list of other settlements in the commune.
