= Ca Élie =

- Village
- Location in Haiti
- Coordinates: 18.6795928°N 72.0461586°W
- Country: Haiti
- Department: Ouest
- Arrondissement: Croix-des-Bouquets
- Elevation: 444 m (1,457 ft)

Ca Élie is a village in the Cornillon commune in the Croix-des-Bouquets Arrondissement, in the Ouest department of Haiti.

== See also ==
- Cornillon, for a list of other settlements in the commune.
