= Ditto, Haiti =

Ditto
- Rural settlement
- Location in Haiti
- Coordinates: 18°27′N 72°10′W
- Country: Haiti
- Department: Ouest
- Arrondissement: Port-au-Prince

Ditto is a rural settlement in the Port-au-Prince Arrondissement, in the Ouest department of Haiti.

== See also ==
- Kenscoff
