= Battle of Croix-des-Bouquets =

1792 conflict in Haiti

- Part of the Haitian Revolution
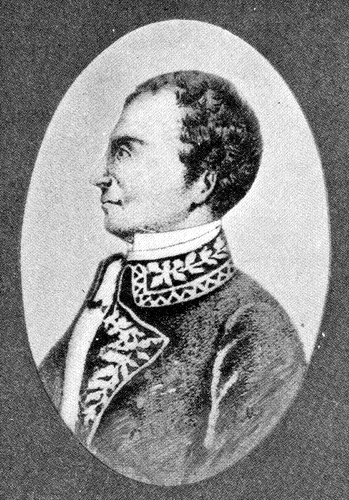
- André Rigaud, the Haitian commander of the battle
Date	22 March 1792
Location	Croix-des-Bouquets, Haiti
Result	Victory of the Mulattoes

Belligerents
French colony of Saint-Domingue	Insurgent black slaves Mulattoes and free colored people

Commanders and leaders
Unknown	André Rigaud

Casualties and losses
100 deaths	1,200 deaths

The Battle of Croix-des-Bouquets took place during the Haitian Revolution.

== Battle ==
Forced to flee from Port-au-Prince, the rebel force of free people of color under Louis-Jacques Beauvais and André Rigaud withdrew to Croix-des-Bouquets, where they reformed. The arrival of the rebel force at Croix-des-Bouquets led to a slave rebellion in the Plain of the Cul-de-Sac; armed only with improvised weapons such as knives, spears and hoes, the rebels, led by a 21-year old slave named Yacinth, joined Beauvais and Rigaud's force.

The French colonial authorities made plans to destroy the rebels. On March 22, infantrymen and dragoons of the Port-au-Prince National Guard reinforced by detachments of the 9th and 48th Line Infantry Regiments went to confront the rebels. The fight began at La Croix-des-Bouquets.

The French writer Victor Schœlcher of the nineteenth century, in his book Vie de Toussaint Louverture described this episode: "The blacks brought by Yacinthe, almost all Africans, were scarcely armed with knives, pikes, hoes, and iron poles; but fanaticized by their wizards, convinced that they would be resurrected in Africa if they were killed, they threw themselves on the bayonets without caring for the fires of platoons which decimated them. They clung to the horses of the dragoons they dismounted by being slashed. Yacinthe, with a bull's tail in her hand, roamed their ranks, shouting that she was chasing death. He rushed to their heads, fighting bullets and grape shots, which seemed to respect his talisman. Men were seen rushing on the guns, holding them hugged to prevent them from leaving and being killed without letting go. Others were found thrusting their arms into the mouths of the pieces to tear out the balls and call their comrades, shouting: 'Come, come; we hold them'. The pieces were leaving and their members were carried away".

Outnumbered, the French were forced to retreat in disorder back to Port-au-Prince. According to Victor Schoelcher, who relied on the writings of Thomas Madiou and François Joseph Pamphile de Lacroix, the French lost more than 100 soldiers and the rebels lost 1,200.

== Bibliography ==
- Geggus, David Patrick (2002). Haitian Revolutionary Studies. Bloomington: Indiana University Press. ISBN 9780253109262.
- Madiou, Thomas (1847). Histoire d'Haïti, Tome I (in French).
- Schœlcher, Victor (1982) [1889]. Vie de Toussaint Louverture (in French). Éditions Karthala.
