= Boutin, Haiti =

Boutin
- Village
- Location in Haiti
- Coordinates: 18°36′26″N 72°09′28″W
- Country: Haiti
- Department: Ouest
- Arrondissement: Croix-des-Bouquets
- Elevation: 33 m (108 ft)
- Time zone: UTC-05:00 (EST)
  - Summer (DST): UTC-04:00 (EDT)

Boutin is a village in the Croix-des-Bouquets commune in the Croix-des-Bouquets Arrondissement, in the Ouest department of Haiti.

== See also ==
- Croix-des-Bouquets, for a list of other settlements in the commune.
