= Ditto =

Ditto may refer to:

== Arts and entertainment ==
- Ditto (convention), an annual science fiction fanzine convention
- Ditto (1937 film), starring Buster Keaton
- Ditto (2000 film), a South Korean film
  - Ditto (2022 film), a South Korean remake
- "Ditto" (song), by NewJeans
- "Ditto", a song on the 2006 album Cassie by Cassie
- "Ditto", a song on the 2025 mixtape My Face Hurts from Smiling by Lizzo
- Ditto (Ben 10), a character in the animated series
- Ditto (Pokémon), a Pokémon species
- Ditto, a fictional character in the comic strip Hi and Lois

== Businesses ==
- Ditto Music, an online music distribution company
- DITTO, a software company for eyewear companies
- Ditto Bank, a former subsidiary of Finablr

== People ==
- Beth Ditto (born 1981), singer of the band Gossip
- J. Kane Ditto (born 1944), former mayor of Jackson, Mississippi, US
- Jessica Ditto (fl. from 2004), American Republican staffer
- Richard Ditto (born 1934/35), American politician
- Ditto Ram (1915–1944), Indian soldier awarded the George Cross
- Ditto Sarmiento (Abraham Sarmiento Jr., 1950–1977), Filipino student journalist

== Other uses ==
- Ditto mark ("), a symbol indicating repetition
- Ditto, Ouest, a place in Haiti
- Ditto machine, a US brand of spirit duplicator
- Ditto (drive), a computer data storage system
- Ditto (horse) (1800–1821), a racehorse
- Ditto suit, a precursor of the lounge suit
- DittoTV, a former video-on-demand platform

== See also ==
- Didi & Ditto, an edutainment software series
