= Terrelonge =

Terrelonge is a Jamaican surname.

== List of people with the surname ==
- Alando Terrelonge, Jamaican politician and government minister
- Clive Terrelonge (born 1969), Jamaican former track and field athlete and coach

== See also ==
- Telonge, Haitian village
