= Tabarre =

Tabarre Taba
- Commune
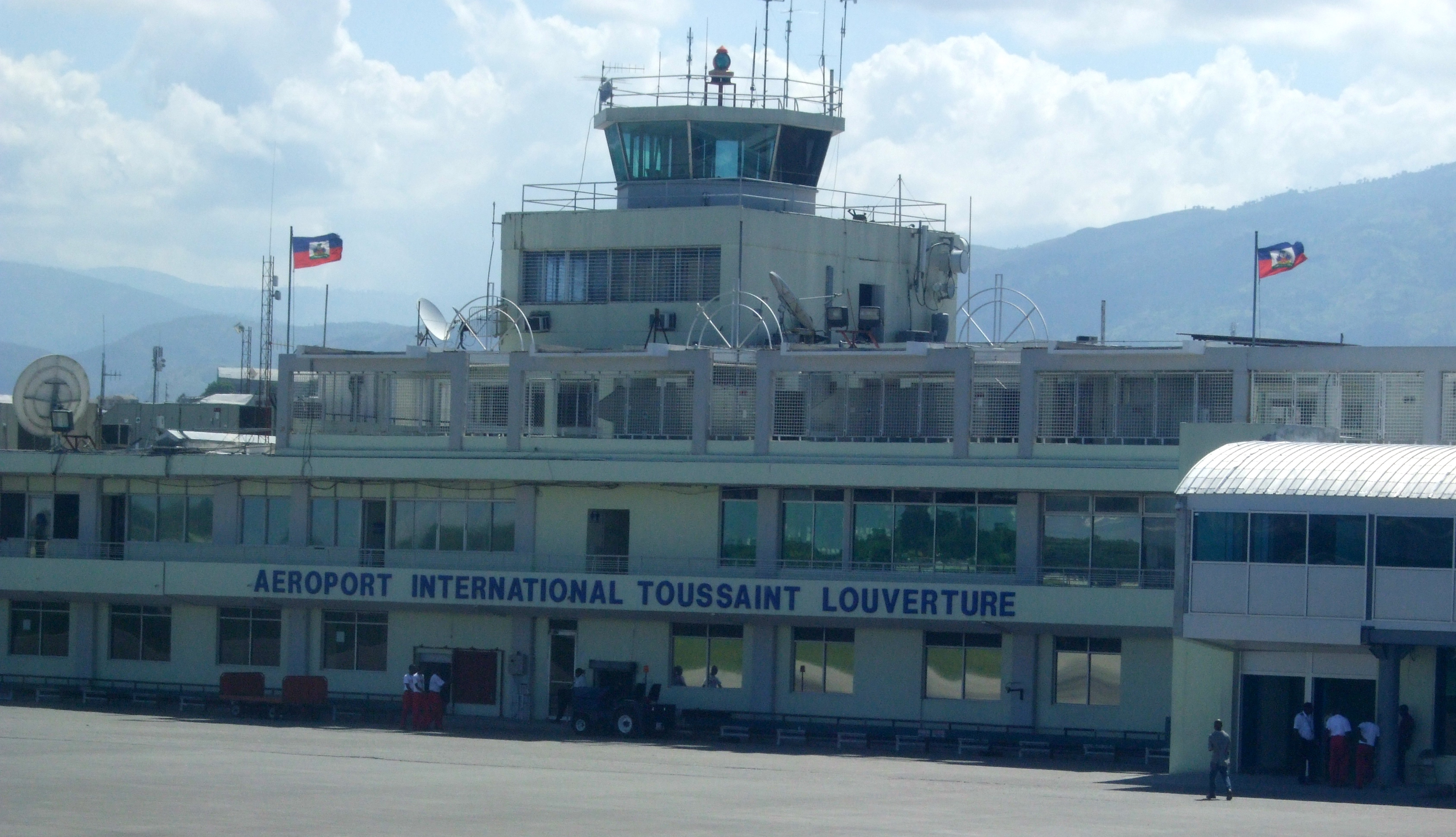

- Location in Haiti
- Coordinates: 18°35′0″N 72°16′0″W
- Country: Haiti
- Department: Ouest
- Arrondissement: Port-au-Prince

Area
  - Total: 24.47 km^{2} (9.45 sq mi)
- Elevation: 48 m (157 ft)

Population (2015 Est.)
  - Total: 130,283
  - Density: 5,324/km^{2} (13,790/sq mi)
- Time zone: UTC-05:00 (EST)
  - Summer (DST): UTC-04:00 (EDT)
- Website: mairiedetabarre.ht

Tabarre (French pronunciation: [tabaʁ]; Haitian Creole: Taba) is a commune in the Port-au-Prince Arrondissement, in the Ouest department of Haiti. It is part of the urbanized area of Port-au-Prince, just northeast of the main part of the city, and next to Delmas.

The Toussaint Louverture International Airport is located in the commune, as well as the Autorité Aéroportuaire Nationale government agency (not to be confused with Autorité Portuaire Nationale agency. It is located 8 km northeast of the capital.

== See also ==
- List of cities in Haiti
