= Carrefour, Haiti =

Residential commune in Ouest, Haiti

Commune of Carrefour Kafou (Haitian Creole)
- Commune
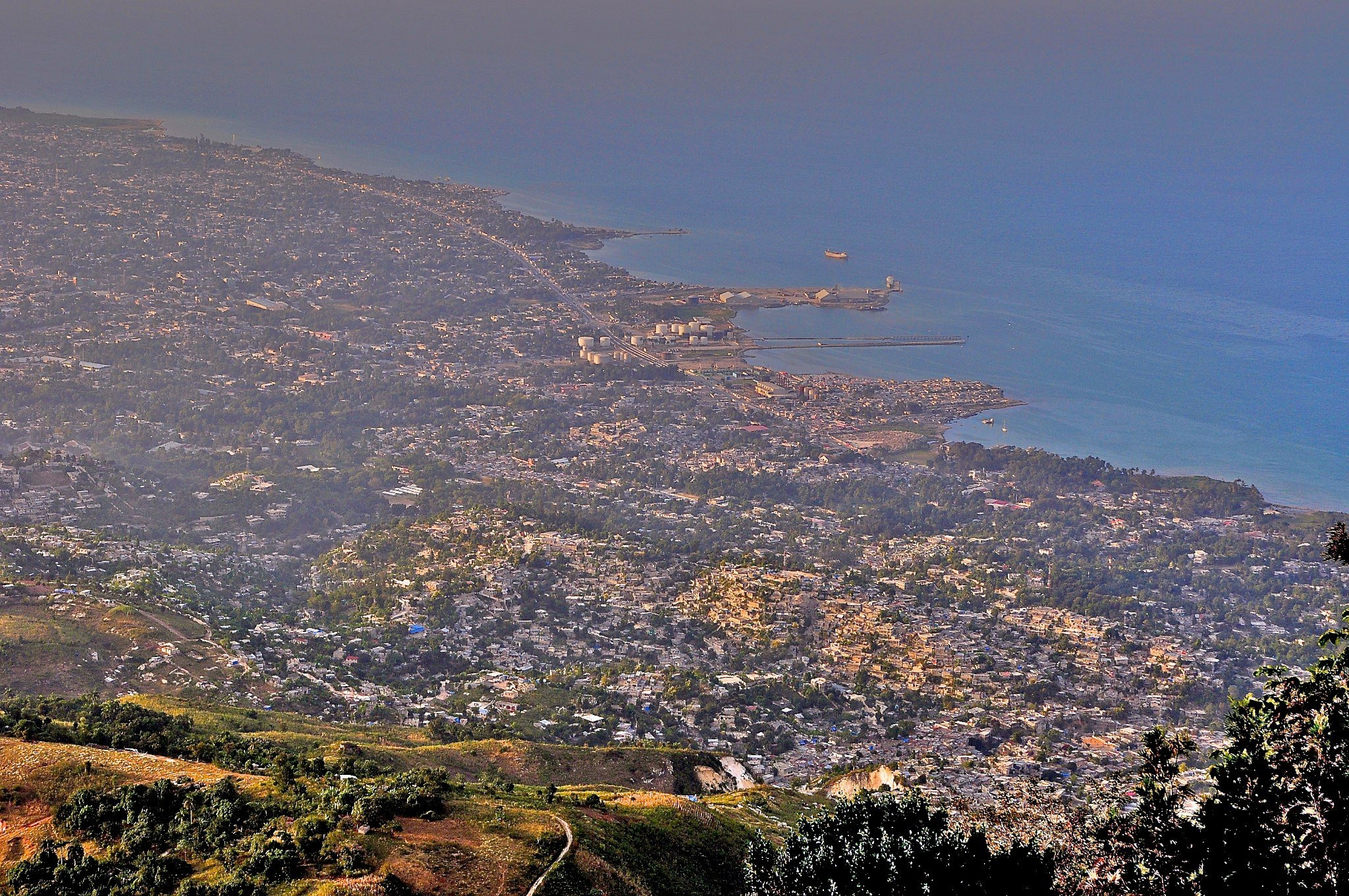
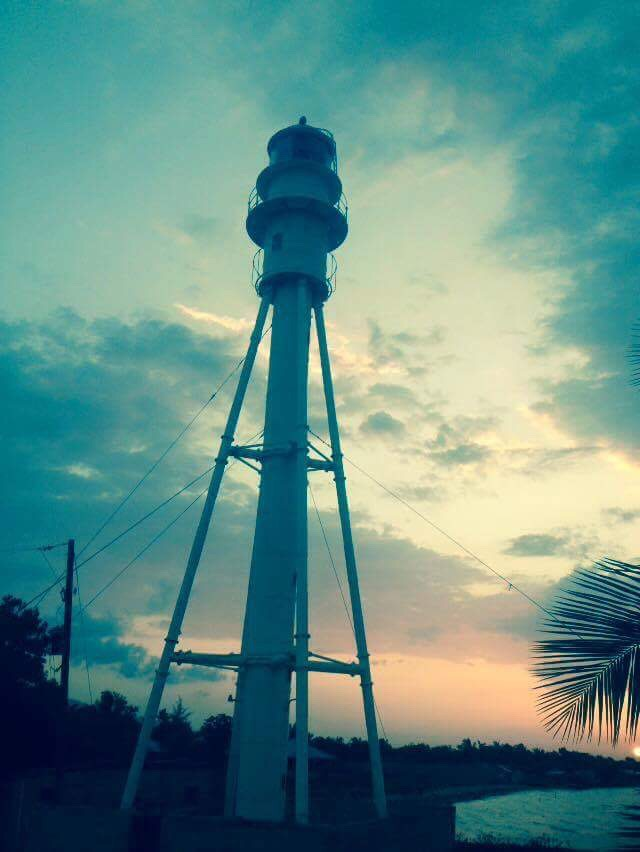
- Motto: Amour, Paix, Progrès
- Location in Haiti
- Coordinates: 18°32′0″N 72°24′0″W
- Country: Haiti
- Department: Ouest
- Arrondissement: Port-au-Prince

Government
  - Type: Mayor–council
  - Mayor: Jude Edouard Pierre (VP)
  - Council: Carrefour City Council

Area
  - Total: 165.16 km^{2} (63.77 sq mi)
- Elevation: 39 m (128 ft)

Population (2015 Est.)
  - Total: 511,345
  - Density: 3,096/km^{2} (8,020/sq mi)
- Demonym: Carrefourrois(e)
- Zip code: HT 6130
- Website: mairiedecarrefour.com

Carrefour (French pronunciation: [kaʁfuʁ]; Haitian Creole: Kafou, pronounced [kafu], meaning Crossroads in English) is a largely residential commune in the Port-au-Prince Arrondissement, in the Ouest department of Haiti. Port-au-Prince has a population of 1,234,742 while the commune has a population of 501,768.

Before the exile of Jean-Claude Duvalier, Carrefour was viewed as a Haitian tourist destination.

== History ==
The location that would become Carrefour was originally a military post in the borough of Port-au-Prince. In March 1795, Louis-Jacques Beauvais and André Rigaud defeated English troops that were occupying the area.

On 1 May 1813, President Alexandre Pétion founded the village of Carrefour. Following a plan drawn up by surveyor Louis Rigaud, the village was to have 20 islets and 161 sites.

The former private residence of President Pétion, now the home of the National School of Thor, is in Carrefour. This location holds important historical significance as it is tied to one of the founding fathers of Haiti.

In 1869, the Cacos, in rebellion against the government of Sylvain Salnave, occupied Carrefour and attacked the fort of Bizoton but were not able to hold it. The Piquets of the south attacked them from behind and forced them to evacuate the military post.

On 20 August 1889, at the height of the insurrection of the northerners against President Légitime, the vanguard of the Army of the South came to take up a position at Carrefour. On 21 August, the day before Légitime's departure, General Justin Carrie fought two battles and was defeated at Bizoton.

In one of his development projects, President François Denys Légitime planned to link Carrefour to Port-au-Prince by a line of steamboats along the coast to Leogane.

Carrefour was elevated to the rank of commune on 15 December 1982.

== Geography ==
The commune of Carrefour is at the crossroads through which thousands of cars, vans, and trucks must pass to go to a part of the department of the West, the departments of the Southeast, the Nippes, the South, and the Grande–Anse. Because of its geographical location and its natural environment, the urban and rural areas of the commune of Carrefour have economic and tourist potential.

For more than a century and a half, Carrefour has never been urbanized as its founders wished. Its agricultural vocation took precedence over its urbanization. The original settlement provided the surrounding settlements (Monrepos, Lamentin, Mahotière, Thor, Brochette, Mariani) and the various communal sections supplied the villagers of Carrefour and the town of Port-au-Prince with agricultural products such as rice, cane sugar, cotton, fruit, vegetables, food, coffee, etc. It was not until the mid-1970s that the anarchic urbanization of the area began. This "urbanization" coincides with the liquidation of the main houses by the large landowners of Carrefour.

Carrefour, together with Port-au-Prince, Petion-Ville, Kenscoff, Gressier, and Delmas, form the borough of Port-au-Prince. The rural area, which is fairly extensive, comprises the following 13 communal sections: Bizoton, Thor, Froide River, Corail Thor, Morne-à-Chandelle, Platon Dufresney, Taillefer, Procy, Bouvier, Coupeau, Laval, Berly and Malanga.

The topography of Carrefour is not quite different from that of Port-au-Prince. Like the latter, the municipality of Carrefour rises to the bottom of the Gulf of Gonave. It includes a mountainous part including the hills Malanga, Chandelle, Boyer, Froide River, Dufréné, and Corail Thor.

Its geographical limits extend from the east to the north, from the junction of Fontamara 43 with the coastline until it meets Port-au-Prince Bay and extends along this coast until it meets with the Mariani ravine. From the northwest, they turn south to the limit of the 12th Section of Morne-à-Bateau, the 23rd Section of the Parks, and the 8th Section of Beau-Séjour de la as of Léogâne. From there, they re-join the boundaries of the 7th Section, Great River, 4th Section, Gosseline which belongs to the commune of Jacmel, and the 2nd Section, Nouvelle-Tourraine, and the 20th Section, Bongars, of the commune of Kenscoff. They again rejoin Fontamara 43 by the South-South-East trajectory of the 8th Section, Martissant, of the commune of Port-au-Prince. The coordinates of the municipality are located on the one hand between 72°22' and 72°27' west longitude and on the other hand between 18°30' and 18°35' north latitude. Its area is estimated at 190 km^{2}.

As far as hydrography is concerned, the Froide River, one of the most important watercourses in the municipality, flows through the Communal Sections of Plato Dufresney and continues to the Pond Section of the commune Of Petion-Ville. Then the river of Chauffard irrigates the houses of the communal section Procy, that of Bengas at the level of Kenscoff, and that of Momance or Grande-Rivière, between the communal sections of Procy and Laval. Among the less important rivers: are the Grandin River, the Morel, and Time-Perdu gullies.

On the demographic level, the commune of Carrefour has a population of more than 500,000 inhabitants. However, it remains extremely difficult to have more or less reliable statistics on the population of Carrefour. According to the 1982 census, Carrefour had a population of 129,470 people; the 2003 census lists a population of 373,916 inhabitants. Based on 4.24%, the annual growth rate of its population, today, Carrefour would have a population of 460,251 inhabitants.

=== List of communal sections of Carrefour ===
The communal section (French: section communale, formerly section rurale) is the smallest administrative division in Haiti.

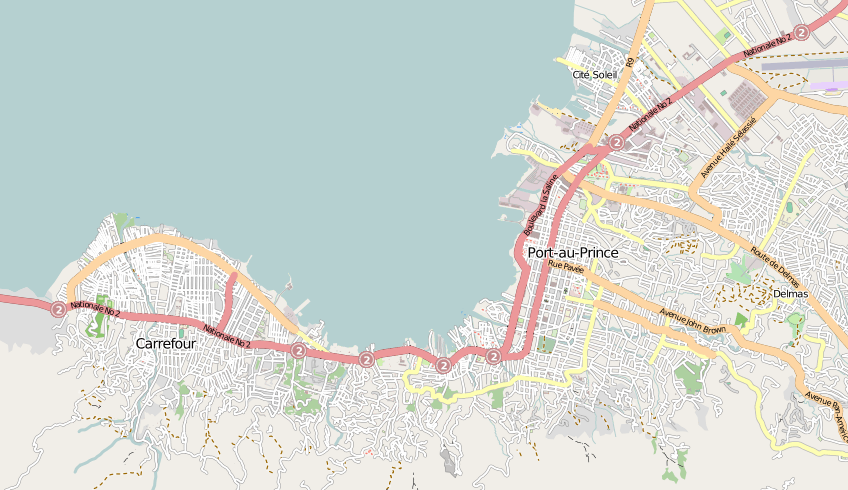
Carrefour, Cité Soleil, Delmas, Port-au-Prince, aboutin relation to one another.

- Morne Chandelle
- Platon Dufréné
- Taïfer
- Procy
- Coupeau
- Bouvier
- Lavalle
- Berly
- Bizoton
- Thor
- Rivière Froide
- Malanga
- Corail Thor

Postal Code of Carrefour:

- HT6130: Carrefour
- HT6131: Bizoton
- HT6132: Diquini, Thor
- HT6133: Côte-Page, Mahotière
- HT6134: Arcachon, Warney
- HT6135: Brochette
- HT6136: Lamentin, Mariani, Merger

== Demographics ==
The commune of Carrefour is one of the largest municipalities in the Republic of Haiti by area and population, comprising 13 communal sections. The urban center is subdivided into zones or districts: part of Fontamara, Bizoton, Diquini, Thor, Mahotière, Côte-Plage, Waney, Arcachon, Monrepos, Brochette, Lamentin, Rivière Froide, and part of Mariani. Some of these neighborhoods have more than 10,000 residents.

A majority of the municipality of Carrefour is concentrated in its mountainous municipal sections. The lack of paved and maintained roads makes access by car or truck difficult.

== Economy ==
Unlike the majority of municipalities in the Republic of Haiti, agriculture occupies a tiny place in Carrefour's economy. The commune of Carrefour occupies remains an appendix of Port-au-Prince. The secondary and tertiary sectors primarily supply its economic circuit. Nevertheless, agricultural activities are undertaken in the communal sections of Morne Chandelle, Plateau Dufresney, Taillefer, Procy, Coupeau, Laval, Bouvier and Malanga.

The inhabitants of all the communal sections of Carrefour depend mainly on agriculture; Coffee, vegetables, cereals, food and cane sugar are grown there. There are also cattle (oxen, cabris, backyard birds on a tiny scale), except coffee, an imported commodity grown on the hills of Rivière Froide, Dufresney and Corail Thor. The farmers of the communal sections of Carrefour only practice subsistence farming, in other words, their agricultural production does not have a significant impact on the economy of the commune. In the urban area where the majority of the population lives, the economy works like the big Haitian cities.

Public services are concentrated in the urban center of Carrefour: the tribunal of peace, the Taxation Department, the police station, the registry office, the Coast Guard, and the largest sports complex in the country. In addition, commercial activities: banks, supermarkets, bazaars, bakeries, public markets, shops, pharmacies, etc. Industrial establishments include paint factories, Haiti Metal, Mariani Tannery, Cuir SA, Adventist Packaging, SAFICO, ALTA and TOLI, STEP-OVER and oil companies (the National, Shell, Texaco, ESSO).

Two hospitals and numerous private clinics provide health care at the level of the commune of Carrefour: Diquini Adventist Hospital and Carrefour Hopital Maternité. Despite the presence of these hospitals, many Carrefourrois continue to visit the hospitals and clinics located in the city of Port-au-Prince.

== Education ==
A large number of public and private schools provide education at primary, secondary, vocational and university levels. In the last twenty years, due to the rural exodus to the center and the growing demand for education, primary and secondary schools have multiplied in Carrefour. Despite the presence of very good institutions in Carrefour, thousands of adolescents residing in the commune still continue to attend the schools located in Port-au-Prince.

List of Schools in Carrefour

- Ensemble Scolaire Père Basile Moreau (ESPBM)
- Juvénat du Sacré-Cœur
- Lycée Louis Joseph Janvier
- Collège Univers Frère Raphaël
- Collège Mixte Eddy Pascal
- Collège de Côte-Plage
- L'Ecole des Sœurs Salésiennes
- L'École Notre Dame de l'Assomption
- L'École Nationale de Thor
- Collège Catherine Flon
- Collège Alain Clerié
- Centre d'Études Secondaires
- Centre Polyvalent
- Collège Paul Etzer
- L'École République du Centre Afrique
- Le Lycée de Diquini
- Collège de Radio Lumière
- Collège Adventiste de Diquini
- L'Université Adventiste

== Tourism ==
In the 1970s and into the second half of the 1980s, Carrefour occupied a prominent position in tourism in Haiti. It was a favorite destination for Haitian and foreign tourists. However, after the collapse of the Duvalier regime and the ensuing instability, the tourist industry completely collapsed.

Hotels, restaurants, bars and nightclubs in the area included the Méridien Club, Paradis des Amis Restaurant-Hotel, Paladium Night Club, Downtown Disco Club, Mermaid Beach Hotel, Etoile de David Bar-Restaurant, Auberge du Québec, Chez Nounoune and Bamboulinos Hotel. Other establishments included the Lambi Night Club, Domaine Ideal, Tiboukan Auberge Restaurant, Three Fish and Chez Cator. Domaine Ideal catered largely to foreign visitors, while Chez Cator was known for serving pwason gwo sèl.

On the other hand, the entertainment was enriched by the various cinemas: the Coliseum, Cric Crac Cine, Crystal Cine. There was also the cockfighting, especially at the Amical Gaguere de Mariani. As for the communal sections, the gargoyles hold the top of the bill.

== Religion ==
Religious life in Carrefour is diverse with Catholics, practitioners of Vodou, Adventists, Jehovah's Witnesses and followers of other denominations. The churches of Saint Charles and Our Lady of Mount Carmel draw large numbers of worshippers from surrounding districts and from Port-au-Prince for their patronal festivals on 4 November and 16 July respectively. The chapel of Saint Anthony, located at the top of Merger, attracts pilgrims throughout the year.There are also chapels in the communal sections.

The Protestant churches are found everywhere in the commune of Carrefour. Very often, late in the night, the quarters vibrate with their prayers and their songs of adoration. This establishes a very clear contrast with the dance music of night clubs or nightclubs. On the other hand, there are also the houmforts where the followers of the voodoo pay homage to the African gods, the loas. In this religious atmosphere, certain signs will never cease to astonish an observer: "God alone inspires us and science enlightens us: Botanica Sciencia de San Juan Templa." Macoumba.

There are many social services undertaken by the different religious denominations. Of these include schools, orphanages, canteens, places of retreat, and more.

On 10 December 1905, the parish of Carrefour was erected by Mgr. Conan, two years after his elevation as Archbishop of Port-au-Prince. Carrefour was a small chapel in the parish of Sainte Anne, dedicated to Saint Charles of Borome. The first parish priest was R. P. Lebihain. Then, the Monfortains took possession of the Parish of Carrefour. A contract had been signed between the Archbishop of Port-au-Prince and the company of Mary (Monfortains) supported by Rome.

On 20 February 1910, Paul Marie Lebihain was appointed parish priest of Port-de-Paix and Vicar General of the Society of Mary, replaced by Father Brochard (1910–1947), RP Doriel (1947–1972) and Father Eustache Saint Hubert (1972–), etc.

The Monfortian monks built the presbytery, the church, a parish hall, chapels in the communal sections all by Fathers Dorel and Saint Hubert

The Parish of Carrefour has eight chapels scattered in the communal sections: Morne-a-Bateau, dedicated to Saint Antoine; Great River, Saint Paul; Morne-à-Chandelle, Saint Michel; Boucan Marie, Our Lady of the Annunciation; Bouvier, Holy Heart of Mary; Coupeau, Our Lady of Lourdes; Wiailles, Saint Francis Xavier; Côte-Plages, Our Lady of Perpetual Help.

In addition, under the administration of Father Dorélien, several religious communities settled in the Parish of Carrefour: the Brothers of the Sacred Heart, the Salesian Sisters, the Little Sisters of Saint Teresa, the Little Brothers of Saint Teresa, the Girls Of Wisdom and the Oblate Missionaries.

== Government and politics ==
=== Administration ===
Carrefour has a municipal council (conseil municipal) compound of three members elected by the inhabitants of the commune for a 4-year term. The municipal council is led by a president often called mayor.

Carrefour has a municipal assembly (assemblée municipale) who assists the council in its work. The members of the assembly are also elected for 4 years.

Municipal Councils (2016–2020)

- Jude Edouard Pierre (Mayor)
- Maxo Bourdeau
- Darlyne Joseph

Municipal Assembly (2016–2020)

== 2010 earthquake ==
On 12 January 2010, a magnitude 7.0 earthquake that hit Haiti caused heavy damage to residential buildings in Carrefour, with 40 to 50 per cent of buildings destroyed in the town's worst-affected areas. One of the damaged facilities was the city's hospital.

In the wake of the quake, the Cuban military set up a field hospital in the region. Electricity was restored to some sectors at the beginning of February.

As of 9 February 2010, the US 24th Marine Expeditionary Unit is rotating out of Haiti, having been replaced by the US 22nd Marine Expeditionary Unit, in their position on USS Bataan and Carrefour, Léogâne, Grand-Goâve and Petit-Goâve.

As of 7 March 2010, a donated Fujifilm X-ray machine has arrived at the Adventists Medical Center.

== Notable residents ==
- Tina Nadine Anilus, women's rights activist.
