= Centre Pédagogique des Frères Unis =

Coordinates: 18.56°N 72.296°W

Location
- Delmas 33

Information
- Type: Private
- Religious affiliation(s): Christian
- Opened: 1890
- Grades: 1 to 12
- Color(s): White and khaki

Centre Pédagogique des Frères Unis is a Christian school (kindergarten, primary and secondary) in Haiti. School colors are white and khaki.

== History ==
The school was founded in 1988 by Fortune Cherfrère and Eugène Marcel, in Delmas 32 Port-au-Prince, Haiti. Now it is in Delmas 33 Port-au-Prince, with another campus in Gros-Morne, Artibonite, directed by Lessage Issalien.
