= Fonds-Verrettes =

Fonds-Verrettes Fonvèrèt
- Commune
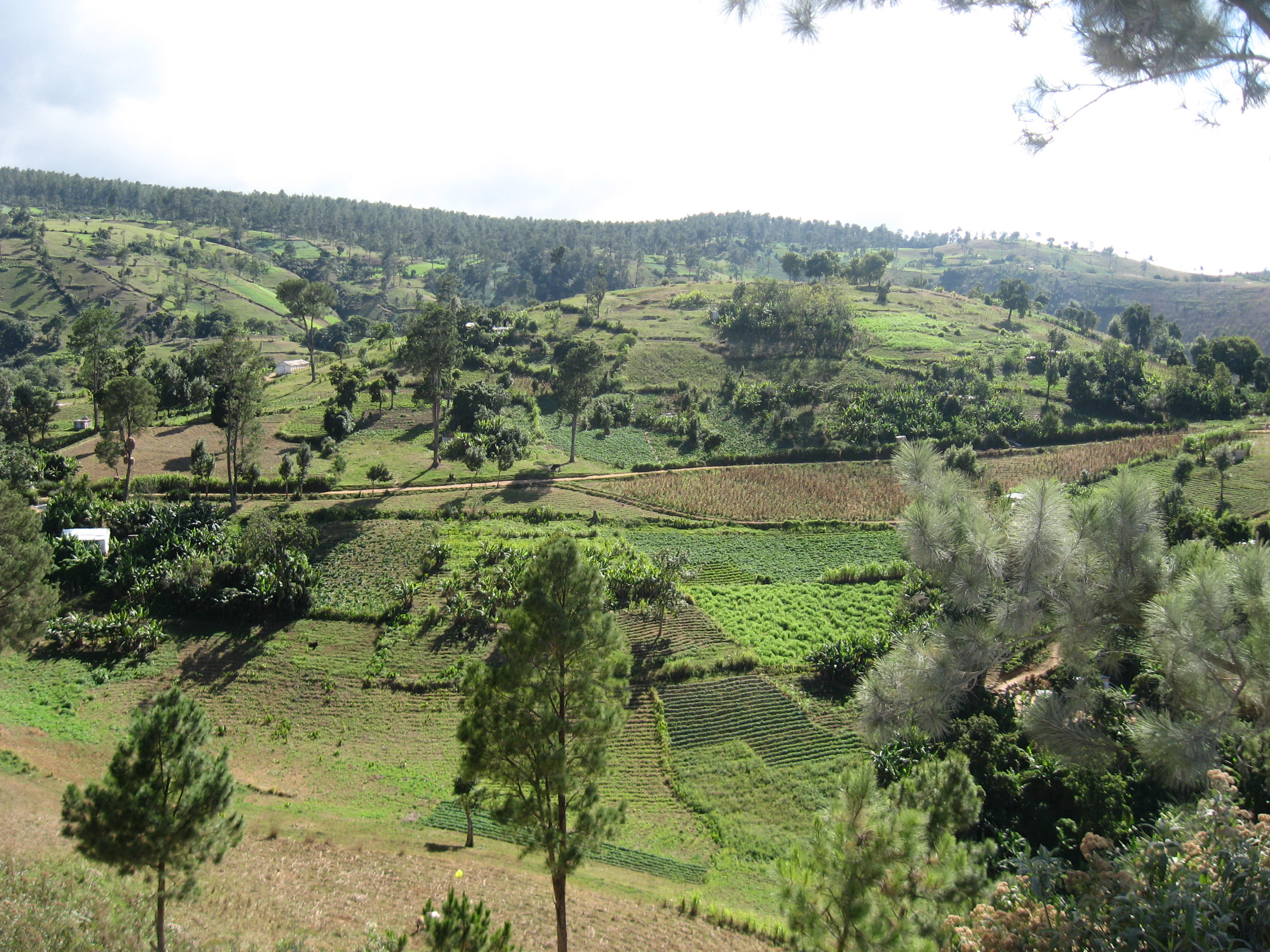
- Landscape at Fonds-Verrettes

- Location in Haiti
- Coordinates: 18°23′0″N 71°51′0″W
- Country: Haiti
- Department: Ouest
- Arrondissement: Croix-des-Bouquets

Area
  - Total: 288.2 km^{2} (111.3 sq mi)
- Elevation: 950 m (3,120 ft)

Population (7 August 2003)
  - Total: 40,224
  - Density: 139.6/km^{2} (362/sq mi)
- Time zone: UTC-05:00 (EST)
  - Summer (DST): UTC-04:00 (EDT)

Fonds-Verrettes (French pronunciation: [fɔ̃ vɛʁɛt]; Haitian Creole: Fonvèrèt) is a commune in the Croix-des-Bouquets Arrondissement, in the Ouest department of Haiti. It has 40,224 inhabitants and lies adjacent to the Dominican Republic–Haiti border.
