= Cornillon, Haiti =

Cornillon Kòniyon
- Commune
- Location in Haiti
- Coordinates: 18°40′0″N 71°57′0″W
- Country: Haiti
- Department: Ouest
- Arrondissement: Croix-des-Bouquets

Area
  - Total: 223.34 km^{2} (86.23 sq mi)

Population (2009)
  - Total: 54,254
  - Density: 242.92/km^{2} (629.16/sq mi)
- Time zone: UTC-05:00 (EST)
  - Summer (DST): UTC-04:00 (EDT)

Cornillon (French pronunciation: [kɔʁnijɔ̃]; Haitian Creole: Kòniyon) is a commune in the Croix-des-Bouquets Arrondissement, in the Ouest department of Haiti. It has 54,254 inhabitants.

== Settlements ==
- Ca Élie
- Carrefour Mambo
- Cornillon
- Gobert
- Gros Figure
- Modeste
- Nan l’Étang
- Parc Dubois
- Rato
- Savane Perrin
- Saint-Pierre

== Pictures ==
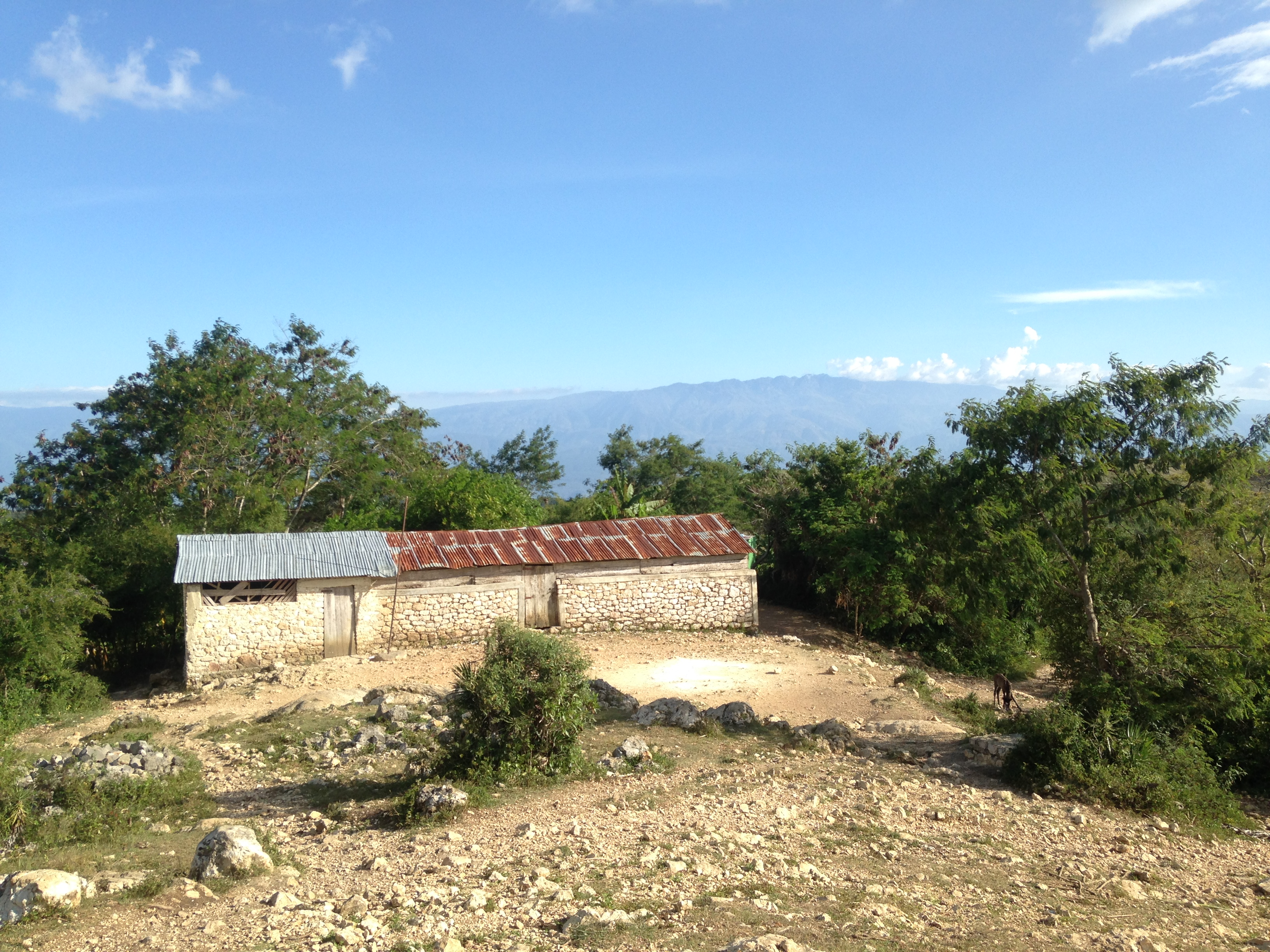
A school building in Grand-Bois, Cornillon

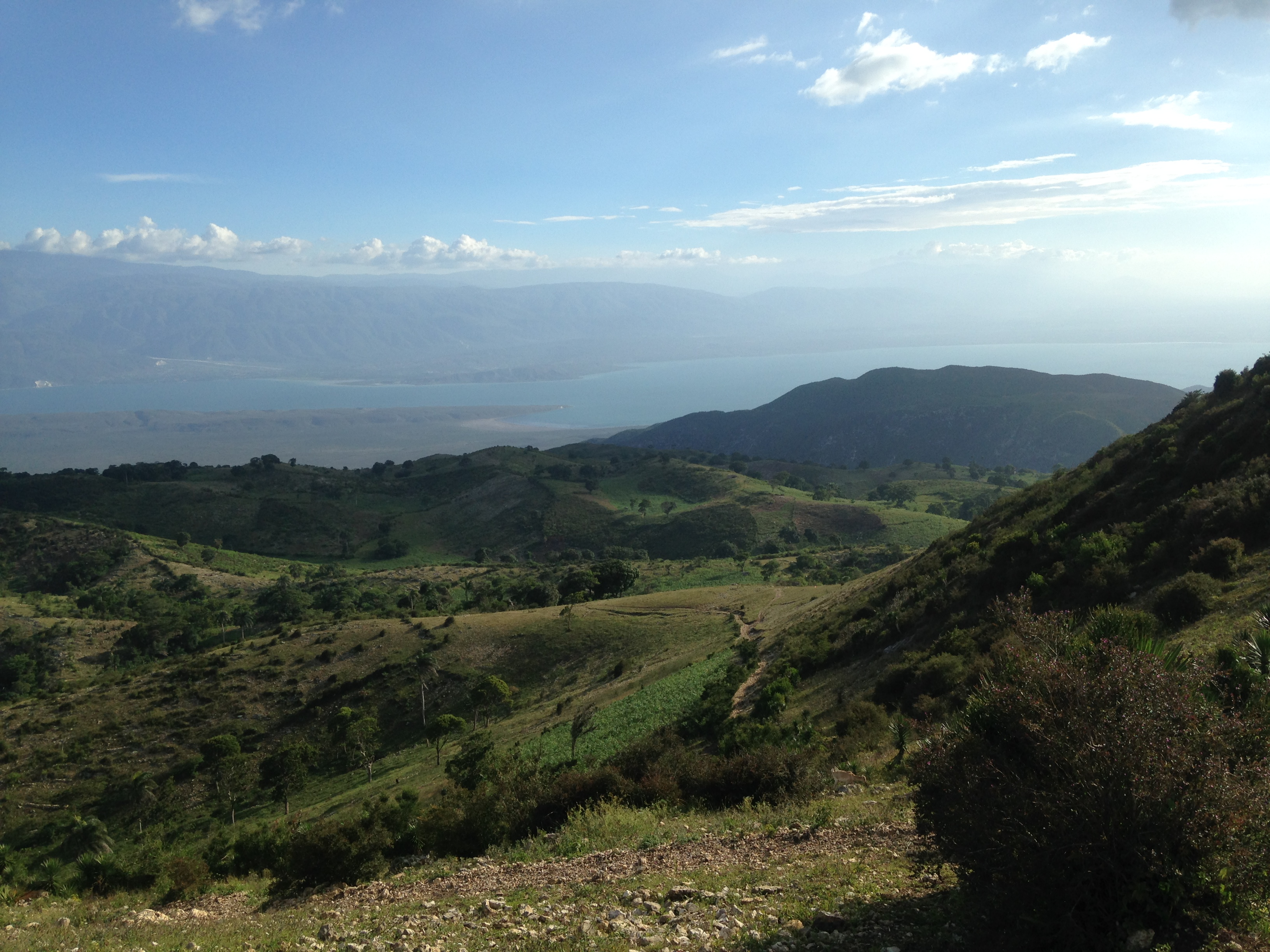
View of the Haitian-Dominican border (taken in Grand-Bois, Cornillon)
