= Thomazeau =

Thomazeau Tomazo
- Commune
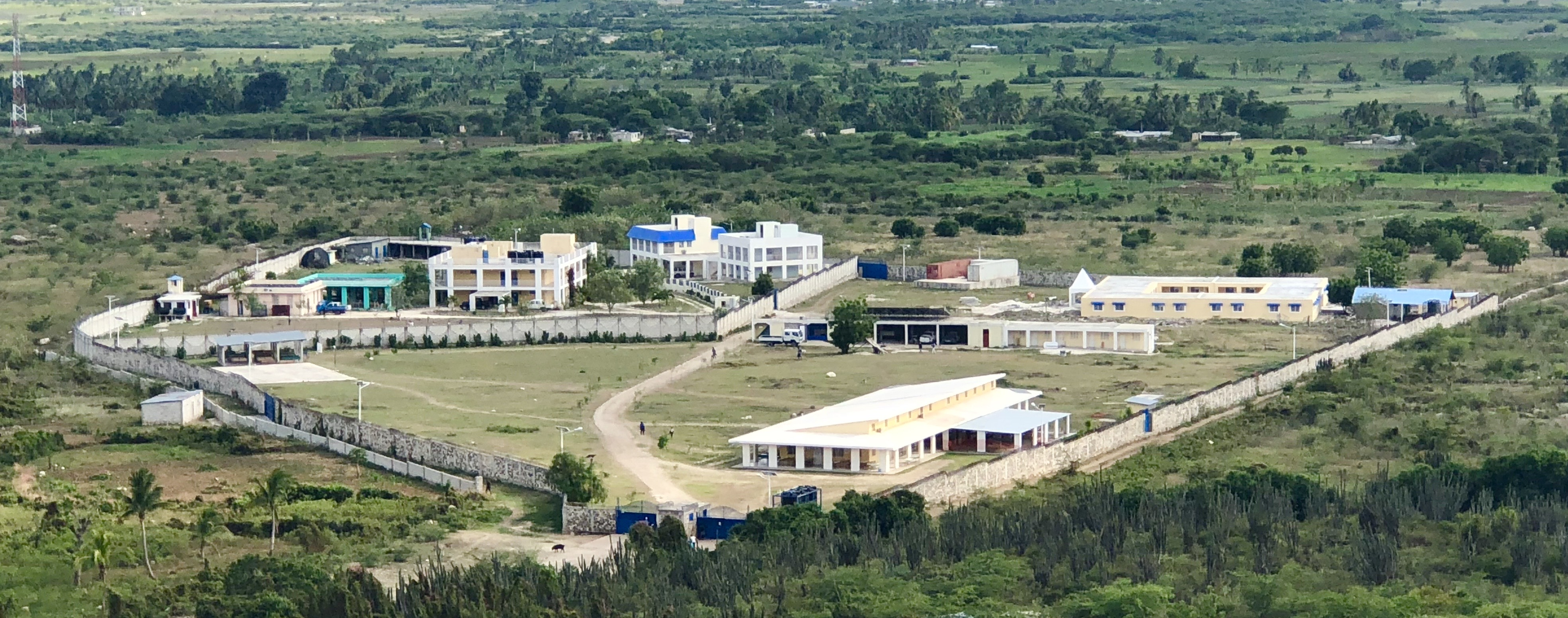

- Location in Haiti
- Coordinates: 18°39′0″N 72°6′0″W
- Country: Haiti
- Department: Ouest
- Arrondissement: Croix-des-Bouquets

Area
  - Total: 293.0 km^{2} (113.1 sq mi)
- Elevation: 29 m (95 ft)

Population (7 August 2003)
  - Total: 52,017
  - Density: 177.5/km^{2} (460/sq mi)
- Time zone: UTC-05:00 (EST)
  - Summer (DST): UTC-04:00 (EDT)

Thomazeau (French pronunciation: [tɔmazo]; Haitian Creole: Tomazo) is a commune in the Croix-des-Bouquets Arrondissement, Ouest department of Haiti. It has 52,110 inhabitants.
