= Institution Chrétienne d'Haïti =

- 1 ICDH Plaza - Ruelle Baguidy, Entre Thor 73 and Mahotière 75 Carrefour; Haiti

Information
- Enrollment: 275
- Language: French and English

Institution Chrétienne d'Haïti (ICDH) is a school in Carrefour, Haiti.

== Academics ==
The school teaches Language Arts, Musical Arts, Science and Math.

The school offers instruction in: Haitian Creole, French, English, Spanish, and Mandarin Chinese. The school operates a bilingual French and English program.

In 2011, the school had a 100% percentage of success in Haitian state examinations at all levels.

== History ==
Professor Jean Maret and Herbert Joseph started the school in 2000.

The 2010 Haiti earthquake destroyed the 5-story building. Two months after this event, classes restarted.

ICDH is supported by Focus Haitian Music Inc., an American non-profit (501 c 3) Institution Chrétienne d'Haïti which has started a Future Business Leaders of America Chapter.
