= Dessalines (disambiguation) =

Dessalines can refer to:

- Jean-Jacques Dessalines, a general and statesman of Haiti.
  - La Dessalinienne, the national anthem of Haiti named in his honor.
  - Arrondissement of Dessalines, a Haitian arrondissement in the Artibonite Department
  - Dessalines, a town in the arrondissement of the same name
- Alcide Dessalines d'Orbigny, a French naturalist.
