= Delmas, Haiti =

Delmas Dèlma (Haitian Creole)
- Commune
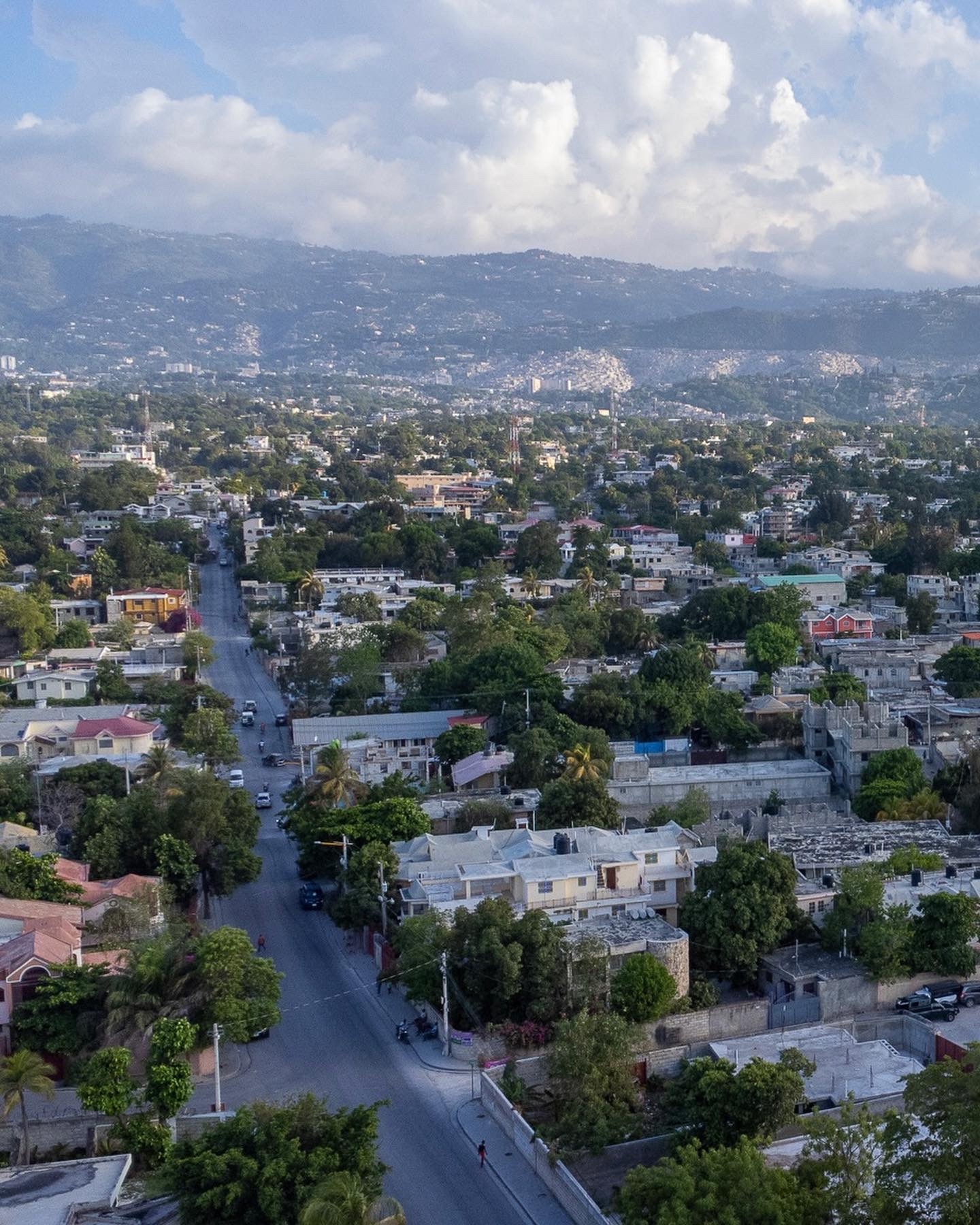

- Location in Haiti
- Coordinates: 18°32′36″N 72°18′18″W
- Country: Haiti
- Department: Ouest
- Arrondissement: Port-au-Prince

Area
  - Total: 27.74 km^{2} (10.71 sq mi)
- Elevation: 194 m (636 ft)

Population (2015)
  - Total: 395,260
  - Density: 14,249/km^{2} (36,900/sq mi)
- Time zone: UTC-05:00 (EST)
  - Summer (DST): UTC-04:00 (EDT)

Delmas (French pronunciation: [dɛlma]; Haitian Creole: Dèlma) is a commune in the Port-au-Prince Arrondissement, in the Ouest department of Haiti. Delmas itself is an urban continuation of the capital city. Delmas is also the location of much of the area's commercial and industrial enterprise.

The city is structured around the central Route de Delmas road, with neighborhoods named after the smaller roads branching off from it, going from Delmas 2 up to Delmas 99, as the road goes up the mountain to Pétion-Ville.

== History ==
Delmas was affected by the 12 January 2010 earthquake. On 1 February 2010, electricity was restored for streetlighting in Delmas.

Lower Delmas is believed to be the stronghold of Jimmy "Barbecue" Chérizier, whose G9 Family and Allies gang controls most of Lower Delmas.

== Education ==
- Centre Pédagogique des Frères Unis
