= Gressier =

Gressier Gresye
- Commune
- Location in Haiti
- Coordinates: 18°33′0″N 72°31′0″W
- Country: Haiti
- Department: Ouest
- Arrondissement: Port-au-Prince

Area
  - Total: 89.8 km^{2} (34.7 sq mi)
- Elevation: 16 m (52 ft)

Population (7 August 2003)
  - Total: 25,947
  - Density: 288.9/km^{2} (748/sq mi)
- Time zone: UTC-05:00 (EST)
  - Summer (DST): UTC-04:00 (EDT)

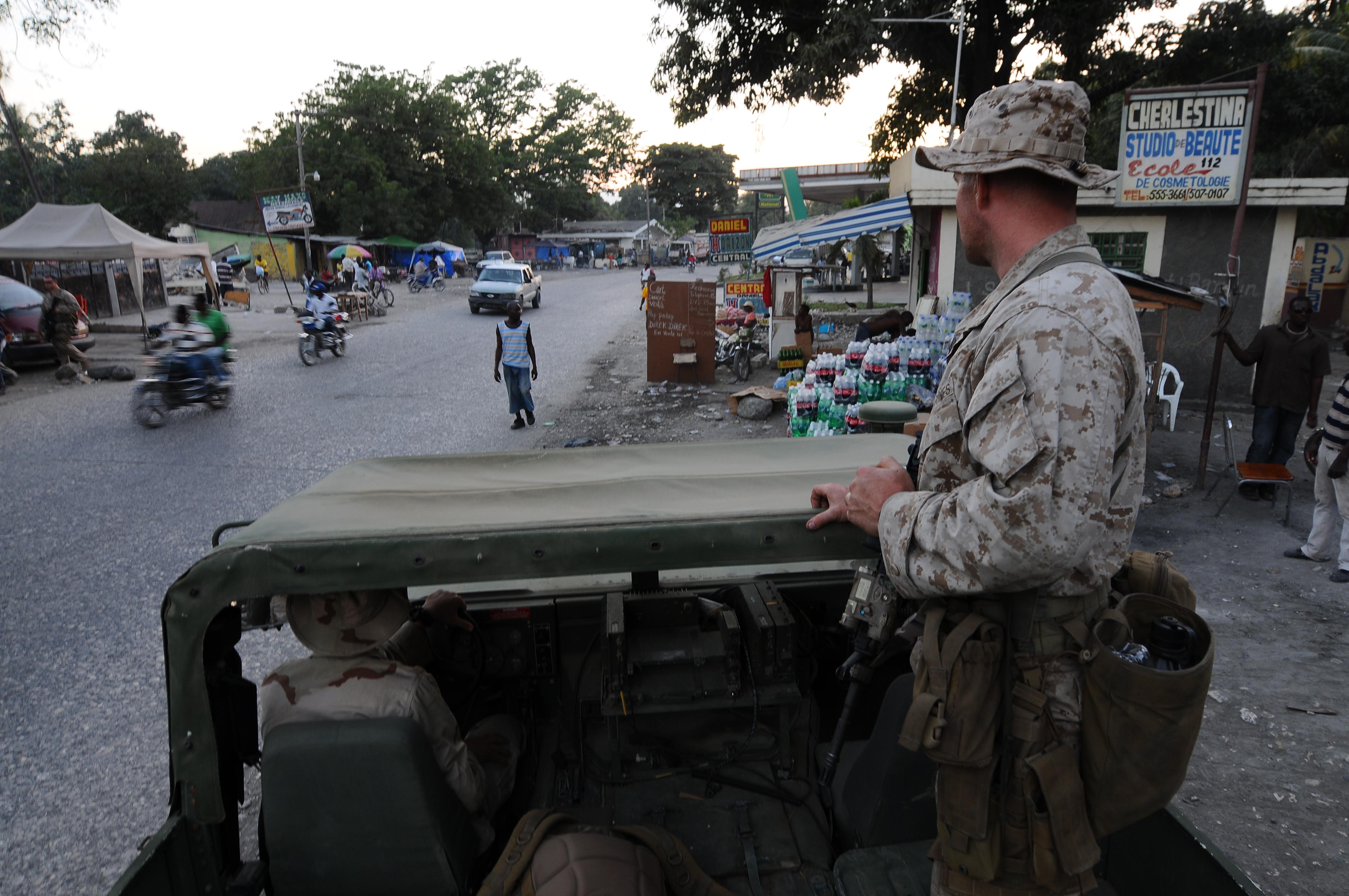
GRESSIER, Haiti (Feb. 7, 2010) Sgt. Tom Maloney from the 24th Marine Expeditionary Unit (24th MEU) looks out at a crowded street during a reconnaissance patrol. The patrol marks the locations in need of supplies, ensures supplies are utilized appropriately, and provides security for local citizens. The 24th MEU is embarked with the Nassau Amphibious Ready Group supporting Operation unified Response. (U.S. Navy photo by Mass Communication Specialist 2nd Class Coleman Thompson/Released)

Gressier (French pronunciation: [ɡʁesje]; Haitian Creole: Gresye) is a commune in the Port-au-Prince Arrondissement, in the Ouest department of Haiti. It has 25,947 inhabitants.

According to the CAGH – Committee for the Advancement of Gressier, Gressier has a population of about 75,000. It is located approximately 12.5miles west of Port-au-Prince. With a total land area of 41.11 square miles, it is bordered on the north by the Gulf of La Gonâve. On the east, Gressier is bordered by the town of Carrefour, on the south by the Momance River, and on the west by the town of Leôgane. It has three main rural sections: Morne à Bateau, Morne à Chandelle, and Petit Boucan.

== 2010 7.0 earthquake ==
A UN assessment team estimated that 40 to 50 per cent of the buildings in Gressier were destroyed in the 12 January 2010 earthquake. The "court of the peace" building was destroyed in the tremblor.

ROKENGCOY, South Korea Engineering Company, has been in Gressier since February 2010 to help with demolition and reconstruction, also with medical assistance.
