= Kenscoff =

Kenscoff Kenskòf
- Commune
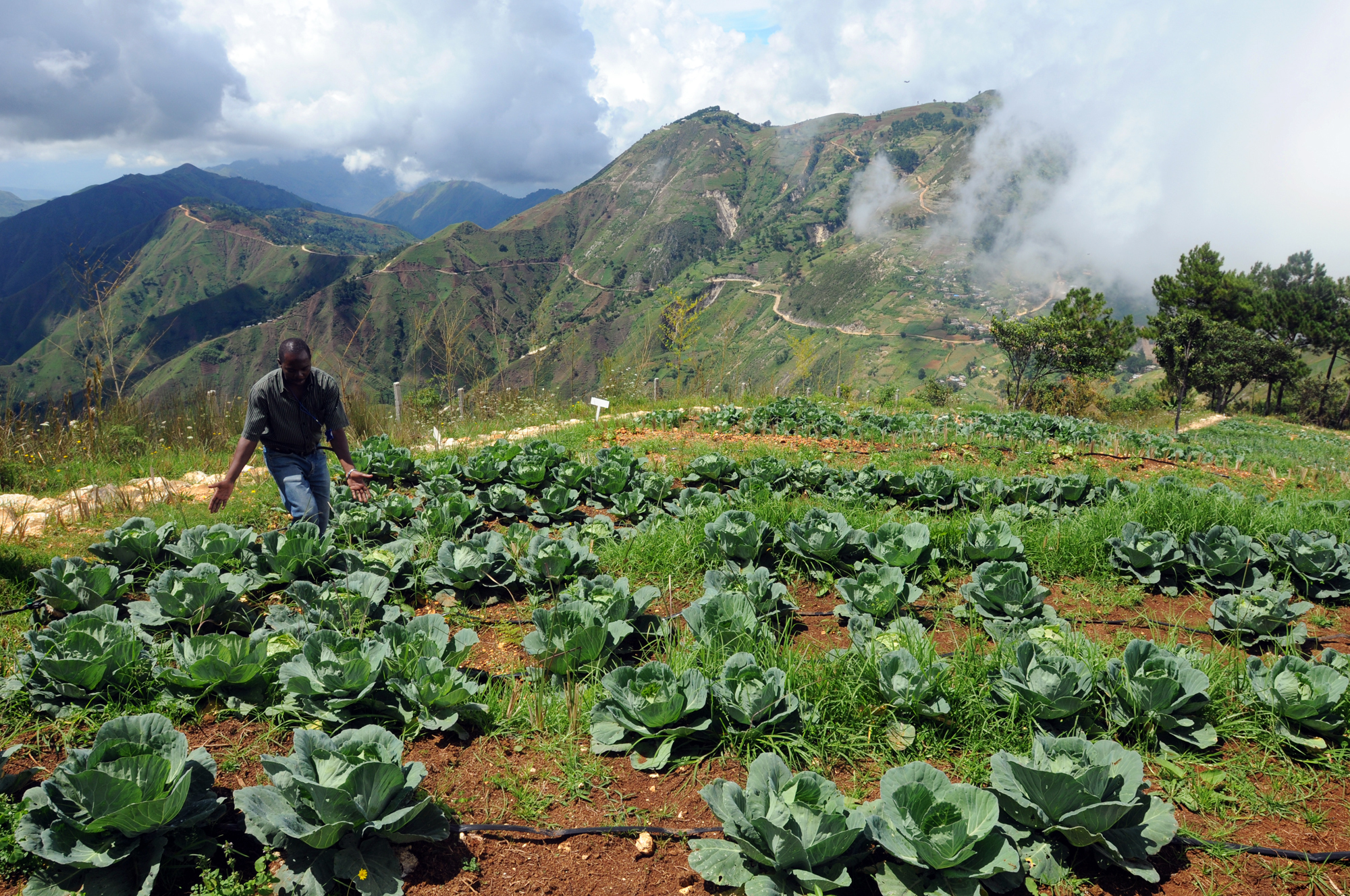
- Agriculture in Kenscoff

- Location in Haiti
- Coordinates: 18°27′2″N 72°17′13″W
- Country: Haiti
- Department: Ouest
- Arrondissement: Port-au-Prince

Area
  - Total: 202.76 km^{2} (78.29 sq mi)
- Elevation: 1,504 m (4,934 ft)

Population
  - Total: 52,232
  - Density: 258/km^{2} (670/sq mi)
- Time zone: UTC-05:00 (EST)
  - Summer (DST): UTC-04:00 (EDT)

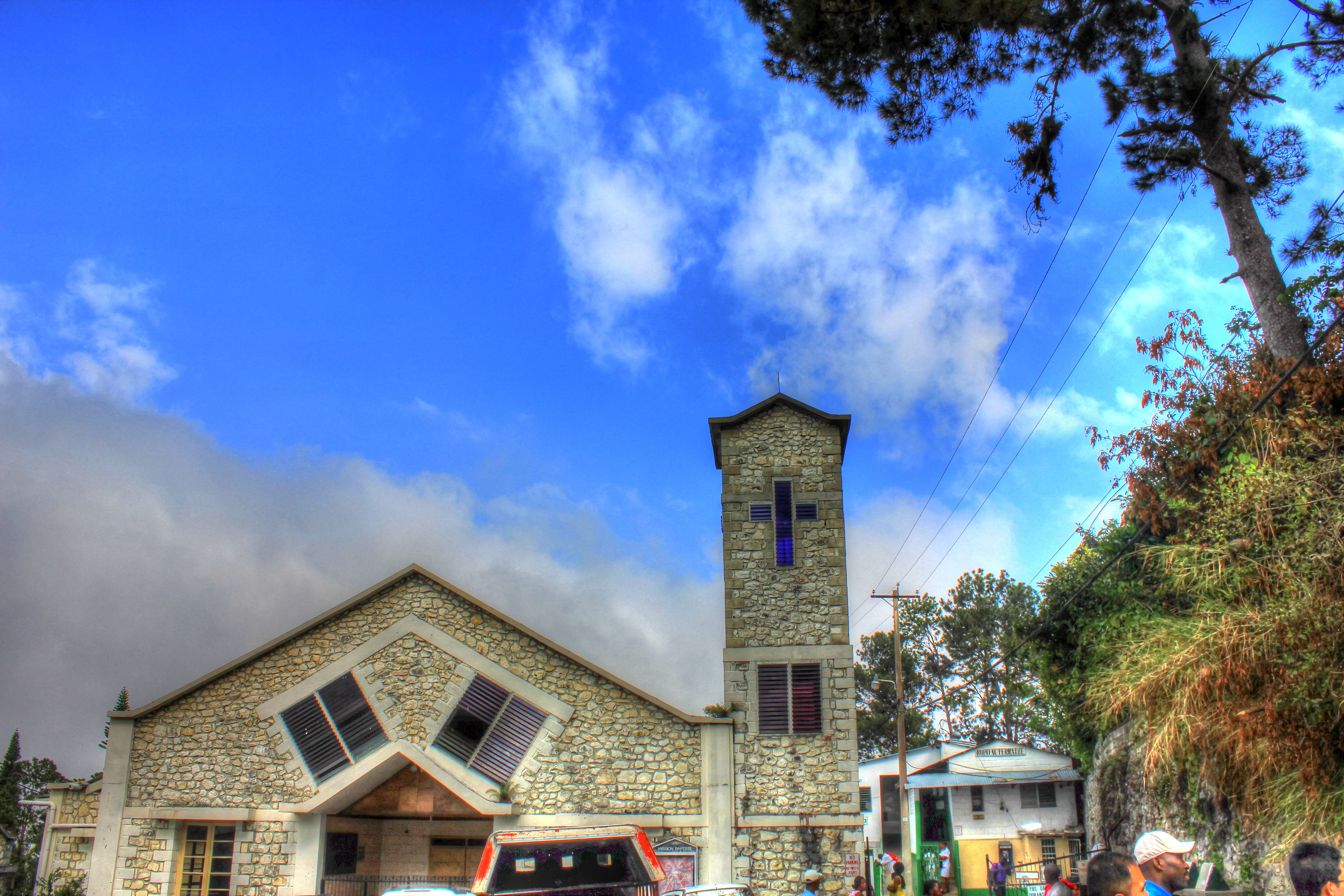
Baptist Haiti Mission church in Kenscoff

Kenscoff (French pronunciation: [kɛnskɔf]; Haitian Creole: Kenskòf) is a commune in the Port-au-Prince Arrondissement, in the Ouest department of Haiti, located in the foothills of the Chaîne de la Selle mountain range, some 10 kilometres to the southeast of the capital city of Port-au-Prince. The elevation is approximately 1500 meters, making the town the highest permanent settlement in the Caribbean. It has a population of around 52,200.

== Climate ==
Because of its elevation, the temperature is constantly cooler than the capital and, during winter months, can be very chilly relative to the rest of the country. However, it is not the coldest settlement on Hispaniola, as Constanza in the Dominican Republic is colder on average year-round, most likely due to being more inland than Kenscoff, which is only around 12 km (7.5 mi) from the coast.

Kenscoff has a subtropical highland climate (Cwb) with monthly temperature averages ranging from 17.9 °C (64.2 °F) in January to 21.4 °C (70.5 °F) in August. This climate borders on a tropical savanna climate (Aw).

== Commerce ==
The town has a weekly market where rural farmers congregate to sell their goods and produce; some farmers traveling great distances on foot to do so.

== Organizations ==
Kenscoff is the home of the Baptist Haiti Mission, Hospital De Fermathe, the Wynne Farm Ecological Reserve, and the Architectural Association Haiti Visiting School.

== Gang violence ==
In August 2026, the community was attacked by armed men, killing at least 47 people, including 5 children, and kidnapping more than 50 people. Victims were reportedly executed inside a church compound they had fled to for shelter. The mayor reported that at least 25 homes were set fire and two government employees were killed during the attack. The gang leader, who identifies himself as Izo 2 or "Didi", threatened Vladimir Paraison, director of Haiti's National Police. Attacks on Kenscoff have escalated since the first major attacked occurred in January 2025.
