= Port-au-Prince Arrondissement =

Coordinates: 18°30′39″N 72°38′02″W

Port-au-Prince Arrondissement Arrondissement de Port-au-Prince Awondisman Pòtoprens
- Arrondissement
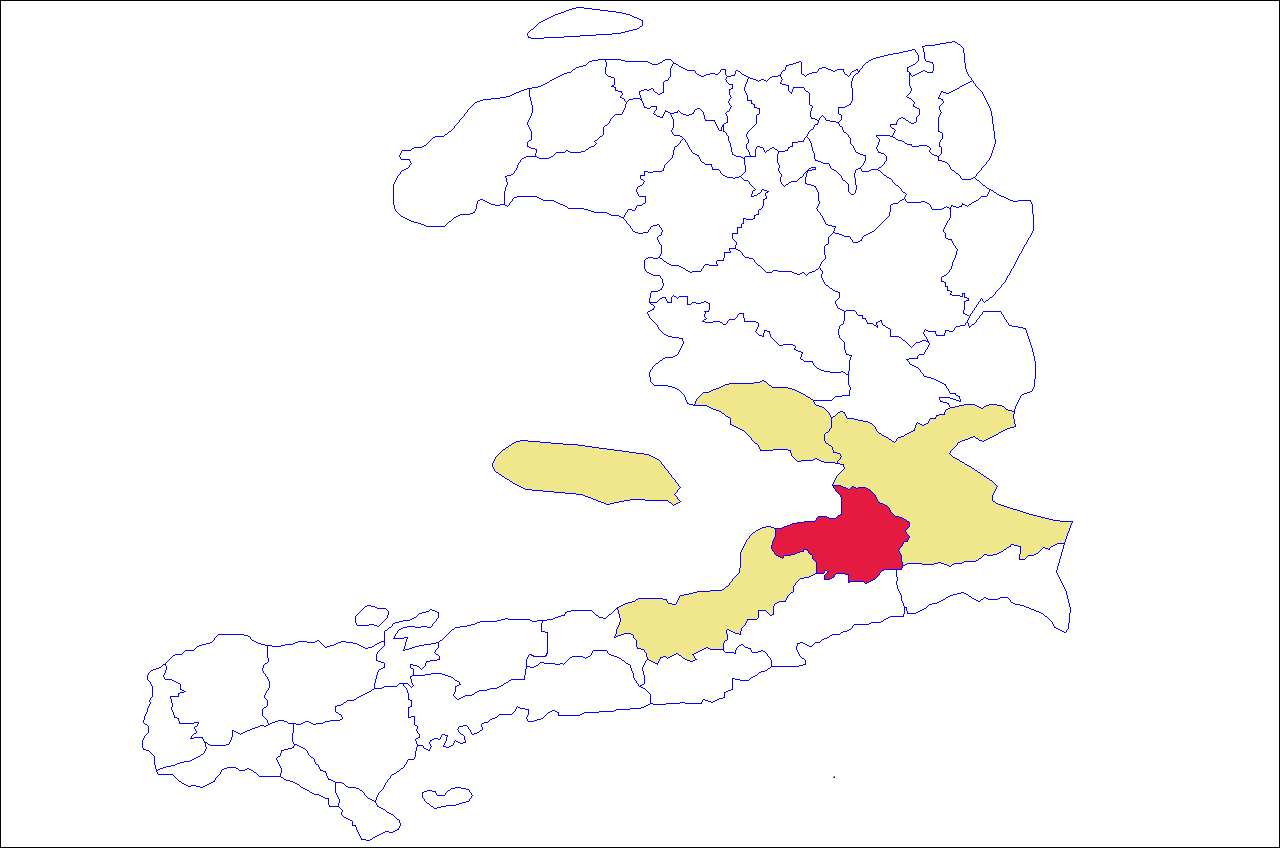
- Map of the arrondissement (red) within the Ouest department.
- Interactive map of Port-au-Prince Arrondissement
- Country: Haiti
- Department: Ouest

Area
  - Arrondissement: 735.78 km^{2} (284.09 sq mi)
  - Urban: 161.72 km^{2} (62.44 sq mi)
  - Rural: 574.06 km^{2} (221.65 sq mi)

Population (2015)
  - Arrondissement: 2,759,991
  - Density: 3,751.1/km^{2} (9,715.3/sq mi)
  - Urban: 2,663,925
  - Rural: 96,066
- Time zone: UTC-05:00 (EST)
  - Summer (DST): UTC-04:00 (EDT)
- Postal code: HT61—
- Communes: 8
- Communal Sections: 34
- IHSI Code: 011

Port-au-Prince (Haitian Creole: Pòtoprens) is an arrondissement in the Ouest department of Haiti. It had 2,109,516 inhabitants at the 2003 Census which was estimated to have risen to 2,759,991 in 2015 in an area of 735.78 sq km (284.09 sq mi). Postal codes in the Port-au-Prince Arrondissement start with the number 61.

== Communes ==
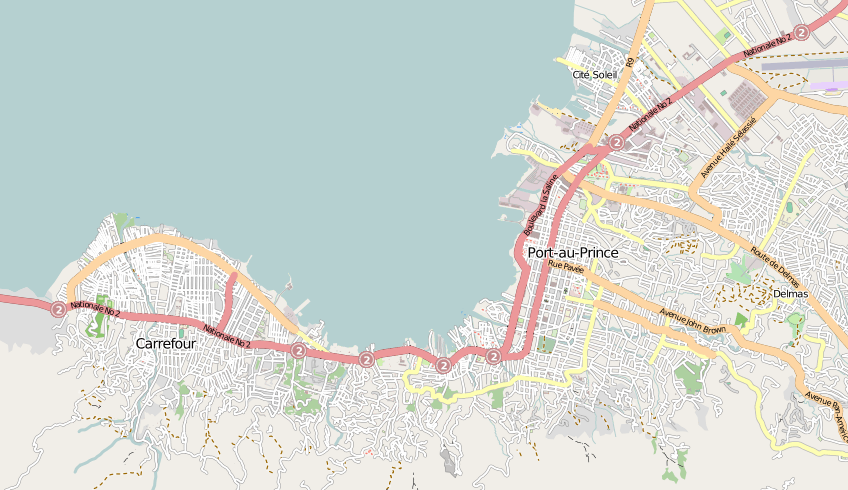
Carrefour, Cité Soleil, Delmas, Port-au-Prince, in relation to one another

The arrondissement consists of the following communes:

- Port-au-Prince
- Carrefour
- Cité Soleil
- Delmas
- Gressier
- Kenscoff
- Pétion-Ville
- Tabarre

== History ==
=== 2010 7.0 earthquake ===
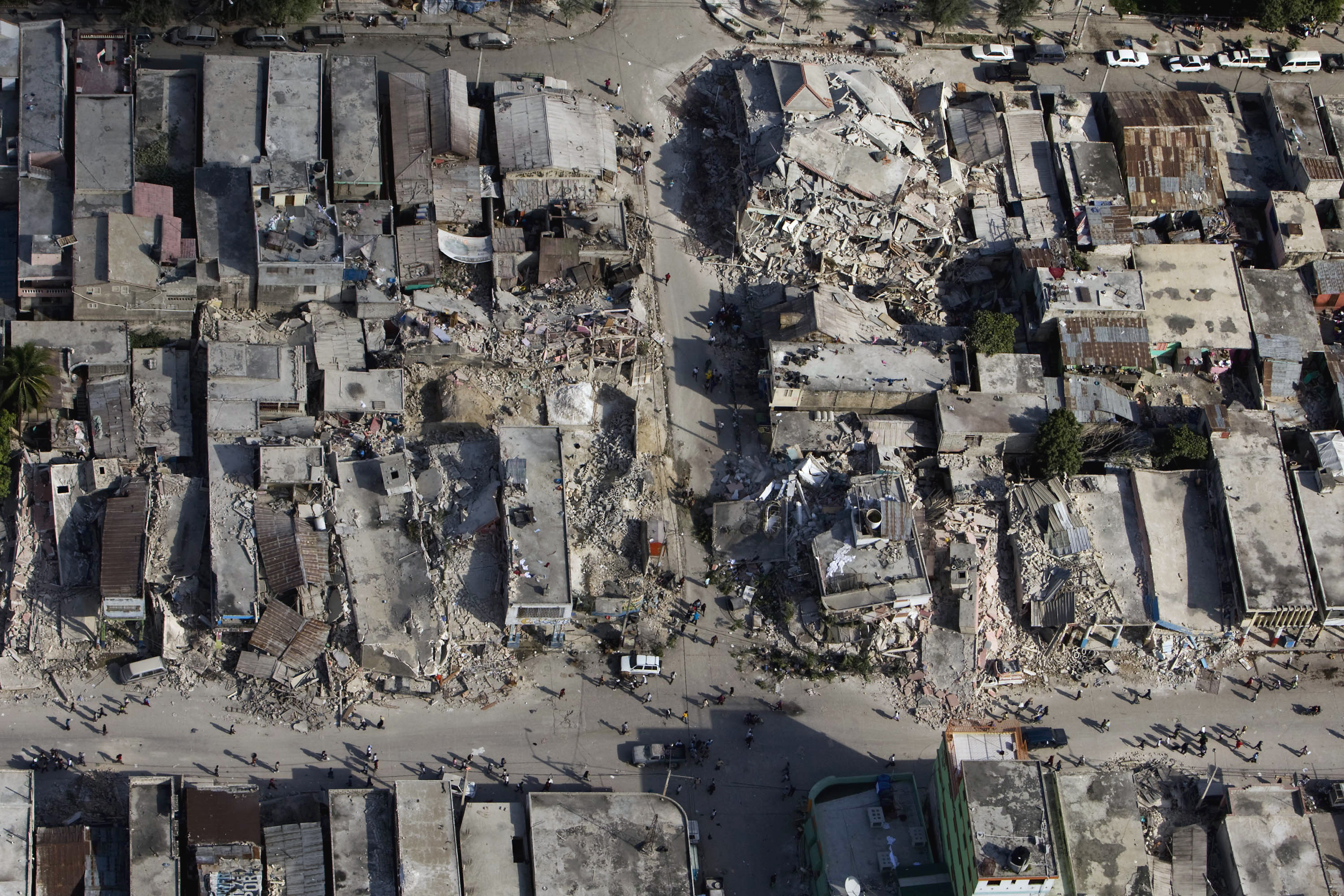
Downtown Port-au-Prince after the 12 January 2010 earthquake

On 12 January 2010, a magnitude 7.0 earthquake struck in the arrondissement, the largest in Haiti in two centuries. The city of Port-au-Prince suffered much damage, and estimates of upwards of 50,000 deaths, with many facilities destroyed. In Pétion-Ville, the earthquake collapsed a hospital in the city. In Carrefour, half of the buildings were destroyed in the worst-affected areas. Roughly half the structures were destroyed in Gressier.

== Crime ==
By 2020, the level of crime in the Arrondissement was considered so bad that a survey team from the World Bank was unable to survey the whole Arrondissement beyond the communes of Port-au-Prince, Delmas, Pétion-Ville, and Tabarre. This was due to it being considered too dangerous to survey elsewhere because of the risk of gun violence and kidnapping in the rest of the Arrondissement. By 2024, it was considered that a lot of the territory within the Port-au-Prince Arrondissement was directly under the control of the Haitian gangs. Most of Port-au-Prince was being run by Jimmy "Barbecue" Chérizier and his Revolutionary Forces of the G9 Family and Allies gang alliance.

== See also ==
- Arrondissements of Haiti
- Communes of Haiti
