= Louis-Jacques Beauvais =

Haitian general (1759–1799)

Louis-Jacques Beauvais, (1759 at the Croix-des-Bouquets Saint-Domingue – September 12, 1799 in a shipwreck), was a Haitian general of the Haitian Revolution.

== Biography ==
He was raised in France at Collège Militaire de La Flèche and spent most of his career in the colonies, and in particular in his native island.

Volunteering under the Count of Estaing during the American War, he was appointed Brigadier General on 23 July 1795 and commanded the western department of Santo Domingo in March 1796 during the revolution of his country but in 1799 did not want to take part in the civil war that took place between Toussaint Louverture and André Rigaud.

He died in the wreck of the ship which brought him back to France on 12 September 1799.

== Sources ==
- Six, Georges (1934). "Beauvais (Louis-Jacques)". Dictionnaire biographique des généraux et amiraux français de la Révolution et de l'Empire: 1792–1814 (in French). Vol. 1. Paris: Librairie Historique et Nobilaire. p. 70.
- James, C. L. R. (1989). The Black Jacobins (second revised ed.). ISBN 9780679724674.
- Kennedy, Roger G. (1989). Orders from France: The Americans and the French in a Revolutionary World, 1780-1820. New York: Alfred A. Knopf. ISBN 0-394-55592-9.
- McGlynn, Frank; Drescher, Seymour (1992). The Meaning of Freedom: Economics, Politics, and Culture after Slavery. University of Pittsburgh Press. ISBN 0-8229-5479-6.
- Parkinson, Wenda (1978). This Gilded African. London: Quartet Books. ISBN 0-7043-2187-4.
- Rogozinski, Jan (1999). A Brief History of the Caribbean (revised ed.). New York: Facts on File, Inc. ISBN 0-8160-3811-2.
