= Thomas Madiou =

Haitian historian

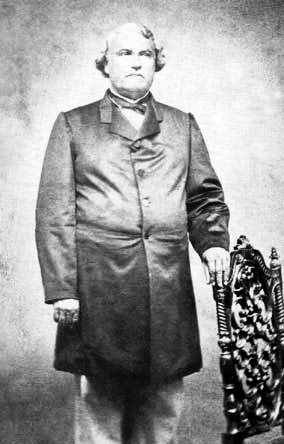
Thomas Madiou

Thomas Madiou (Port-au-Prince, April 30 1815-ibidem, May 25, 1884) was a Haitian historian. His work Histoire d'Haïti (English: History of Haiti) is the first complete history of Haiti from 1492 to 1846 (Madiou's present). It is considered one of the most valuable documents of Haitian history and literature.

Born in Port-au-Prince to "fairly affluent parents", Madiou left Haiti at the age ten to study in France at the Royal College of Angers (Collège Royal d'Angers). He later studied in Rennes, France and received a Bachelor of Arts degree in Letters there. He then attended the Law School of Paris for two years before returning to Haiti. During his time in France, Madiou met Isaac Louverture, the son of Haiti's revolutionary hero Toussaint Louverture. This encounter supposedly sparked Madiou's interest in his country's past, and he returned to Haiti with the intention to write its history. Over a decade later, Madiou published three volumes covering Haiti's history from 1492 to 1807 with the Port-au-Prince publisher J. Courtois. A fourth volume (1843–46) appeared as part of Haiti's centennial in 1904. 150 years after the text's initial printing, the Haitian publishing house, Henri Deschamps, published the complete history, eight volumes spanning 1492 to 1846.

In Histoire d'Haïti, Madiou continued the work of earlier Haitian authors to combat racialized portrayals of Haiti's past, in particular the country's founding. He saw himself filling a crucial void by writing the first complete national history by a Haitian author. The history was valuable not only for Haitians but all members of the African Diaspora. To construct, his multi-volume history, Madiou relied heavily upon French written sources; however, he also recognized the importance of oral histories as a supplement to the written archive. He interviewed aging revolutionary veterans during his travels across the country with General Joseph Balthazar Inginac, the secretary-general for Haiti's longest serving nineteenth-century president, Jean-Pierre Boyer. His history tried to repair the reputation of the black leaders of the Haitian Revolution, especially Toussaint Louverture, portraying the struggle as a justified rebellion against the terrible oppression of slavery. This placed his work in contrast to the history written by Beaubrun Ardouin, appearing a few years after Madiou's, which tried to place the Haitian Revolution in the context of the other independence struggles in Latin America and deny it a class or racial character. Ardouin was trying to make Haiti fit into the community of nations in the Americas in the 1830s while Madiou was stressing what made Haiti unique.

In addition to his writing, Madiou served in various government positions, including director of the national high school and minister plenipotentiary to Spain. He also worked as Director of Le Moniteur, the official government publication, and was a contributor to Haiti's small but vibrant press.
