= Croix-des-Bouquets (town) =

Croix-des-Bouquets Kwadèbouke
- Town
- Location in Haiti
- Coordinates: 18.59°N 72.20°W
- Country: Haiti
- Department: Ouest
- Arrondissement: Croix-des-Bouquets

Area
  - Total: 634.62 km^{2} (245.03 sq mi)

Population (2009)
  - Total: 227,012
  - Density: 357.71/km^{2} (926.47/sq mi)
- Time zone: UTC-05:00 (EST)
  - Summer (DST): UTC-04:00 (EDT)

Croix-des-Bouquets (French pronunciation: [kʁwa de bukɛ]; Creole: Kwadèbouke) is a town in the Croix-des-Bouquets commune in the Croix-des-Bouquets Arrondissement, in the Ouest department of Haiti. In 2009, the commune had 227,012 inhabitants, making it the most populous city in Ouest department outside of Port-au-Prince Arrondissement. It is the birthplace of Haitian rapper Wyclef Jean.
