= Ouest (department) =

Department of Haiti

Ouest Lwès
- Department
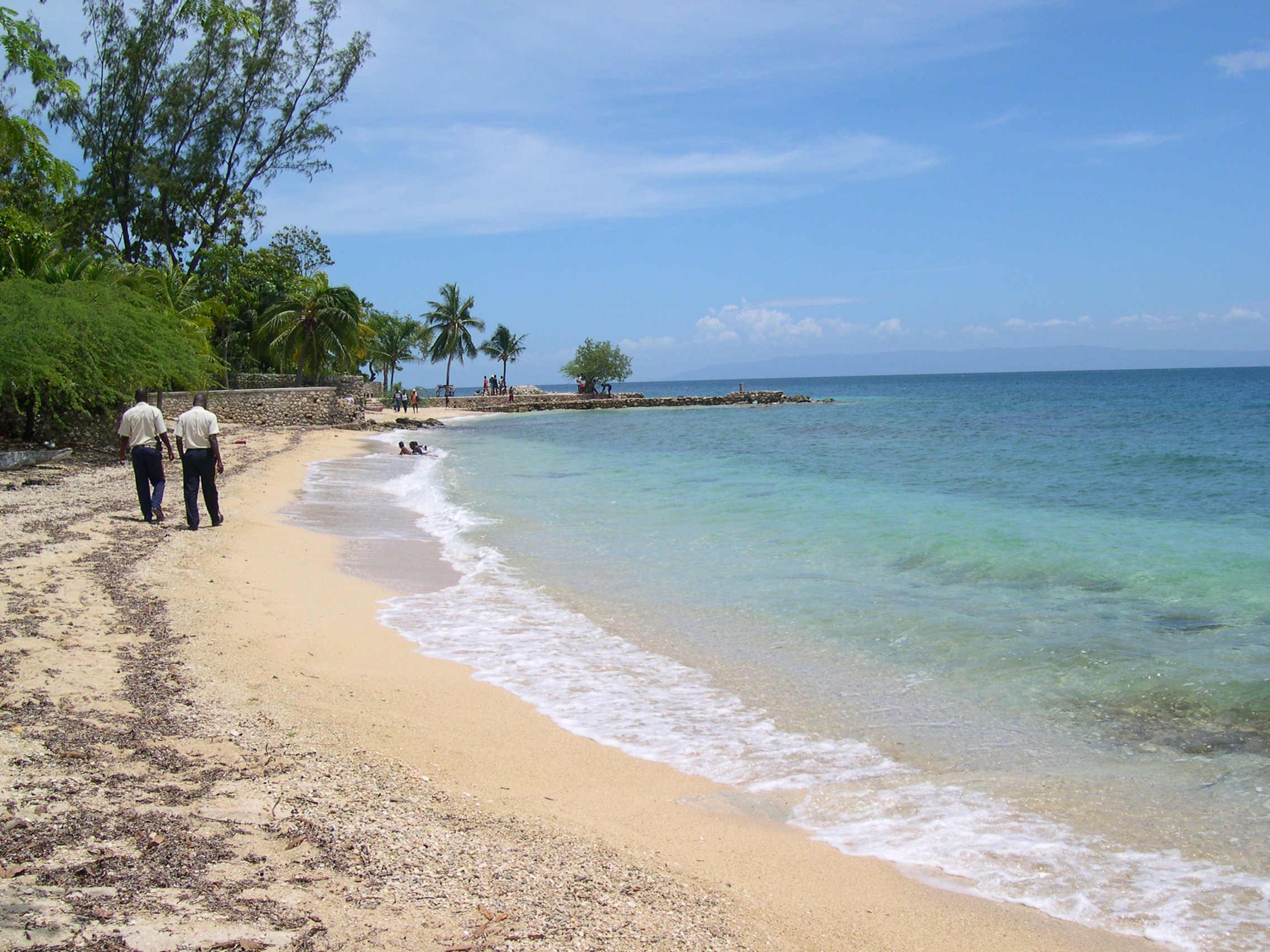
- Taïno Beach, Grand-Goâve

- Ouest in Haiti
- Country: Haiti
- Capital: Port-au-Prince
- Région: South-Central
- Symbole: Boat, tower, queen bee

Government
  - Type: Departmental Council

Area
  - Department: 4,982.56 km^{2} (1,923.78 sq mi)

Population (2015)
  - Department: 4,029,705
  - Rank: 1st
  - Density: 808.762/km^{2} (2,094.68/sq mi)
  - Urban: 3,397,404
  - Rural: 632,301
- Time zone: UTC-05:00 (EST)
  - Summer (DST): UTC-04:00 (EDT)
- ISO 3166 code: HT-OU
- HDI (2022): 0.582 medium · 1st

Ouest (French, pronounced [wɛst]) or Lwès (Haitian Creole; both meaning "West") is one of the ten departments of Haiti. It is located in south-central Haiti, linking the Great-North and the Tiburon Peninsula.

It is the jurisdictional seat of the national capital, the city of Port-au-Prince.

It has an area of 4,982.56 square kilometres (1,923.78 sq mi) and a population of 4,029,705 (2015 estimate), making it both the largest department by area and the most populated department in Haiti.

== History ==
=== Taino period ===
The department was part of the Xaragua chiefdom under the leadership of Anacaona.

There are many native settlements in the department notably around Akaya, Azuei Lake, Yaguana, the island of Guanabo and Goava. It is understood that the Azuei Plaine region was used as a hunting ground for the natives.

The island of Gonâve is the last point of refuge for the Taino natives.

=== Spanish period ===
One of the only Spanish settlements in the area was a destroyed Spanish town called Santa-Maria-de-la-Paz-Verdadera, the actual city of Tabarre.

=== French period ===
The earliest French settlement in the area was a hospital named Morne L'Hopital. In the second half of the 18th century, the French wanted to build a new colonial capital outside the troubled North. One of the suggestions was Petit-Goâve but later they chose the region of l'Hopital building which would become the City of Port-au-Prince.

=== English period ===
In 1793 the city fell to the British troops where they built the Fort-National until Toussaint gained it back for the French government.

=== Haitian period ===
==== Haitian Revolution ====
Many maroon troops controlled the mountain around Port-au-Prince mainly Romaine-la-Prophetesse and Lamour Dérance and Cangé.

Around 1772, Romaine-la-Prophétesse acquired a plantation named Trou Coffy in the department (likely in what is now Fondwa), becoming a prominent coffee grower and trader. In 1791 and 1792, during the early Haitian Revolution, Romaine led some thirteen thousand slaves and rebels in freeing slaves from and burning the provinces plantations and briefly controlling two major cities, Léogâne and Jacmel. Ogé and Chavannes organized more than 300 blacks the Suisses to rebel against their so-called master. Caradeux the rough slave master in the region orderer their execution in Omòl.In 1791, Pétion, Pinchinnat, Beauvais, and more rebelled against the French authority and reclaimed their civil rights. After the Battles of Pernier, Croix-des-Bouquets, and Mirebalais they gained a Concordat, although the slaves did not gain anything.

In Arcahaie, on May 18, 1803, the generals of the North and West and Maroons met for a Congress and chose Jean-Jacques Dessalines as commander of the Armée Indigènes and chose the Haiti Flag designed by Catherine Flon.

==== Independence ====
According to Thomas Madiou's recount of the Haitian Revolution, the fight for Port-au-Prince is one of the most important fights. After Gabart gained control of St-Marc, the entire Artibonite region was under the control of Dessalines and the Armée Indigène. In the south, only the major port town of Les Cayes was still under French control. In the north, Cap-Haitian and Mole-St-Nicolas are still under French control. Rochambeau anticipated that the next step for Dessalines would be the conquer of Port-au-Prince, so he moved the capital of the colony back to Cap-Francois which would be harder for the British Navy to put under blockade versus Port-au-Prince located in the Gulf of Gonave. Leaving Petite-Rivière-de-l'Artibonite on September 15, the general stopped in St-Marc by Gabart and was in Arcahaie by Pétion on September 17. The same night for Croix-des-Bouquets where he camped by Frère. Pétion continued to march toward P-au-P and was by habitation Drouillard the next day. The French general of Croix-des-Bouquets Lux left the arrondissement to go help the French troops in P-au-P, he passed by Damien, Sarthe and the convoy was attacked by the Indigènes. By September 23, Cangé left Léogane, marched toward Port-au-Prince, and attacked the Fort-Bizoton in Carrefour, Gabart was at the St-Joseph gate and Dessalines camped in Turgeau a neighborhood located east of the city. The city of Port-au-Prince is officially sieged by the Armée Indigénes. The very next day Pétion was located in the habitation Philippeaux and started bombarding the French troops. By October 5, an aide-de-camp of Lavalette brought a letter to Dessalines with the terms of their capitulation. Dessalines accepted with an exchange of prisoners and adjuvant-general Bonnet came back to the Haitians and gave the French 4 days to leave the city. Thus on September 9 Port-au-Prince was freed from the French troops and Dessalines enter the city proudly with Pétion on his right and Gabart on his left.

Pétion, Germain Frère and Yayou are signatories of the Haitian Declaration of Independence. Ouest was part of the Second Military Division of the West with Pétion as commander.

Pétion build the twin forts Jacques and Alexandre on the order of Dessalines.

On October 17, 1806, coming from Dessalinesville, Emperor Jacques 1st was ambushed and assassinated plunging the country into a civil war. His body was buried in St-Anne Cemetery. On January 2, 1904, he received state funerals and later on his body was moved to the Autel de la Patrie in Champs-de-Mars along with Pétion's body.

On January 1, 1807, only three years after the Haitian Declaration of Independence, the northern troops fought the western troops in the Sibert Battle, where Pétion almost died. Cabaret was the de facto border between the two states.

Under Jean-Pierre Boyer, fearing the return of the French boat, he ordered the construction of a city in the heights like Toussaint with Ennery, Dessalines with Dessalines and Christophe with Milot and naming it after his mentor Pétionville.

Being the political center of the country, most of Haiti's political instability and economical fight happen in the Port-au-Prince area since 1749 until today.

== Geography ==
The department is bordered to the north by Artibonite and Centre and the Mattheux mountain chain, the west by the Gulf of Gonave, the south by the Sud-Est department and the La Selle Mountain Chain, and the Dominican Republic to the east through the province of Independencia.

It is the second largest department in Haiti after Artibonite. Gonâve Island is also part of the Ouest department. The department's stretch of coastline lies entirely in the Gulf of Gonâve.

A part majority of the department lies in the Plaine-de-Cul-de-Sac which continues to the Dominican Rep. as the Hayo de Enriquillo. Two other plains that lie in the region are the Plain of Arcahaie-Cabaret and the Plain of Léoganes.

=== Gulf and coast ===
The Golfe is more than 500 km in length from Mole-Saint-Nicolas to Abricots and it consists of more than a dozen bays and harbors. The Bay of Port-au-Prince is the largest in the country and one of the biggest in the Caribbean harboring many islands, cays, and reefs. The island of Gonave is the largest satellite island on Hispaniola being the size of Singapore.

=== Environment ===
The largest lake in the country is a salty lake in a depression in the plain of the same name, Azuei Lake. A smaller lake lies next to it Caiman Lake. Both lakes form a national park harboring flamingos and caimans.

The hills of Port-au-Prince consist of a mountain from the Massif de la Selle-Cordillera Meridional, where one can find multiple forests such as Foret-des-Pins and Parc-la-Visite.

The most important rivers in the department are Blanche River, Froide River, Monance River, and Bois-de-Chène Ravine.

=== Geology ===
The earthquake activities in the area are a result of the Enriquillo-Plantain-Garden fault going from Jamaica to the Dominican Rep passing through the Xaragua Peninsula and the Gonave Microplate. Two well-documented earthquakes happen in the area.

- 1751 earthquake
- 2010 earthquake or Goudougoudou. The epicenter was in Léoganes affecting Jacmel, Léoganes, and Port-au-Prince and causing millions in damages and counting hundreds-thousand of casualties.

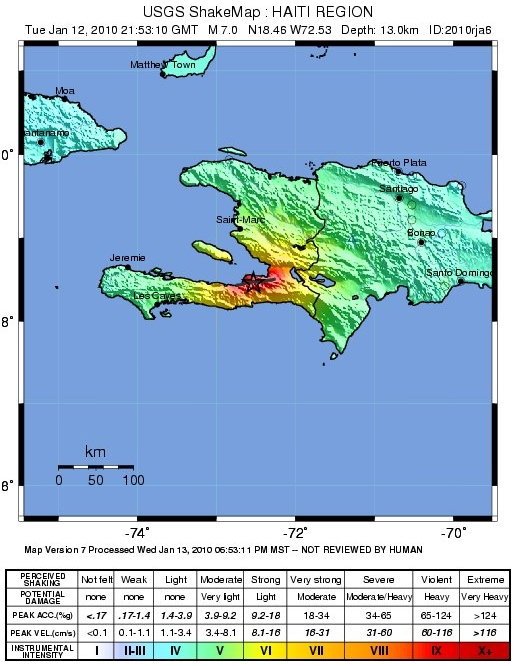
Shake map of 2010 Haiti earthquake

On 12 January 2010, a magnitude 7.0 earthquake struck in the department, the largest in Haiti in two centuries. In the Port-au-Prince Arrondissement, many areas suffered damage. In the Léogâne Arrondissement, the city of Léogâne suffered 80-90% destruction. Other places in Léogâne were also affected.

== Economy ==
Ouest is the wealthiest department in Haiti, with economic poles in different sectors.

=== Tourism ===
Ouest's tourism sector touches on different branches such as leisure tourism in the Cotes-des-Arcadins, eco-tourism with Park Azuei-Caiman and Park La Selle, historical tourism with the countless historical monuments especially the National Museum, and cultural tourism.

=== Agriculture ===
For many years, agriculture was a part of the economy of the department, with the Arcahaie plain being a center for plantain, the Cul-de-Sac and Léogane being known for large sugar-cane plantations mostly for the production of rum, and the hills of Kenscoff cultivating different vegetables. Unfortunately, over-construction and the ever-expansion of the city, those areas see their fertile land now covered with asphalt and concrete.

=== Transport ===
Much of Haiti's road network extends out of Ouest.

- The RN1 connects the West to the North by the coast
- The RN2 connects the West to the South
- The RN3 connects the West to the North through the mountains
- The RN4 connects the West to the South-East
- The RN8 connects the West to the Jimani, in the Dominican Rep.

The bay harbors many ports of sizable capacity owned or operated by the state or private parties.

Haiti's largest airport, the Toussaint Louverture Airport, is located in Delmas.

== Administrative divisions ==
The Department of Ouest is subdivided into five arrondissements, which are further subdivided into twenty communes.

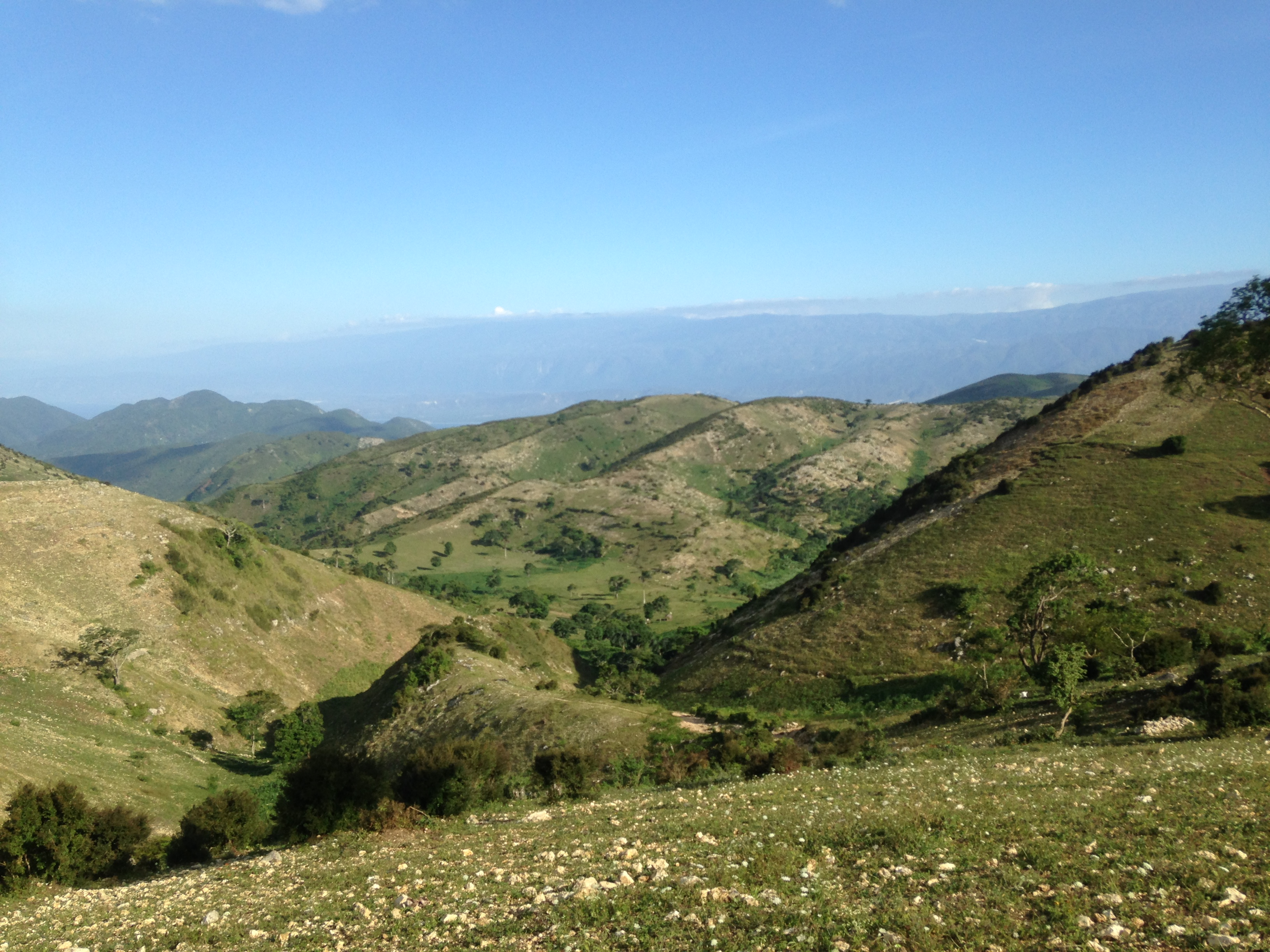
Haitian-Dominican border in Grand-Bois, Cornillon, Haiti, June 2017

(with 2009 Population Estimates in parentheses)

- Arcahaie Arrondissement (180,564)
  - Arcahaie (118,501)
  - Cabaret (62,063)
- Croix-des-Bouquets Arrondissement (431,789)
  - Cornillon (54,254)
  - Croix-des-Bouquets (227,012)
  - Fonds-Verettes (45,491)
  - Ganthier (56,869)
  - Thomazeau (48,163)
- La Gonâve Arrondissement (79,188)
  - Anse-à-Galets (56,890)
  - Pointe-à-Raquette (22,298)
- Léogâne Arrondissement (463,140)
  - Grand-Goâve (124,135)
  - Léogâne (181,709)
  - Petit-Goâve (157,296)
- Port-au-Prince Arrondissement (2,509,939)
  - Carrefour (465,019)
  - Cité Soleil (241,055)
  - Delmas (359,451)
  - Gressier (33,152)
  - Kenscoff (52,232)
  - Pétion-Ville (342,694)
  - Tabarre (118,477)
  - Port-au-Prince (897,859)
- ^{×} — The communes of Cité Soleil and Tabarre are newly constituted, and did not exist at the time of the 2003 census

== See also ==
- Haiti-Dominican Republic border
