= Croix-des-Bouquets Arrondissement =

Coordinates: 18.5761°N 72.2269°W

Croix-des-Bouquets Arrondissement Arrondissement de Croix-des-Bouquets Awondisman Kwadèboukè
- Arrondissement
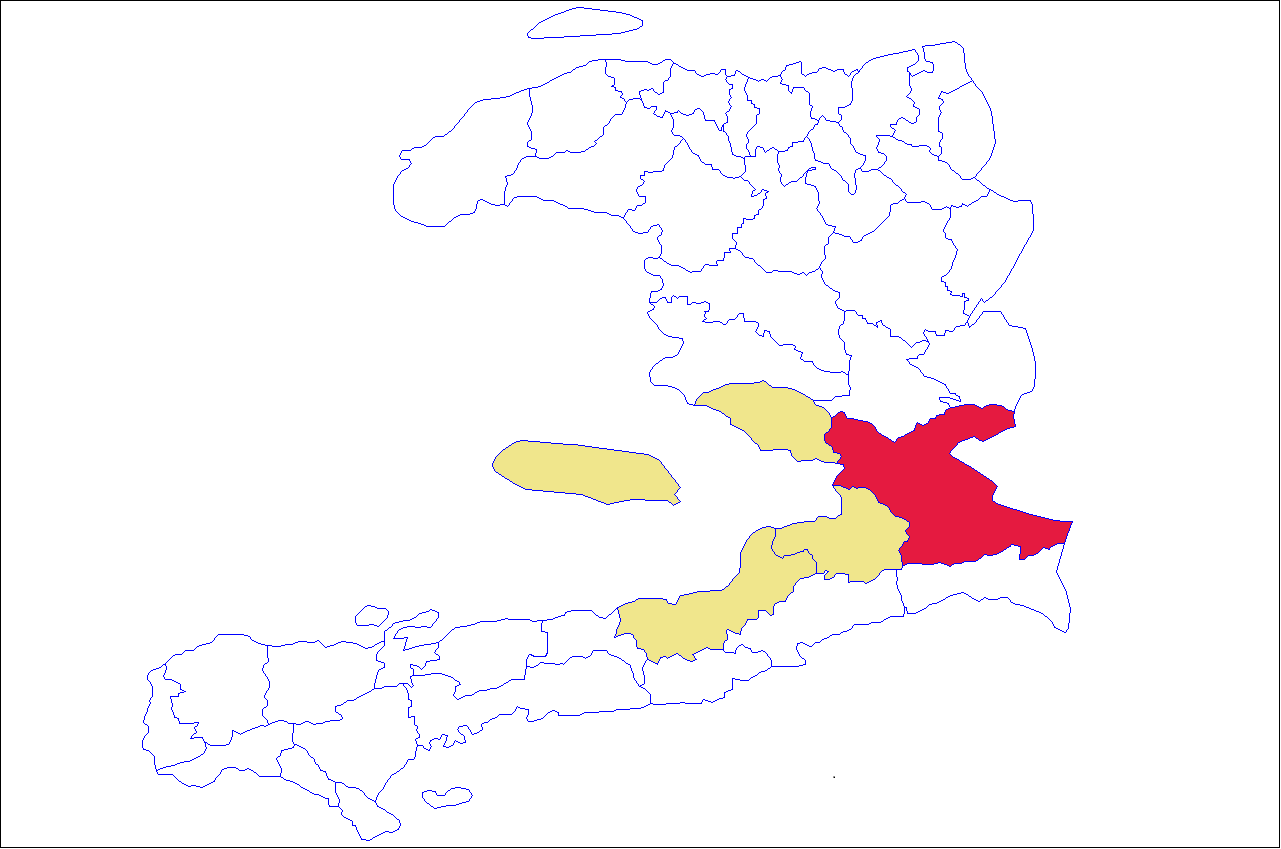
- Interactive map of Croix-des-Bouquets Arrondissement
- Country: Haiti
- Department: Ouest

Area
  - Arrondissement: 1,930.17 km^{2} (745.24 sq mi)
  - Urban: 11.24 km^{2} (4.34 sq mi)
  - Rural: 1,918.93 km^{2} (740.90 sq mi)

Population (2015)
  - Arrondissement: 474,806
  - Density: 245.992/km^{2} (637.116/sq mi)
  - Urban: 214,024
  - Rural: 260,782
- Time zone: UTC-5 (Eastern)
- Postal code: HT63—
- Communes: 6
- Communal Sections: 25
- IHSI Code: 013

Croix-des-Bouquets Arrondissement (French: Arrondissement de Croix-des-Bouquets, Haitian Creole: Awondisman Kwadèboukè) is an arrondissement in the Ouest Department of Haiti. As of 2015, the population was 474,806 inhabitants. Postal codes in the Croix-des-Bouquets Arrondissement start with the number 63.

The arrondissement consists of the following communes:

- Croix-des-Bouquets
- Thomazeau
- Ganthier
- Fonds-Verrettes
- Cornillon
- Canaan
