= Azul River =

Azul River may refer to:

- Azul River (Argentina)
- Blue Creek (Belize) or Azul River, in Mexico
- Río Azul District, a district of La Unión canton, Cartago province, Costa Rica

== Brazil ==
- Azul River (Acre)
- Azul River (Ivaí River tributary)
- Azul River (Mato Grosso)
- Azul River (Piquiri River tributary)
- Azul River (Rio Grande do Sul)

== See also ==
- Agua Azul river, Chiapas and Tabasco, Mexico
- Acul River, a river of Haiti
