= Hurricane Jeanne =

Category 3 Atlantic hurricane in 2004

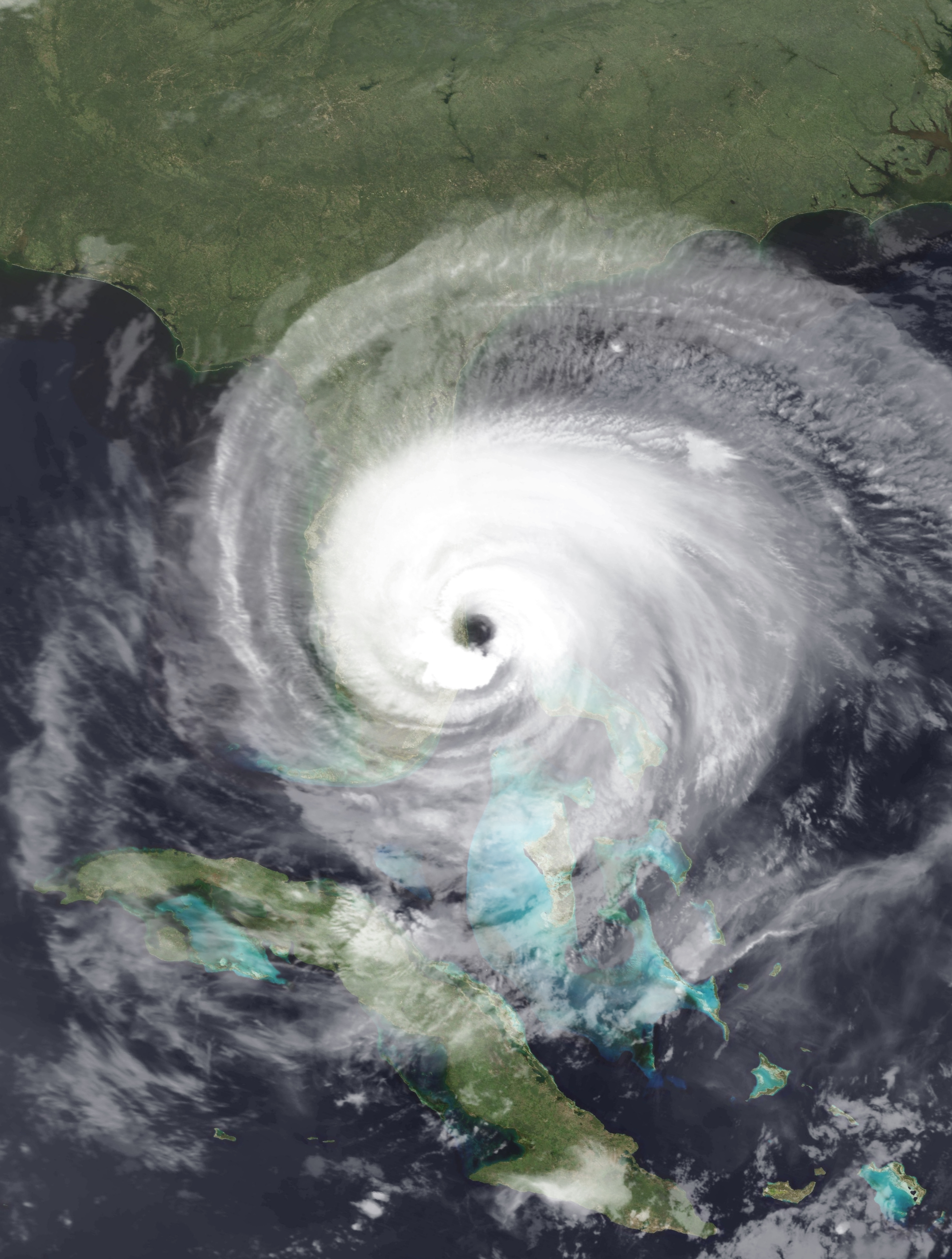
- Hurricane Jeanne making landfall in Florida at peak intensity on September 26

Meteorological history
- Formed: September 13, 2004
- Dissipated: September 29, 2004

Category 3 major hurricane
- 1-minute sustained (SSHWS/NWS)
- Highest winds: 120 mph (195 km/h)
- Lowest pressure: 950 mbar (hPa); 28.05 inHg

Overall effects
- Fatalities: 3,047 total
- Damage: $7.63 billion (2004 USD)
- Areas affected: Lesser Antilles; Puerto Rico; Hispaniola; The Bahamas; Eastern United States
- IBTrACS
- Part of the 2004 Atlantic hurricane season

Hurricane Jeanne was one of the deadliest Atlantic hurricanes on record, producing damaging floods in Haiti in September 2004 that killed 3,006 people. Jeanne also moved through the Bahamas as a major hurricane, (Note: A major hurricane in the Atlantic basin is a storm that ranks as Category 3 or higher on the Saffir–Simpson scale.) roughly three weeks after Hurricane Frances moved through the archipelago. The two hurricanes caused more than US$550 million (Note: All currency totals are in United States dollars and unadjusted for inflation, unless otherwise noted.) in damage and economic losses in the Bahamas, about 10% of the country's gross domestic product (GDP). On September 26, Jeanne made landfall in southeastern Florida with maximum sustained winds of 120 miles per hour (195 kilometres per hour). It was the last of four hurricanes to impact the state in the 2004 Atlantic hurricane season.

The tenth named storm, seventh hurricane, and fifth major hurricane of the season, Jeanne originated near the Lesser Antilles on September 13. During its formative stages, Jeanne dropped 12 inches (300 mm) of precipitation on Guadeloupe, damaging hundreds of buildings from floods. Landslides and flooding affected the Virgin Islands, and around 20 people on St. Thomas required rescue. On September 15, Jeanne struck Puerto Rico as a strong tropical storm, leading to seven deaths during storm preparations, the storm itself, or subsequent carbon monoxide poisoning. A day later, Jeanne attained hurricane status while moving ashore the Dominican Republic, where it killed 23 people and produced floods that displaced more than 37,000 people from their houses. Jeanne weakened while moving over Hispaniola, producing torrential rainfall over Haiti. In Haiti, the floods and landslides destroyed houses and crop fields across the region. Following a coup d'état in February 2004, the interim government of Haiti relied on security assistance from the United Nations Stabilisation Mission in Haiti (MINUSTAH), as well as international aid to rebuild. Violence and attacks on nongovernment organizations disrupted later aid distribution.

After emerging back into the Atlantic Ocean, Jeanne executed a large clockwise loop, during which time it strengthened into a major hurricane. While at that intensity, Jeanne struck the Bahamas on September 25, hitting the Abaco Islands and Grand Bahama Island. In the Bahamas, Jeanne damaged or destroyed around 800 homes. Across Florida, the hurricane damaged or destroyed thousands of homes, most of which were previously damaged by hurricanes Frances and Charley. The collective impacts of the three hurricanes, in addition to Hurricane Ivan that struck Alabama, led to the largest relief operations in the history of both the American Red Cross and the Federal Emergency Management Agency (FEMA). Total damage from Jeanne in the continental United States was estimated at $7.5 billion. The hurricane also killed six people in Florida, two each in North and South Carolina, and one in Virginia. Although Jeanne weakened over the southeastern United States, it produced floods and an outbreak of 42 tornadoes. Jeanne transitioned into an extratropical cyclone on September 29 when the system was near Washington, D.C. After moving offshore, the circulation dissipated when it was absorbed by a cold front. Due to its effects, the name Jeanne was retired and will never again be used for an Atlantic hurricane.

== Meteorological history ==
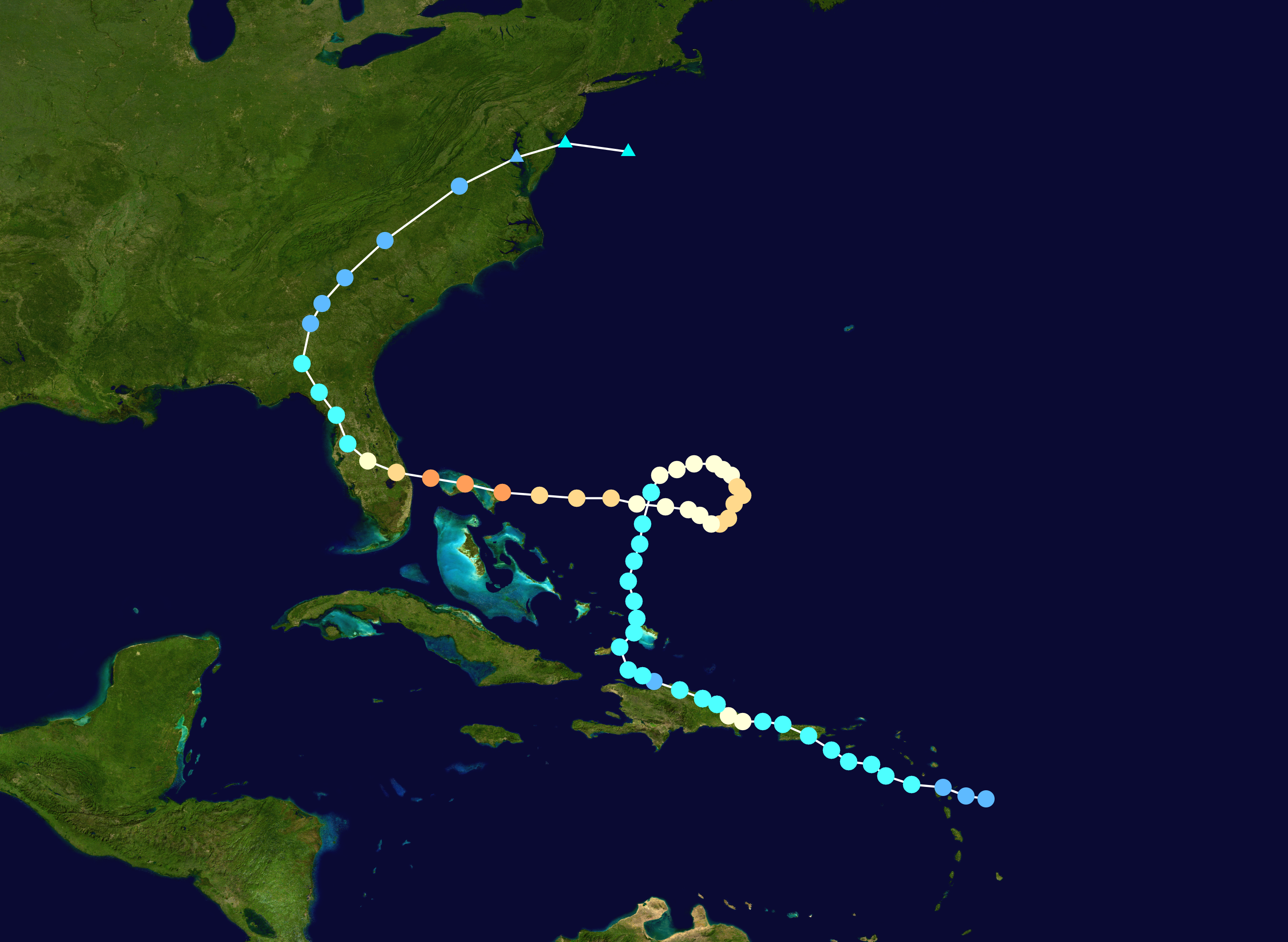
Map plotting the storm's track and intensity, according to the Saffir–Simpson scale Map key Saffir–Simpson scale Tropical depression (≤38 mph, ≤62 km/h) Tropical storm (39–73 mph, 63–118 km/h) Category 1 (74–95 mph, 119–153 km/h) Category 2 (96–110 mph, 154–177 km/h) Category 3 (111–129 mph, 178–208 km/h) Category 4 (130–156 mph, 209–251 km/h) Category 5 (≥157 mph, ≥252 km/h) Unknown Storm type Tropical cyclone Subtropical cyclone Extratropical cyclone, remnant low, tropical disturbance, or monsoon depression

A tropical wave exited the west coast of Africa on September 7, accompanied by scattered convection, or thunderstorms. It continued westward across the Atlantic Ocean, steered by a ridge to the north. Further development was hampered by wind shear produced by Hurricane Ivan in the Caribbean Sea. On September 11, convection became slightly better organized as the wave approached the Lesser Antilles, with a broad circulation. Late on September 13, the system developed into Tropical Depression Eleven about 70 miles (110 kilometres) east-southeast of Guadeloupe. At 04:00 UTC on September 14, the depression crossed the island. Later that day, it strengthened into a tropical storm and was named Jeanne by the National Hurricane Center (NHC). Fueled by the warm waters of the Caribbean, the storm developed rainbands, well-defined outflow, and a tight inner-core. Continuing to the west-northwest, Jeanne hit Puerto Rico near Guayama at 16:00 UTC on September 15 with winds of 70 mph (110 km/h). As it moved ashore, Jeanne was in the process of developing an eye. While crossing the island, Jeanne maintained its eye feature, and it intensified further over the Mona Passage. At 11:00 UTC, Jeanne attained hurricane status as it struck the eastern tip of the Dominican Republic on September 16.

Jeanne quickly weakened as it moved along the northern coast of the Dominican Republic. Late on September 17, Jeanne emerged back into the Atlantic Ocean as a tropical depression. Around that time, the NHC noted the potential that Jeanne could strike the southeastern United States within five days, but there was uncertainty related to the remnants of Hurricane Ivan and a building ridge. Jeanne's original circulation dissipated as a new vorticity developed closer to the convection. It regained tropical storm status at 00:00 UTC on September 18. The storm moved northward through the Turks and Caicos Islands and slowly reorganized. Late on September 20, Jeanne re-attained hurricane status while passing northeast of the Bahamas. Around this time, it turned to the east and began executing a clockwise loop. A large eye developed, and the hurricane crossed over its former track on September 23. By this time, cooler waters from upwelling caused Jeanne to weaken briefly, followed by re-intensification. As late as September 24, the NHC anticipated that Jeanne would turn northwestward and move ashore northeastern Florida. However, the ridge to its north caused Jeanne to continue westward. As it moved toward warmer waters, Jeanne's central convection intensified as its outflow improved. At 12:00 UTC on September 25, Jeanne attained major hurricane status, or a Category 3 on the Saffir-Simpson scale. Two hours later, it made landfall on Abaco Island in the Bahamas, before moving over Grand Bahama Island.

Late on September 25, Jeanne attained peak winds of 120 mph (195 km/h), before an eyewall replacement cycle halted further strengthening. At 04:00 UTC on September 26, Jeanne made landfall at peak intensity on the southern end of Hutchinson Island near Stuart, Florida. Its eye was 58 mi (93 km) in diameter, and the minimum barometric pressure at landfall was 950 millibars (28 inches of mercury). The hurricane moved ashore only 5 mi (8.0 km) away from where Hurricane Frances hit 21 days prior. Jeanne weakened while moving inland, quickly losing its eye. It fell to tropical storm status late on September 26 near the Tampa Bay area. After turning northward, Jeanne entered southern Georgia. It weakened into a tropical depression late on September 27. The ridge to its north moved off the coast as a weak cold front moved toward Jeanne. The interaction between nearby dry air and Jeanne's circulation produced conditions favorable for a tornado outbreak. After crossing into Virginia, Jeanne transitioned into an extratropical cyclone at 00:00 UTC on September 29 near Washington, D.C. Later that day, the remnants of Jeanne exited into the Atlantic Ocean and merged with a cold front.

== Preparations ==
=== Caribbean ===
Upon Jeanne's formation, tropical storm watches and warnings were issued for islands across the northeastern Caribbean, including Anguilla, Saba, Sint Eustatius, the Dutch portion of St. Martin, Saint Kitts and Nevis, Puerto Rico, and the Virgin Islands. The NHC issued hurricane warnings for the United States Virgin Islands (USVI) and Puerto Rico, anticipating that Jeanne would become a hurricane before crossing the latter island. In Vega Baja, Puerto Rico, an elderly man fell from a roof to his death while installing storm shutters. Across Puerto Rico, all ports were closed, and most flights were canceled. The island's power grid was turned off to prevent damage. Government offices and courts were also closed. Governor Sila María Calderón forbade the sale of alcohol during the storm. Ferry service was temporarily suspended between the mainland and both Vieques and Culebra. The local National Weather Service (NWS) office issued flood warnings for every municipality in the territory. River flood warnings were issued for the Cibuco, Guanajibo, and La Plata rivers. Ultimately, 3,629 people in flood zones were forced to evacuate. USVI Governor Charles Wesley Turnbull issued a state of emergency and ordered the territory's schools to close. Airports in the USVI closed during the storm's passage.

Officials in the Dominican Republic issued hurricane warnings between Saona Island and Puerto Plata, covering much of the country's northeast coast. Across the country, 22,740 people were evacuated, more than half of whom stayed in one of 145 official shelters. Officials in the country advised residents to stay away from the coast and waterways. There were also tropical storm warnings along the northern coast of Haiti covering as far west as Môle-Saint-Nicolas. Haiti lacked systems for early warnings, leaving residents unprepared for Jeanne's floods.

=== Bahamas ===
While Jeanne was still in the Caribbean, the Bahamas issued hurricane watches and warnings for the southeastern and central portion of the archipelago, beginning late on September 15 and cancelled four days later. On September 23, when Jeanne again threatened the country, there were additional hurricane watches and warnings for the central to northwestern Bahamas. During Jeanne's second approach to the Bahamas, officials urged residents in low-lying homes to evacuate, while also setting up shelters on Abaco, Eleuthera, and Grand Bahama islands. About 2,500 people stayed at shelters during the hurricane. The international airport on Grand Bahama temporarily closed during the storm. Because Hurricane Frances struck only about three weeks prior, many houses were still patched with plastic sheeting on their roofs, and displaced residents were still living with neighbors or relatives. Several cruise ships were diverted away from the country.

=== United States ===
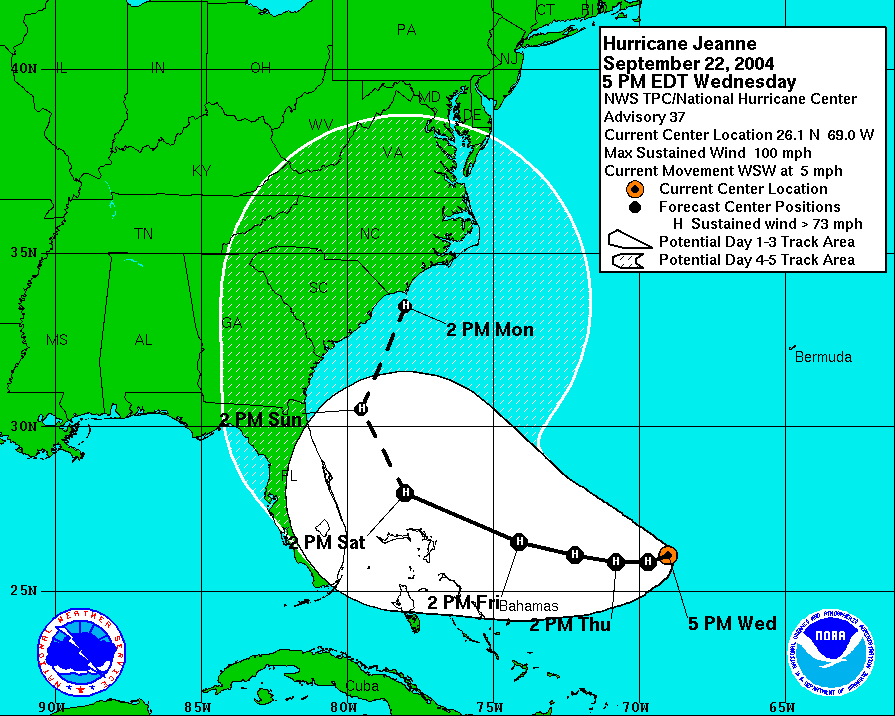
NHC forecast map on September 22, several days before landfall

On September 24, the NHC first issued hurricane warnings for the eastern Florida coast from Florida City to St. Augustine, including Lake Okeechobee. Additional hurricane warnings were later added for Florida's west coast from Englewood to the mouth of the Suwannee River on the Florida Panhandle. Tropical storm warnings were also issued as far west as Destin, for southern Florida, and as far northeast as central Georgia at the mouth of the Altamaha River. Due to Jeanne's threat, Florida governor Jeb Bush issued a state of emergency.

On September 25, officials first issued voluntary evacuations for Palm Beach, Martin, and St. Lucie counties. On the same day, the St. Lucie Nuclear Power Plant started to shut down. On September 26, officials in six east Florida counties issued evacuation orders for residents in barrier islands, low-lying areas, and mobile homes. Ultimately, about two million people were under evacuation orders across 28 counties. Roughly 61,000 people utilized one of 298 shelters. The roadways most used during the evacuation were the Florida Turnpike and Interstate 75. Airports and ports were closed throughout the state, and Amtrak service was disrupted. Preparations were complicated by the damage from Hurricane Frances three weeks earlier. At least 21 county school districts closed classes; schools in St. Lucie County had been closed since Hurricane Frances. Florida Power and Light brought more than 2,500 electric workers from around the country to help with anticipated power outages. A National Football League game between the Pittsburgh Steelers and Miami Dolphins was delayed by seven and a half hours because of the storm.

While Jeanne moved through the southeastern United States on September 27, it encountered cooler air in a region with high-level wind shear, producing conditions favorable for tornadoes. The Storm Prediction Center (SPC) issued a moderate risk of severe weather and tornadoes from Georgia to North Carolina, and later issued a tornado watch for areas around Delaware Bay through southern New Jersey. Various NWS offices issued flood watches and warnings across the southeastern United States, extending into the Mid-Atlantic and northeastward through Massachusetts. The hurricane caused school closures as far northeast as Philadelphia, and airport delays through the New York metropolitan area.

== Impact ==
Flooding at a resort in the Dominican Republic

=== Lesser Antilles ===
In its formative stages, Jeanne dropped heavy rainfall across the northeastern Caribbean, reaching 12.2 in (309 mm) at the Marie-Galante Airport in Guadeloupe. Families evacuated in Deshaies and on the island of Marie-Galante. The rainfall overflowed rivers and produced landslides along the west coast of Guadeloupe. Rainfall totals on other islands in the region included 2.7 in (69 mm) on Saint Martin, 1.4 in (35 mm) on Martinique, and 0.87 in (22 mm) on Saint Barthélemy. Wind gusts reached 42 mph (68 km/h) on Martinique and Saint Barthélemy. Rainfall on Antigua and Barbuda, reaching 2.03 in (52 mm), caused low-lying flooding. In the British Virgin Islands, the storm's rains led to landslides that covered roads. In the United States Virgin Islands, Jeanne dropped 12.67 in (322 mm) of rainfall at Charlotte Amalie, the territory's capital on St. Thomas. Around 20 people on the island required rescue from floods. On the nearby island of Saint Croix, there were unofficial reports of 94 mph (151 km/h) wind gusts, and rainfall accumulated to 8.73 in (222 mm). The storm caused landslides, flooding, and crop damage on the island. During the storm, two prisoners escaped from a St. Croix jail. On St. John, the storm downed trees and caused landslides. Damage throughout the territory totaled US$6.4 million, and about 50,000 people lost power.

=== Puerto Rico ===
Across Puerto Rico, Jeanne dropped heavy rainfall, with an islandwide peak of 19.22 in (488 mm) recorded in Aibonito, a 1 in a 100-year event. The offshore island of Vieques recorded 23.75 in (603 mm) of precipitation over three days. The rains caused severe flooding along many rivers across Puerto Rico. The highest wind gust in Puerto Rico was 72 mph (116 km/h), recorded near Cayey. Jeanne directly led to four deaths during its passage of Puerto Rico. A woman died in Yabucoa when her home collapsed. A person drowned along a stream in Moca. Two people died, and another was injured, when a tree struck a car near Yauco after the storm had passed. Two people also died of carbon monoxide poisoning from using generators. Storm damage on Puerto Rico reached $169.5 million, including $101.5 million in agriculture damage. The heaviest crop damage affected bananas, coffee, and wheat fields. About 70% of the island was still without electricity by three days after the storm, and half did not have running water; officials issued boil-water advisories as a result. The island's power grid incurred about $60 million in damage, with another $8 million in damage to water systems. Across Puerto Rico, 302 roads were closed due to landslides or fallen trees. The storm also damaged schools, homes, and businesses. On Vieques, the floods collapsed several bridges.

=== Dominican Republic ===
Striking the Dominican Republic as a hurricane, Jeanne produced strong winds and heavy rainfall, leading to 23 fatalities. A station at Cape Engaño, the easternmost point in the country, recorded 129 km/h (80 mph) winds. Rainfall reached 505.2 mm (19.89 in) at Saona Island over a three-day period, including 366 mm (14.4 in) recorded on September 16. Santo Domingo, the capital of the Dominican Republic, recorded 194.3 mm (7.65 in) over three days, and Cabrera along the northern coast reported 330.2 mm (13.00 in) over the same period. The rains led to river flooding and landslides, especially in the eastern half of the country. The Yuna River overflowed and forced more than 37,000 people to evacuate their homes. The swollen Soco River temporarily isolated about 4,000 people in Ramón Santana, and forced thousands of people to the roofs of their houses in San Pedro de Macorís. Damage totaled $270 million, which represented about 1.7% of the country's gross domestic product (GDP). Hurricane Jeanne destroyed bridges and cut off roads, while also causing outages for electricity and telephone. About 40% of El Seibo and Samaná provinces had damage to their electrical grid. Hundreds of people were left homeless. Floods knocked down trees and caused crop damage, resulting in several farms losing all their livestock. Despite the impacts, the Dominican Republic suffered less damage than neighboring Haiti, in part due to more heavily forested areas.

=== Haiti ===
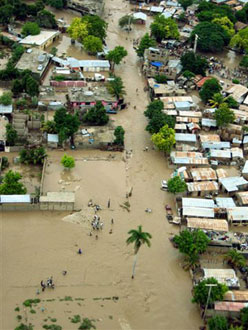
Flooding in Gonaïves, Haiti

Although Jeanne's center passed north of Haiti, its large circulation dropped heavy rainfall across the country from September 17–19. Rainfall totals reached 330 mm (13 in) over a 36-hour period. The intense rainfall produced floods and landslides across the country, leading to 3,006 fatalities. The death toll made Jeanne one of the deadliest Atlantic hurricanes on record. In the coastal city of Gonaïves, floodwaters reached 16 feet (5 metres) deep, resulting in 2,826 fatalities. There were 65 deaths in Nord-Ouest department, mostly in Port-de-Paix, and around 300,000 people in the province were left homeless. There were also 47 deaths elsewhere in Haiti. Nationwide, Jeanne damage or destroyed around 5,490 houses. Damage was heaviest in Artibonite, Centre, Nord-Ouest, and Sud departments. Due to the large number of deaths, many of the corpses were either incinerated or buried in mass graves, which provoked protests. The floods and landslides were worsened by deforestation, which left the country without natural barriers against floodwaters and mudslides. Its impacts on the population were exacerbated by the floods in May 2004, which killed thousands in the country, and by the lack of proper disaster management when Jeanne struck, owing to the country's political instability. The country was also lacking proper disaster management when Jeanne struck, ruled by an interim government following a coup d'état, with security assistance from the United Nations.

The floods from Jeanne inundated about 80% of Gonaïves, a city of around 100,000 people. Residents were forced onto their roofs or to flee to safer areas, including 600 people that stayed in the city's cathedral. About 4,000 homes in the city were destroyed, resulting in 20,000 people becoming homeless. The infrastructure of Gonaïves was largely destroyed, with no functioning water system and limited electricity after Jeanne's passage. The floods blocked roads connecting Gonaïves with both Saint-Marc and Port-de-Paix. Floodwaters also destroyed the city's two hospitals and 90% of private clinics. About 450 members of the UN Peacekeeping force were displaced when floods damaged their camp. About 30% of the city of Port-de-Paix was inundated by Les Trois Rivières, and parts of the city were covered in landslides. In Gros-Morne, 100 houses were destroyed. The floods also washed away crops and livestock across the region.

=== Bahamas ===
While moving through the Bahamas, Jeanne produced winds of major hurricane-force on Grand Bahama and Abaco islands. The hurricane further damaged homes that were previously damaged by Hurricane Frances only three weeks earlier. At Settlement Point on Grand Bahama, a Coastal-Marine Automated Network weather station recorded sustained winds of 89 mph (142 km/h). Floodwaters reached 3 ft (0.91 m) deep on Eleuthera, and 6 ft (1.8 m) deep at Marsh Harbour on Abaco. Across Grand Bahama and Abaco, Jeanne damaged power and water systems, as well as several roads. Prime Minister Perry Christie declared both island groups as disaster areas on September 27. Nationwide, about 800 homes were damaged or destroyed.

Floodwaters inundated Grand Bahama International Airport, temporarily closing it. Storm surge flooding entered several homes near the coast in the eastern portion of the island. Storm shelters in Eight Mile Rock were damaged due to the hurricane's passage. At High Rock, high waves washed out a portion of the road near the beach. In Freeport, the hurricane damaged the roof to the office of the Prime Minister. The hurricane also severely damaged the fire station as well as the local YMCA. Hundreds of homes on Abaco were damaged, including 50 that were condemned. About one-third of the homes at Sandy Point had flood damage, and several homes also experienced roofing damage. Government buildings across the Abaco Islands sustained about $30 million in damage, including damage to two high schools, a primary school, and a library. The Marsh Harbour Airport was inundated with floodwaters for three days. Businesses were closed for weeks due to the flood damage in Marsh Harbour. In the Berry Islands, Jeanne eroded a causeway while also damaging homes and schools.

=== United States ===
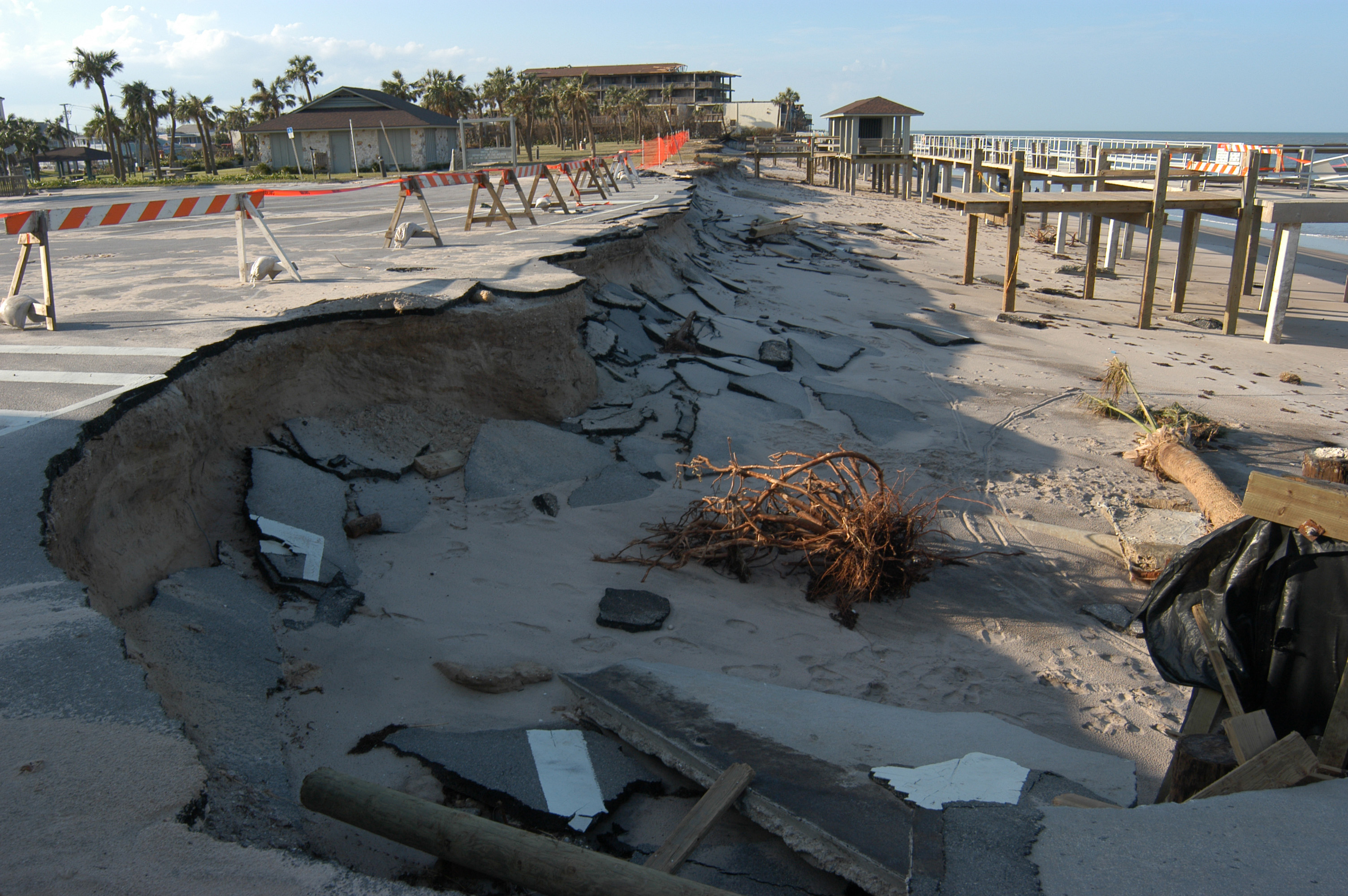
Storm surge and wave action from Hurricane Jeanne severely eroded Vero Beach

Throughout the mainland United States, Hurricane Jeanne left $7.5 billion in damage. There were also five direct deaths in the country – three in Florida, one in South Carolina, and one in Virginia.

==== Florida ====
Jeanne was the fourth storm in 2004 to produce hurricane-force winds in Florida, after hurricanes Charley, Frances, and Ivan. Jeanne produced hurricane-force winds from around Stuart to Cape Canaveral, and extended halfway across the state. The strongest recorded sustained winds in Florida was 91 mph (146 km/h) at the Melbourne NWS office. Wind gusts reached 128 mph (205 km/h) at Fort Pierce Inlet, and 122 mph (196 km/h) in Vero Beach. Farther inland, Orlando International Airport recorded gusts of 77 mph (124 km/h). Jeanne also spawned nine tornadoes in Florida, mostly in the eyewall or innermost rainbands. A tornado, rated F1 on the Fujita scale, touched down west of Vero Beach, knocking down trees near its path. Over a 20–minute period, two F1 tornadoes hit Barefoot Bay in Brevard County. The first knocked down a few trees, and the second damaged about a dozen houses. The remaining tornadoes were all rated F0; two were in Flagler County, and the other four touched down in St. Johns County.

While moving ashore, Jeanne produced a storm surge of 3.8 ft (1.2 m) in Cape Canaveral. High tides and waves eroded beaches from Jupiter Inlet to New Smyrna Beach, as well as parts of the Intracoastal Waterway, adding to the erosion caused by Hurricane Frances. From Martin to Brevard counties, the storm surge occurred around low tide, which limited damaging tidal floods. In New Smyrna Beach, the surge coincided with the high tides, resulting in significant erosion. Sand and ocean water covered parts of Florida State Road A1A, and parts of the route were washed away on Hutchinson Island. Erosion also damaged parts of the Sebastian Inlet Bridge, closing it for a week. Water levels along Lake Okeechobee reached 7 ft (2.1 m) above normal, which flooded a few marinas. Above normal tides occurred as far south as Key West, inundating portions of its airport. Cedar Key on the west coast recorded tides 4.5 ft (1.4 m) below-normal due to offshore winds. The hurricane also dropped heavy rainfall across the state, the heaviest totals being recorded along the eyewall's path. Precipitation in the state peaked at 11.97 in (304 mm), recorded in Kenansville in Osceola. In Holder in Citrus County, the Withlacoochee River swelled to a record crest of 10.86 ft (3.31 m).

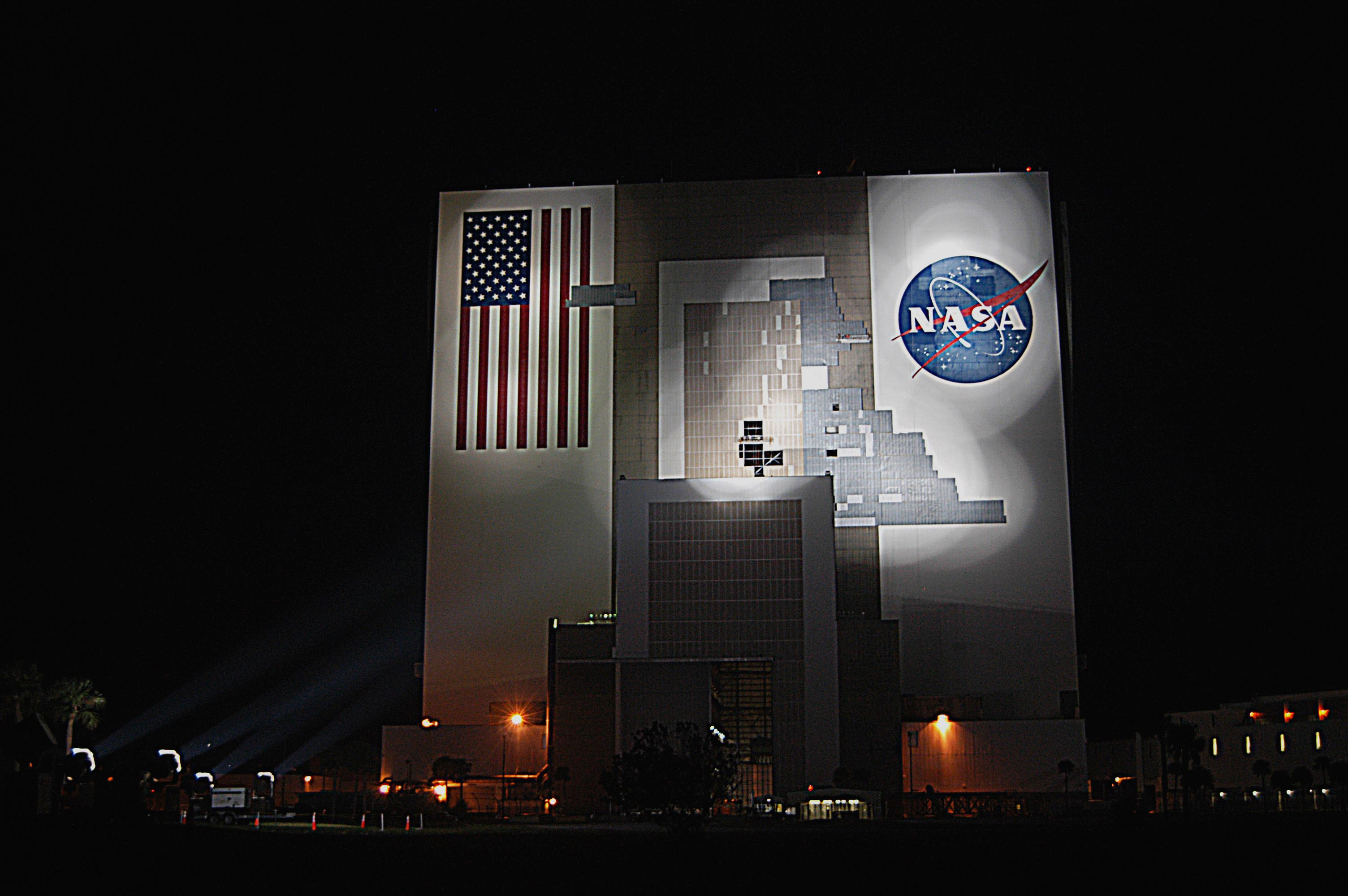
Damage to the Vehicle Assembly Building at Kennedy Space Center caused by hurricanes Frances and Jeanne

A man drowned in Palm Bay in Brevard County, driving his car into a flooded ditch. In Indian River County, an elderly woman died a few days after being injured during evacuations. In Clay County, a falling tree limb struck and killed a child. A man in St. Lucie County was electrocuted due to a downed power line. In Orange County, a man died after falling off a ladder while using a chainsaw. In Lake County, a woman died due to a fire, caused by a candle lit during a power outage. Statewide, the hurricane left around 2.5 million people without power. The hurricane added to the agricultural damage caused by previous hurricanes Charley and Frances. Jeanne destroyed the roofs of several homes that were previously damaged by Frances. In Melbourne, about 120 people had to evacuate twice when the shelters they were in lost their roofs.

In Martin County, where Jeanne moved ashore, the hurricane damaged 4,234 homes, 181 of which were destroyed, while also damaging the Martin Memorial Hospital North in Stuart. Thousands of homes in St. Lucie County were damaged or destroyed, with dozens of mobile home trailer parks heavily damaged. In Fort Pierce Inlet, Jeanne's high tides destroyed dozens of boats. More than 41,000 homes in Indian River County were damaged to some degree. County officials advised most residents to boil water due to power outages. The Vehicle Assembly Building at Kennedy Space Center sustained damage to panels. Farther north, thousands of homes were damaged in Volusia County due to the combination of high winds and floods along the St. Johns River. South of the landfall location, the rains caused generally minor flooding, with locally severe floods in Palm Beach Gardens and Jupiter, and on farms in western Palm Beach County. Farther inland, Jeanne damaged roofs and mobile homes from Okeechobee to Orange counties. In Lake County, more than 2,800 homes were damaged, 111 of which were destroyed. The storm also damaged citrus and other crops across the area. About 2,000 houses sustained severe damage in Highlands County, including 140 that were destroyed. In Lakeland in Polk County, a retention pond overflowed and caused parts of a strip mall to collapse. Floods closed streets in St. Cloud in Osceola County, including parts of U.S. Route 192. Most rivers across northern Florida reached flood stage, which closed portions of Interstate 10. In Live Oak, several roads were washed out. Parts of Punta Gorda were flooded by Jeanne's storm surge, and gusty winds removed the tarps from roofs damaged previously by Hurricane Charley. In Dixie County along the Florida panhandle, Jeanne damaged 215 homes, destroying 15 of them. The storm also washed out 30 county roads.

==== Georgia ====
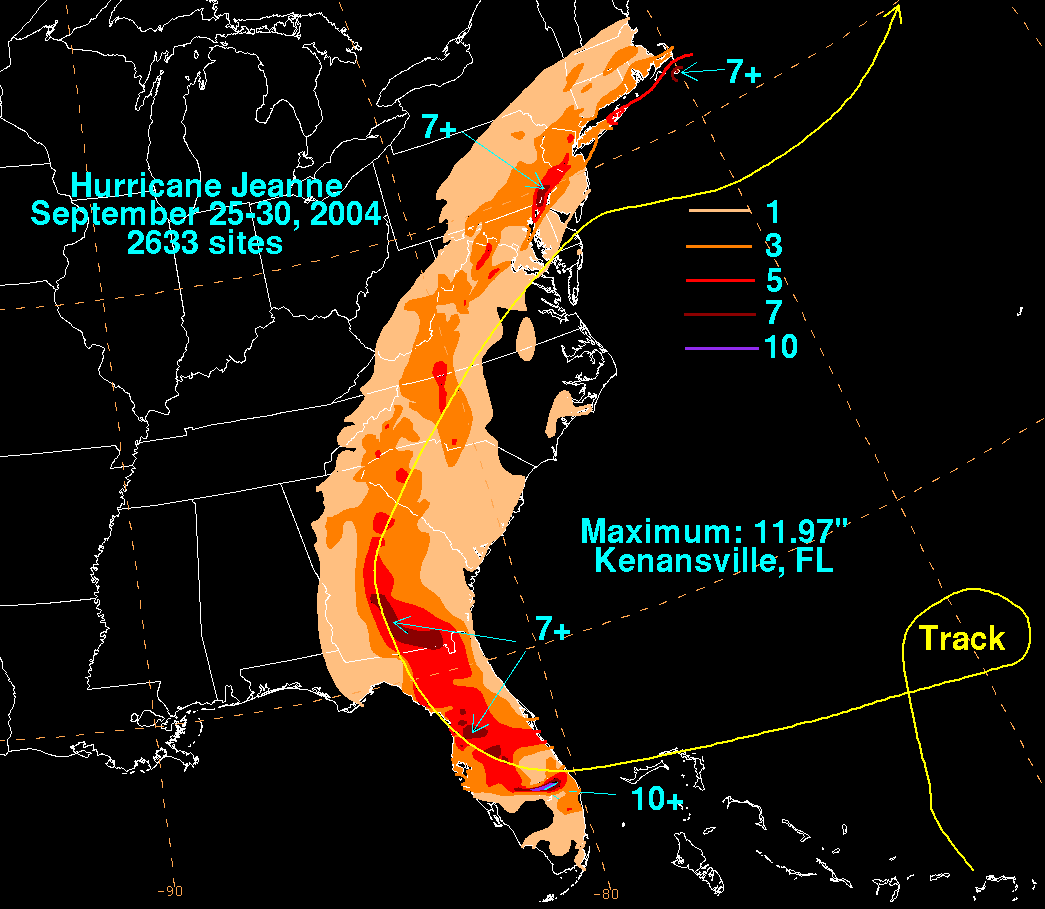
Rainfall totals from Jeanne in the United States

As Jeanne moved through the southeastern United States, it still produced gale-force wind gusts; Savannah/Hilton Head International Airport recorded wind gusts of 44 mph (71 km/h). The storm led to above-normal tides and beach erosion along the coast. The storm also spawned five weak tornadoes across Georgia, all of them rated F0. The first touched down briefly in a forest in northern Clinch County, snapping or knocking down at least 20 trees. Two tornadoes struck Bulloch County, one near Statesboro and the other near Portal; they both damaged a few trees. Weak tornadoes also touched down near Millhaven in Screven County and near Perkins in Jenkins County.

The storm also dropped heavy rainfall. The highest precipitation total in Georgia was 8.98 in (228 mm), recorded near Tifton. In southern Georgia, the rains produced flooding that washed out roads in Lowndes County, after the Withlacoochee River exceeded its banks. In Valdosta, around 700 people evacuated due to floods, and schools and businesses were closed. The rains, as well as gale-force wind gusts, knocked down trees and power lines, some of which fell onto homes. Around 36,000 people in the Valdosta area were without power. In Bibb County, dozens of trees fell, leaving 600 people without power and leading to one car accident. Near Macon, the interchange between I-75 and I-16 was flooded. Farther north in the Atlanta area, heavy rainfall produced floods along the Chattahoochee River, along with nearby creeks and streams. Both the Peachtree and Nancy creeks in Fulton County exceeded flood stage, which inundated nearby homes and businesses that were flooded ten days earlier by Hurricane Ivan. The river flooding covered parts of a golf course. In Gwinnett County, the heavy rains damaged the roof of an apartment complex, forcing at least 75 people to evacuate. A small lake in Union Point failed during the floods. Several minor roads across the area were washed out or closed. Damage in the Atlanta area reached $5 million.

==== Carolinas ====
While Jeanne was moving through the Bahamas, it produced rip currents that killed a swimmer in Murrells Inlet, South Carolina; five other people required rescue. During its passage through the southeastern United States, Jeanne produced a severe weather outbreak across the region, spawning 17 tornadoes in South Carolina. The most significant was an F2 that touched down near Ridgeway in Fairfield County, South Carolina. The twister destroyed five mobile homes while damaging two other homes, killing one person and injuring 13 others. There were six tornadoes that were rated F1. The first hit near Alcolu in Clarendon County, which destroyed two mobile homes and damaged a school, injuring four people. Near Lake City, a twister destroyed a barn and damaged a house. In Georgetown County, a tornado destroyed several sheds and outhouses, while also moving a mobile home off its foundation. In Marion County, a tornado damaged two homes, along with sheds and power lines. A twister in Newberry County damaged five houses. The final F1 tornado touched down near Gaffney, which destroyed a mobile home. The remaining ten tornadoes were all rated F0, which touched down in Hampton, Berkeley, Aiken, Lee, Chesterfield, Dillon, Marlboro, Saluda, Lexington, and one in Newberry. The tornado in Dillon County touched down along I-95. Jeanne's winds reached 41 mph (67 km/h) in Charleston. The wind gusts were strong enough to knock down trees and power lines, resulting in car crashes and injuries in both Jasper and Colleton counties.

The combination of high tides and heavy rainfall produced coastal flooding in Charleston. The highest precipitation in the state was 5.89 in (150 mm). The rains caused flooding along rivers and streams, especially near Greenwood and Abbeville. The floods damaged several roads and bridges, while also covering parts of interstates 26 and 385. Water from a drain forced an apartment building in Honea Path to evacuate. Several homes in Fountain Inn were also evacuated. Stranded drivers required rescue from the floodwaters in Spartanburg County.

Along the North Carolina coast, rip currents and high surf in North Carolina killed swimmers in Corolla in Currituck County and Oak Island in Brunswick County. During Jeanne's passage through the southeastern United States, there were seven tornadoes in North Carolina, none of them rated stronger than an F1. The first touched down twice along an 8 mi (13 km) path through Moore County, where it damaged 121 buildings, including eight that were destroyed. The twister also crossed four golf courses, knocked down hundreds of trees, and destroyed 12 cars. A brief F0 tornado, also in Moore County, knocked a tree onto a home. An F0 tornado touched down twice in Apex in Wake County, damaging a few power lines and mobile homes. A brief F0 tornado touched down in Richmond County, which downed a few trees and power lines. An F1 tornado hit near Oak City in Martin County, which blew the porch off a house and destroyed four large storage bins. In the town of Star in Montgomery County, an F0 tornado destroyed a chicken coop and moved a barn off its foundation, while also knocking a tree onto a home. An F1 tornado hit Patterson Springs in Cleveland County, knocking down several trees and power lines, some of which fell onto homes.

Jeanne also dropped heavy rainfall in the state, reaching 5.64 in (143 mm) at Clear Creek. The rains led to flash flooding in parts of the state, which flooded roads across the state such as I-40 and I-85. Several motorists in Rowan County required rescue after driving through floodwaters. An elementary school was flooded in Danbury in Stokes County. In Cabarrus County, a school was evacuated due to rising floodwaters, and several homes and businesses were flooded. Rainfall also extended into neighboring Tennessee, reaching 1.89 in (48 mm) in Del Rio.

==== Mid-Atlantic and New England ====
As Jeanne accelerated through the Mid-Atlantic, it continued producing heavy rainfall. The highest rainfall total in Virginia was 6.65 in (169 mm) in Woolwine in Patrick County. Flash flooding in the county killed a woman when her mobile home was washed off its foundation and moved downstream. Across the state, flooding closed portions of 435 roads. In Rockbridge County, 30 students were stranded after flooding cut off roads to their school. The heavy rainfall also produced mudslides, closing a portion of U.S. Route 220. Flash flooding caused rivers and creeks to rise. Near Buchanan in Botetourt County, the James River swelled to a level of 25.67 ft (7.82 m), 8.67 ft (2.64 m) above flood stage. In Roanoke, the Roanoke River reached its seventh highest level on record, prompting several residential evacuations. Businesses near the river were completely submerged underwater, and a nearby hotel required evacuation. An apartment complex was evacuated in nearby Salem. In Frederick County, portions of Interstate 81 and U.S. Route 50 were blocked off by floodwaters. Several roads were washed out in Fauquier County. During Jeanne's passage through the state, an F1 tornado took an intermittent 12.4 mi (20.0 km) path through Pittsylvania County. The twister caused one injury. Throughout the state, 292 structures were damaged, with at least $3.6 million in damage.

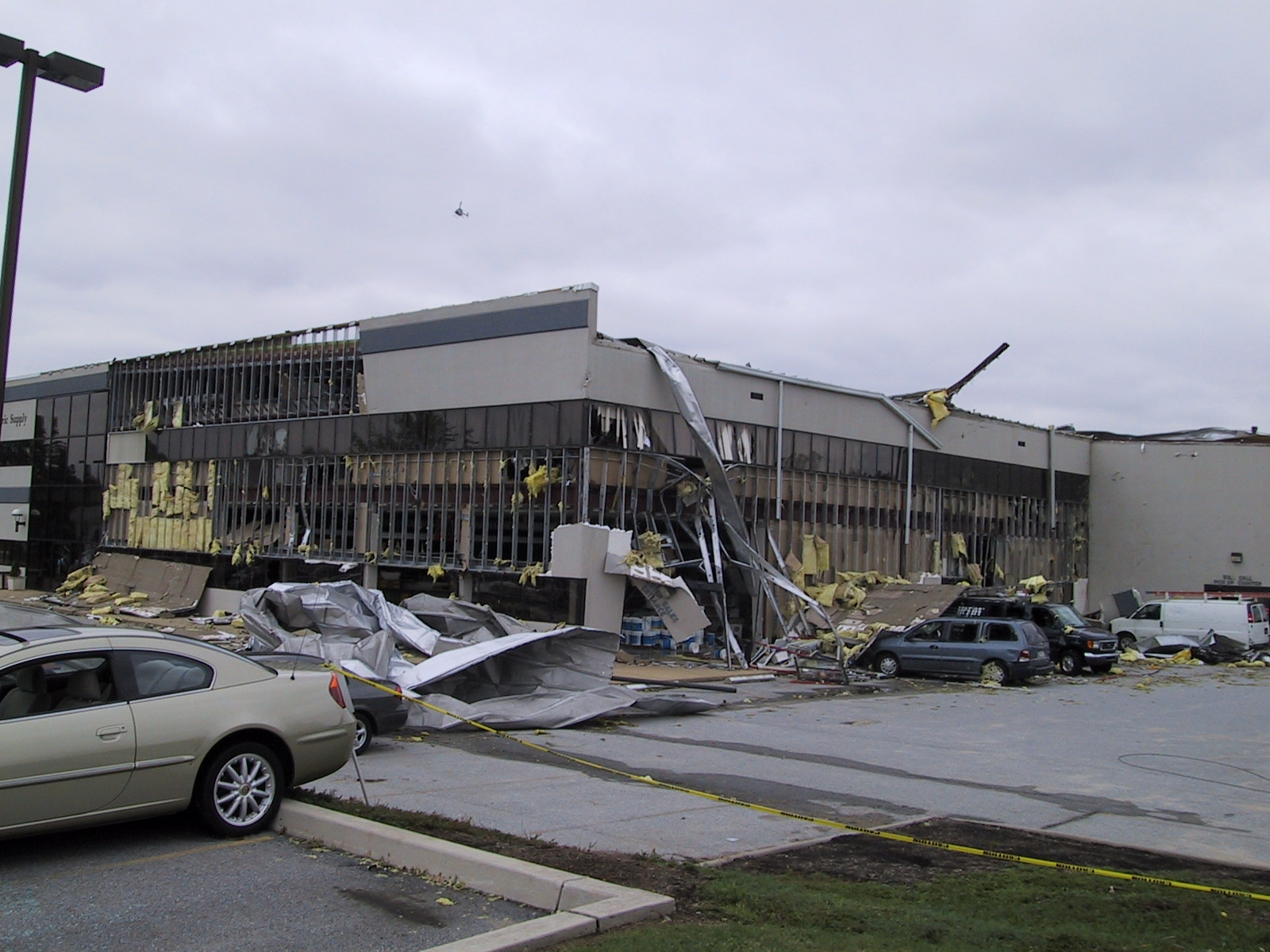
Damage from a tornado spawned by Hurricane Jeanne in Delaware

In neighboring West Virginia, rainfall from Jeanne reached 4.99 in (127 mm) in Union. The rains caused flooding in the eastern portion of the state, inundating portions of U.S. Route 11 and West Virginia Route 51. Fair Hill, Maryland, recorded 6.51 in (165 mm) of precipitation during the storm. The rains caused streams to flood, inundating 50 roads statewide. In Carroll County, a group of inmates required rescue after the jail they were in flooded. On Solomons Island, a waterspout moved ashore and became a brief F0 tornado, damaging the roof of a barn and the island's visitor center. Rainfall in Delaware reached 7.1 in (180 mm) in Newark. The rains led to flooding along the White and Red Clay Creeks, inundating roads and triggering evacuations. Residents in Glenville had to evacuated, and 40 people required rescue when a bus was stranded. There was also an F2 tornado in New Castle County, and it remained on the ground for about 5 mi (8.0 km), causing five injuries and leaving $1 million in damage. The tornado touched down near the county airport, damaging five planes and nearby hangars. The tornado also damaged a school, a self-storage facility, and several nearby homes.

In Pennsylvania, Jeanne's precipitation reached 8.97 in (228 mm) near West Chester. Roads and creeks were inundated across the region, and a woman drowned in the East Falls neighborhood of Philadelphia. Several abandoned buildings collapsed amid the floods, and damage in the city reached $2 million. The Brandywine Creek swelled 7 ft (2.1 m) above flood stage, resulting in swift water rescues and prompting emergency officials to open shelters. A commuter train of about 400 people was evacuated due to the floods. Several flights were canceled, and parts of I-76 were closed, drivers being rescued by boat. About 26,000 people lost power in the state. The hurricane's passage also caused minor tidal flooding along the Delaware River. In neighboring New Jersey, rainfall peaked at 6.3 in (160 mm) in Washington Crossing. Floods covered parts of several roads, including the Garden State Parkway, the New Jersey Turnpike, I-280, and U.S. 202. The flooding led to several water rescues, and several homes had to be evacuated in Union County. The combination of gusty winds and rainfall knocked a tree onto a home in Ewing Township. An F0 tornado touched down in Cherry Hill, damaging 13 buildings and several vehicles at a shopping center.

In neighboring New York, rainfall reached 5.48 in (139 mm) in Westhampton Beach. New York City had record daily rainfall amounts in several locations, including Central Park and Kennedy International Airport which measured 3.6 and 2.67 in (91 and 68 mm) respectively. These rains led to significant travel delays throughout the city and halted subway service on a few lines after water built up on some of the tracks. Floods closed roads across the region, including portions of I-87, the Brooklyn–Queens Expressway, the Belt Parkway, the Bronx River Parkway, the Henry Hudson Parkway, FDR Drive, and NY 440. The Metro-North Railroad suffered $2.8 million in damage from Hurricane Jeanne. Heavy rainfall extended into New England. Nantucket, Massachusetts, recorded 8.43 in (214 mm) of rainfall.

== Aftermath ==
As a result of the hurricane's impact, the name Jeanne was retired from the rotating lists of tropical cyclone names in the spring of 2005 by the World Meteorological Organization; the organization avoids reusing retired names for an Atlantic basin tropical cyclone. It was replaced with the name Julia for the 2010 season.

=== Haiti ===
After the deadly floods in Haiti, Prime Minister Gérard Latortue declared three days of national mourning. On September 22, members of the Haitian interim government, the United Nations, and the International Red Cross launched an appeal to the international community for donations. The flood-stricken city Gonaïves was without electricity or communications. Road access was cut off until September 20, when the UN peacekeeping mission, MINUSTAH, reopened the road. Haiti's Ministry of Agriculture shipped water from St. Marc to Gonaïves, with assistance from the local Red Cross. On September 20 and again on the following day, the World Food Programme (WFP) sent a fleet of 12 trucks to Gonaïves, carrying 40 tons of food and 5,000 loaves of bread each day. Workers used trucks, boats, mules, and donkeys to distribute food to nearby villages.

The streets of Gonaïves remained covered in mud and stagnant floodwaters for weeks after the storm. Due to damaged or blocked roads, Air Serv International helped transport relief workers to the hardest hit areas. After the disaster, CARE International provided meals to more than 278,000 people, equal to 961 metric tons of food, over a 12–day period. United Nations troops used gunfire to suppress looting at food distribution locations. Due to the insecurity, several nongovernmental organizations (NGOs) stopped their work in Gonaïves. Violence in Port-au-Prince, associated with protests supporting previous Haitian President Aristide, disrupted food transport for a week, until conditions became safer on October 7. There were at least four instances of aid trucks being attacked or looted by mid-November, and three WFP trucks that were hijacked in December. On December 31, a mob looted four metric tons of food from a food truck. On January 13, 2005, UN peacekeepers had to use tear gas after riots developed at a food distribution site. The damage from Jeanne, as well as subsequent drought conditions, diminished crop harvests in central Haiti by February 2005. In the six months after the storm, the WFP distributed 6,386 metric tons of food to people affected by the floods. Food distribution ended on March 14, 2005.

The World Health Organization (WHO) and Pan American Health Organization (PAHO) worked together to coordinate medical needs, providing personnel to assist local health departments and other humanitarian agencies. Teams from Médecins Sans Frontières, Cuba, and Argentina operated four field hospitals in Gonaïves, and Médecins du Monde opened a medical center. The Canadian and Norwegian Red Cross set up an emergency field hospital while also repairing one of the city's damaged hospitals. A team of Mexican health workers flew to Haiti to help with animal and bug control, as well as other illnesses. By October 18, health access in Gonaïves improved to the levels before the floods. A day later, emergency relief activities ended, although thousands of people remained homeless. The French Red Cross set up a water station capable of producing 7,900 US gallons (30,000 litres) of clean water each day. There were 20 water distribution sites by mid-October. Beginning mid-November, the Haitian Ministry of Health conducted a 37–day study of sick patients in Gonaïves, assisted by the United States Centers for Disease Control and Prevention. Although the survey did not detect any outbreaks of mosquito-borne diseases, the study detected the first two cases of West Nile virus in the country. UNICEF, or the UN's Children's Fund, helped restore 50 schools by the start of the 2005 school year.

Several countries and organizations helped Haiti in the storm's aftermath. The Organization of American States donated $25,000 to Haiti. The United States Agency for International Development (USAID) provided $38 million in assistance, as well as ongoing assistance after the country's floods in May 2004. The aid was distributed through a variety of agencies, while also setting up cash-for-work projects. The Canadian International Development Agency sent a flight with 14 tons of supplies to Haiti, while also donating $1 million to the WFP. The European Community Humanitarian Aid Office (ECHO) provided €4 million (US$3 million) (Note: Euro to U.S. dollar currency converted on the date of source publication) toward ongoing relief efforts in the country. Separately, Germany authorized €200,000 (US$162,000) and the Netherlands sent €250,000 (US$199,000). The British Red Cross provided hygiene kits, blankets, and kitchen sets. South Africa sent US$1 million to the Caribbean Disaster Emergency Response Agency toward disaster relief in the Caribbean. The government of Japan sent generators, jerrycans, and other supplies. The Australian Agency for International Development provided A$100,000 (US$70,000) (Note: Australian dollar to U.S. dollar currency converted on the date of source publication) to CARE Haiti. CARE helped restore water systems in Gonaïves, while also providing corn, bean and sorghum seeds to rural farmers. Workers from Hydro-Québec helped restore electricity to water irrigation pumps. The government of New Zealand sent NZ$100,000 (US$68,000) (Note: New Zealand dollar to U.S. dollar currency converted on the date of source publication) each to the United Nations Office for the Coordination of Humanitarian Affairs (OCHA) and UNICEF. The Gates Foundation donated $300,000 toward CARE's flood relief work in the country. The Adventist Development and Relief Agency International distributed shoes, medicine, and food, while also providing counseling services. Rise Against Hunger sent a boat with nearly $3 million in supplies, including food and medicine. Télécoms Sans Frontières set up temporary telephone access for about 2,000 families over a 19–day period. On December 14, 2004, Haitian musician Wyclef Jean released a music video for his song "Gonaïves", to raise awareness and funds for the WFP and Jean's charitable organization, Yéle Haiti.

In July 2005, the Inter-American Development Bank provided a $27.1 million loan to help farmers along the Rivière la Quinte by providing seeds and soil management. The Haitian government improved the country's disaster management agencies through the Emergency Recovery and Disaster Risk Management Project. It was a three-year program, supported by $19.4 million from the World Bank International Development Agency. The project helped reduce death tolls from tropical cyclones impacting Haiti in 2007 and 2008.

=== Bahamas ===
The passages of hurricanes Frances and Jeanne produced more than $550 million in damage and economic losses in the Bahamas, equating to about 10% of the country's GDP. Across the Bahamas, workers began clearing roads and restoring power after the storm passed. Due to the severe damage from Jeanne in Abaco and Grand Bahama islands, as well as previous damage from Hurricane Frances, Bahamian Prime Minister Perry Christie requested international assistance for rebuilding. The government of Japan provided ¥5.5 million worth of emergency supplies, including tents and generators.

=== United States ===
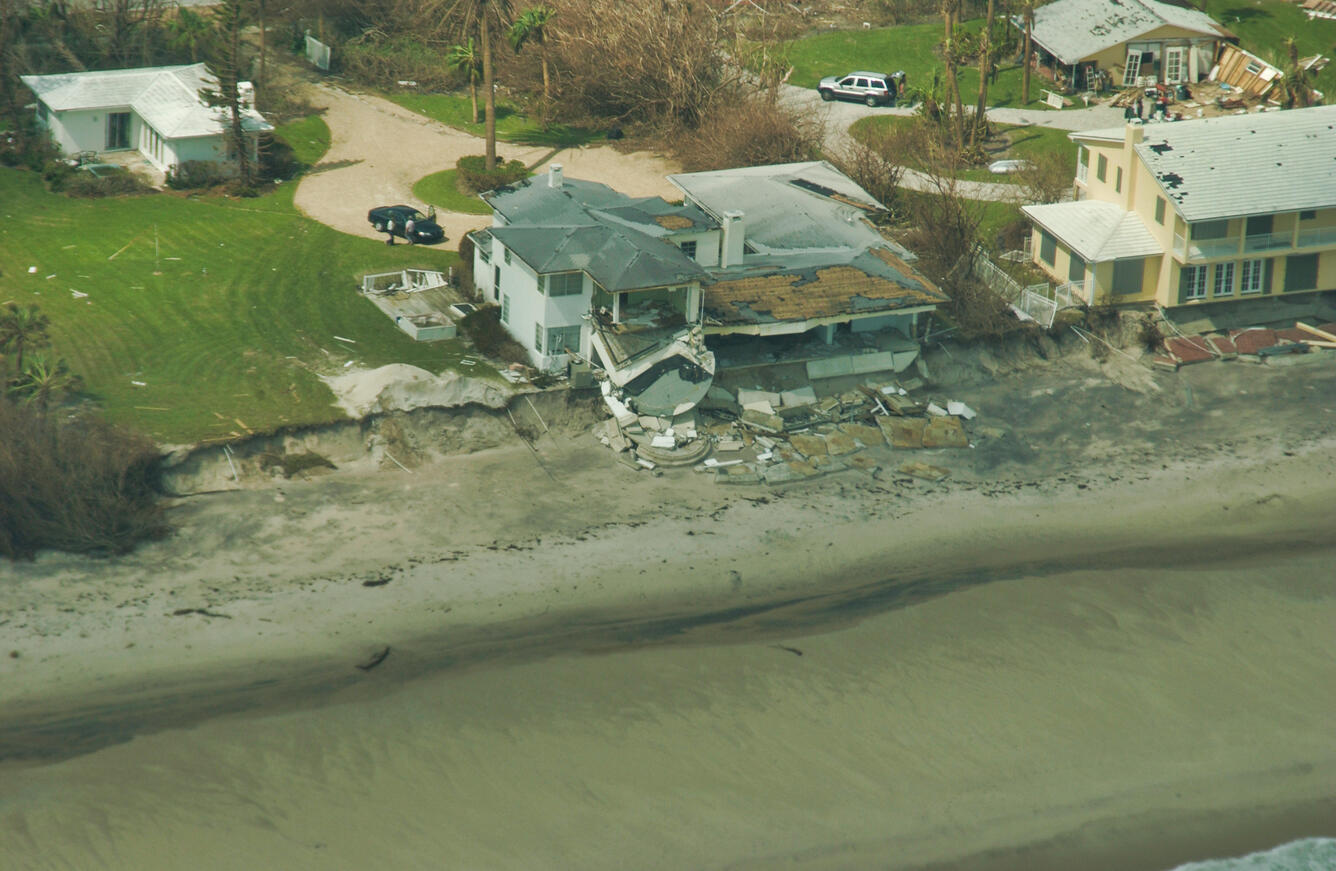
An aerial survey of storm damage in Stuart, Florida

Immediately after Jeanne's passage through Puerto Rico, electric companies began power restoration, repairing the western portion of the island first. United States President George W. Bush declared Puerto Rico a disaster area on September 17, two days after Jeanne struck the island. Ultimately, the federal government provided $457 million toward the disaster relief in Puerto Rico, which included emergency costs such as debris removal. The Federal Emergency Management Agency (FEMA) approved 159,978 individual assistance applications, which included temporary housing programs. FEMA opened six disaster recovery centers, while also operating mobile centers across the island. FEMA also provided counseling services for storm victims, and funds for repairing and upgrading roads, bridges, and electrical grids. President Bush also designated the United States Virgin Islands as a disaster area on October 7. The federal government provided about $1.7 million in disaster assistance. In January 2007, Congressman Alcee Hastings introduced the Haitian Protection Act of 2007, which would approve temporary protected status. Hastings cited the ongoing effects from Jeanne and other floods in 2004 as rationale for approving temporary protected status. The bill did not pass.

On September 26, the same day Jeanne moved ashore Florida, President Bush designated much of the state as a disaster area, covering all of the peninsula but Monroe County, and extending as far west as Wakulla County. Ultimately, FEMA spent $919 million toward the Hurricane Jeanne recovery in the state and approved individual assistance for 180,827 people. The collective effects of hurricanes Charley, Frances, and Jeanne damaged about one-third of the state's orange crop and two-thirds of the state's grapefruit. The hurricanes also resulted in increased costs for labor, after the migrant workers shifted from being citrus pickers to working in reconstruction. By ten years after the hurricanes, the citrus industry had not fully recovered, partly due to citrus greening disease. The collective response to hurricanes Charley, Frances, Ivan, and Jeanne represented the largest operations in the history of both the American Red Cross and FEMA. The previous largest FEMA operation was the response to the 1994 Northridge earthquake. Florida governor Jeb Bush deployed more than 3,000 national guard members to help with relief work. Occurring weeks before the 2004 U.S. presidential election, the hurricane had significant political implications for the state of Florida. The storm cutting off electricity in the state led to a lack of polling data, resulting in reduced campaign strategy by both candidates. More than 90 voting locations were damaged, causing them to be relocated or combined with another polling place. Due to the many damaged or destroyed homes, Governor Bush issued an executive order that allowed absentee ballots to be forwarded by mail.

Virginia governor Mark Warner declared a state of emergency due to Jeanne's damage in the state. On October 18, President Bush declared eight Virginia counties, as well as two cities, as a disaster area. FEMA provided $2.2 million in individual assistance to the state. In the days after the storm, local relief groups in Virginia began assisting residents with debris and mud removal as well as emotional support. On October 29, the Internal Revenue Service (IRS) and the Virginia Department of Taxation announced that they would provide deadline extensions for residents in disaster areas in western Virginia. The Virginia Employment Commission also announced that they would be assisting those who lost their jobs with acquiring a new one. Throughout the state, roughly $1.6 million was approved for 964 homeowners and businesses affected by Jeanne. Nearly $600,000 of these funds were granted for Salem City. New Castle County, Delaware, was also designated a federal disaster area on November 15. FEMA provided about $800,000 in public and emergency work.

== See also ==
- List of Category 3 Atlantic hurricanes
- List of Florida hurricanes (2000–present)
- Hurricanes in Hispaniola
- Timeline of the 2004 Atlantic hurricane season
