= Canot =

Canot may refer to:

== Rivers ==
- Rivière aux Canots (Métabetchouane River), a tributary of the Métabetchouane River in Quebec, Canada
- Rivière aux Canots (rivière aux Écorces), a tributary of the Rivière aux Écorces in Quebec
- Rivière du Canot, a tributary of the Gatineau River in Quebec
- Rivière Canot, Haiti, a tributary of the Artibonite River

== People ==
- Pierre-Charles Canot (1710–1777), French engraver based in London
- Théodore Canot (1804–1860), slave trader and writer

== See also ==
- Canoe
