= Nipple (disambiguation) =

A nipple is part of the breast, in anatomy.

Nipple may also refer to:

- Nipple or teat, on a baby bottle

== Engineering ==
- Nipple (plumbing), a type of pipe fitting
- Spoke nipple, which binds each spoke to a bicycle wheel rim
- Grease nipple, used to put grease into a gearbox or moving part needing lubrication using a grease gun
- Nipple mouse, a pointing device on a laptop
- Nipple (firearm), in a percussion firearm, it is an extension of the touch hole to which a percussion cap is fitted.
- Nipple, on the end of a Bowden cable
- Nipple, the fifth wheel coupling kingpin on a semi-trailer

== Music ==
- Nipple (album), a 1994 album by the Claw Boys Claw
- Nipples (Peter Brötzmann album), 1969

== See also ==
- The Nipple, a mountain in California
- Nippes (disambiguation)
