= Saut-Mathurine =

- Interactive map of Saut-Mathurine
- Location: Camp-Perrin, Haiti
- Coordinates: 18°22′10″N 73°50′58″W
- Watercourse: Rivière de Cavaillon

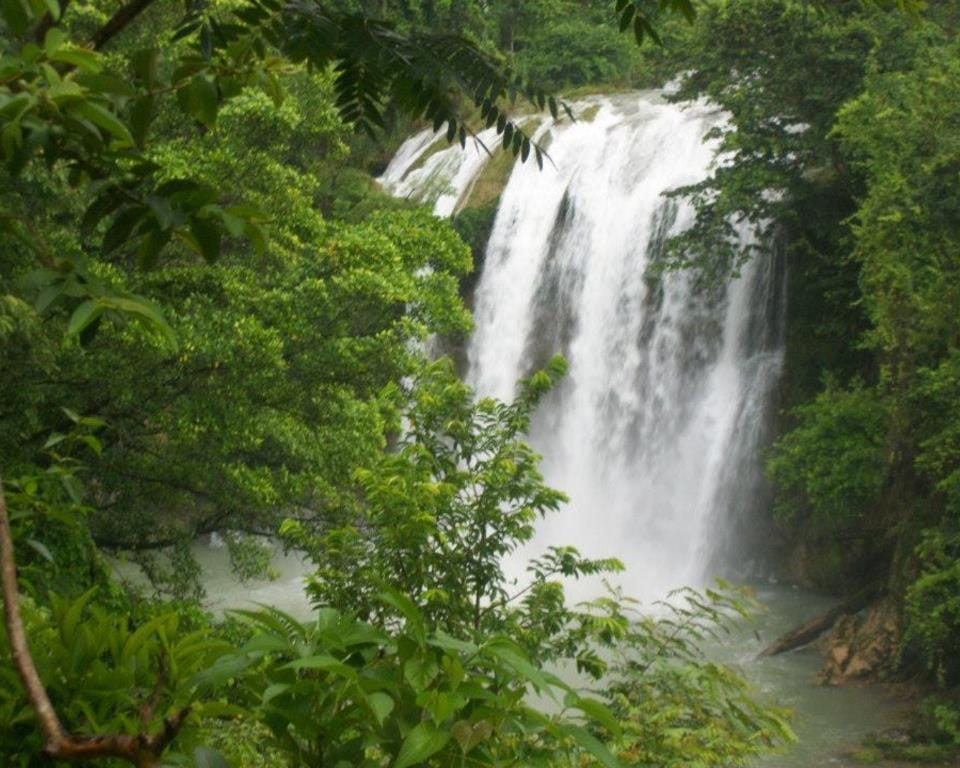
Saut Mathurine

Saut-Mathurine (French pronunciation: [so matyʁin]) is a waterfall in Haiti located in Camp-Perrin, Sud. The source of its stream of water comes from the Rivière de Cavaillon.

== See also ==
- List of waterfalls
