= Rivière Lociane =

Coordinates: 19°04′N 71°44′W

Location
- Country: Haiti

The Rivière Lociane or L'Océane is a river of Haiti.

== See also ==
- List of rivers of Haiti
