= Agua Azul =

Cataracts on the Xanil River in Chiapas, Mexico

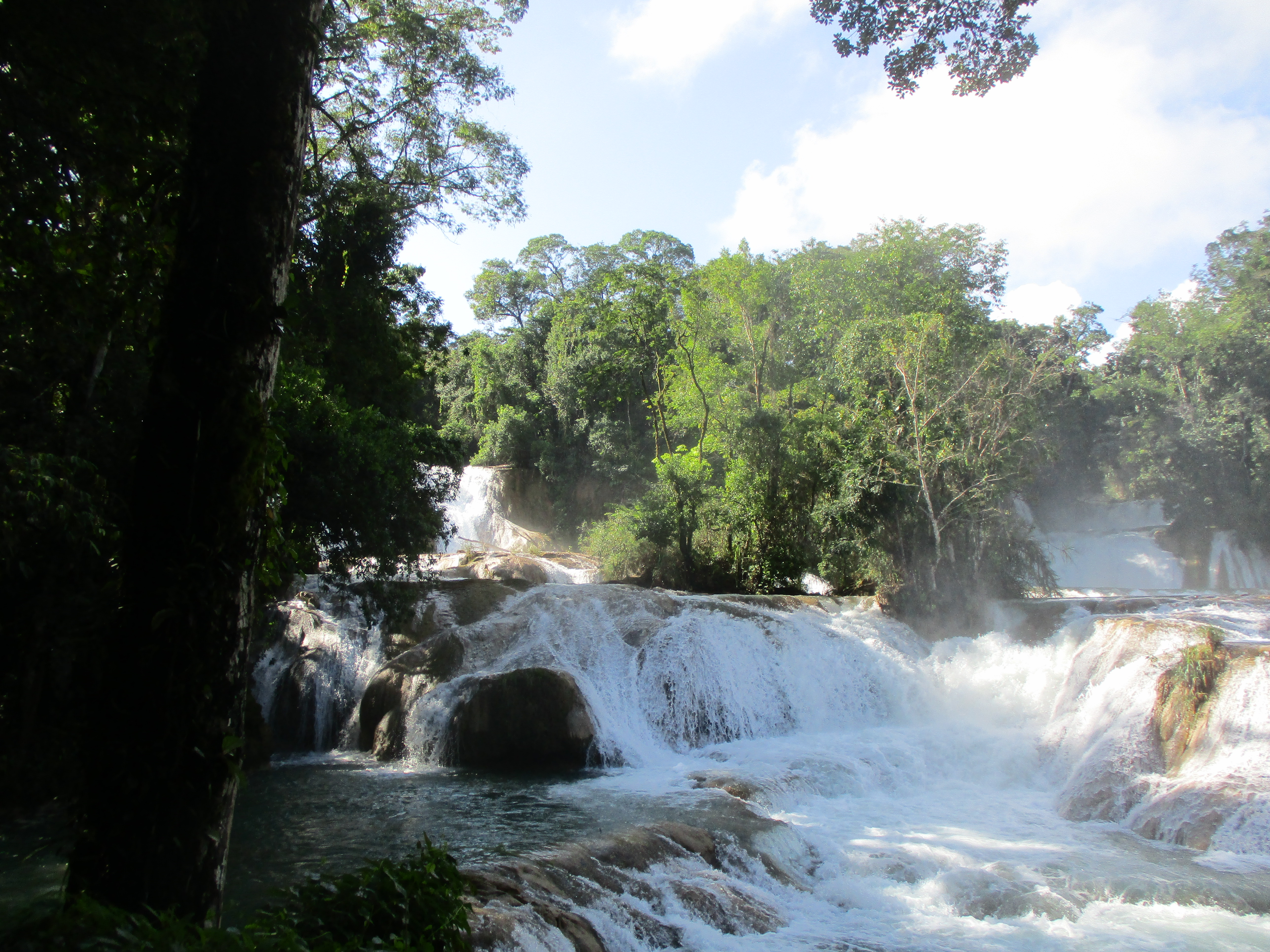

- Location within Mexico
- Location: Tumbalá, Chiapas, Mexico
- Coordinates: 17°15′21″N 92°06′57″W
- Number of drops: Various
- Longest drop: 6 m (20 ft)
- Watercourse: Agua Azul river → Río Shumula → Río Tulijá → Río Chilapa → Río Grijalva

The Cascadas de Agua Azul (Spanish for "Blue Water waterfall") are a series of waterfalls found on the Xanil River in the southern Mexican state of Chiapas. They are located in the Municipality of Tumbalá, 69 kilometres (43 mi) from Palenque, near Mexican Federal Highway 199.

These waterfalls consist of many cataracts following one after another, taken from near the top of the sequence of cascades. The larger cataracts may be as high as 6 meters (20 feet) or so. During much of the distance, the water descends in two streams, with small islands in the middle.

The water has a high content of calcium carbonate and other minerals, and where it falls on rocks or fallen trees, it encases them in a thick shell-like coating of limestone.

The area was designated a flora and fauna protection area in 2000 by the Mexican government. The protected area covers 25.8 km^{2}.

Residents reportedly restored the waterfalls after the 2017 Chiapas earthquake has created a crack and led to a temporary reduction of the water flow over the falls.

== Gallery ==
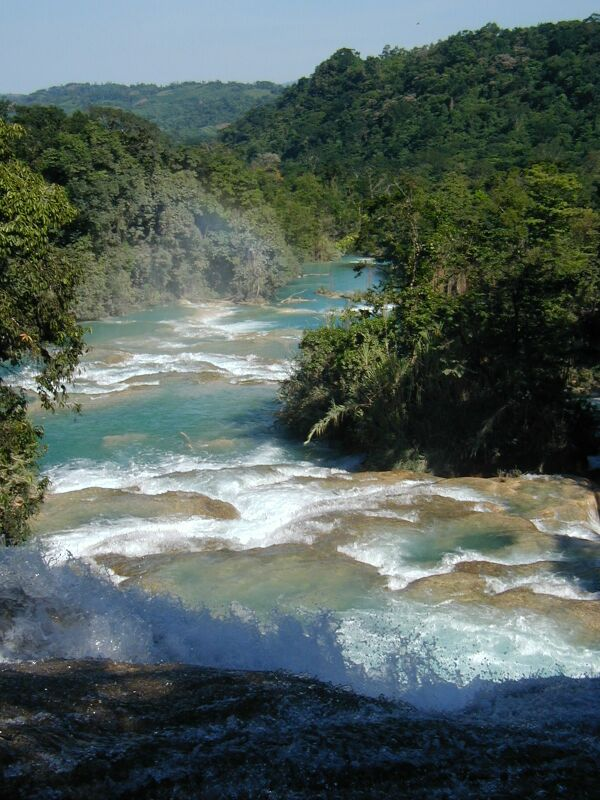
The series of Agua Azul cascades seen from the top

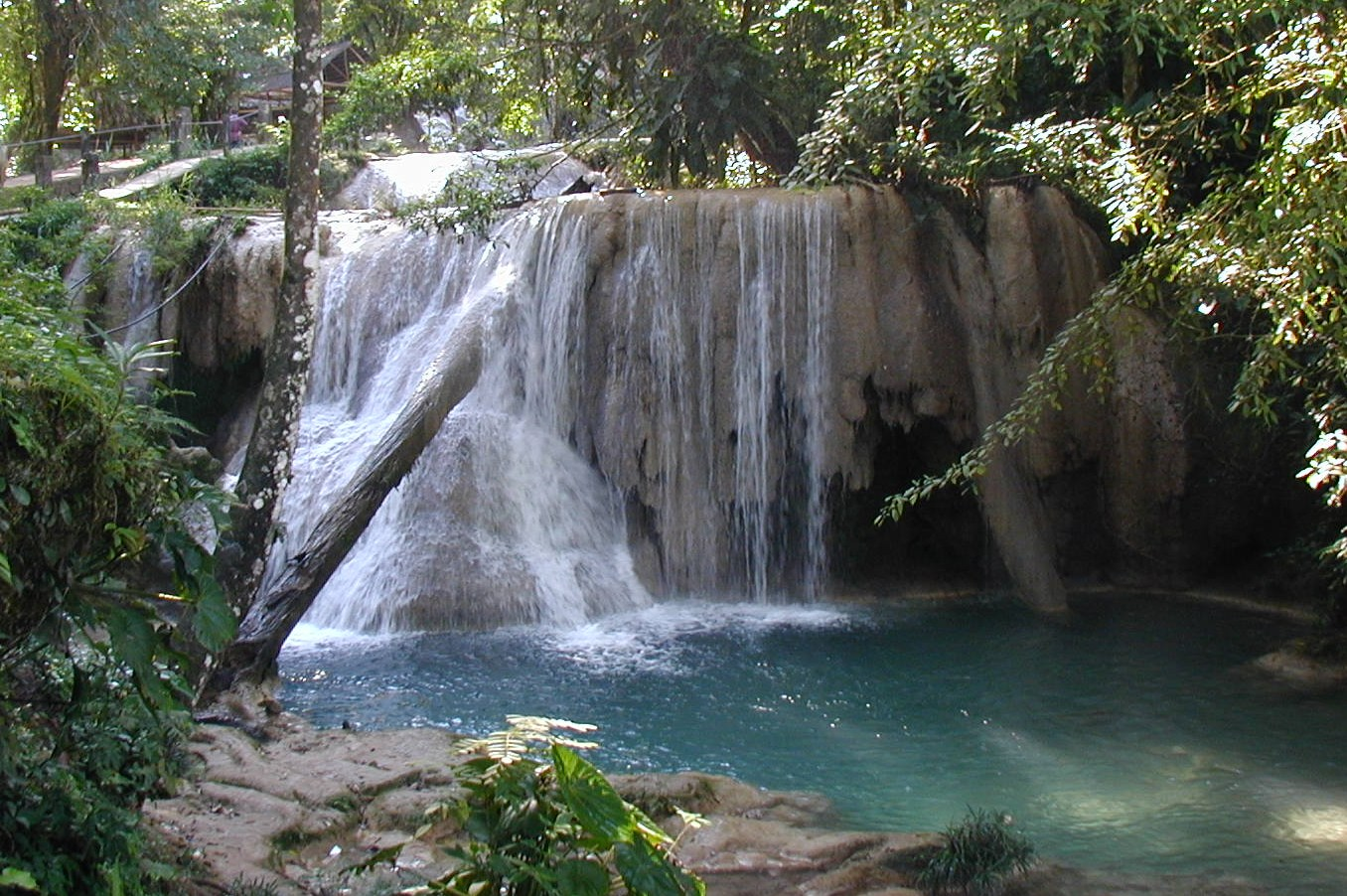
Trees in different stages of calcification

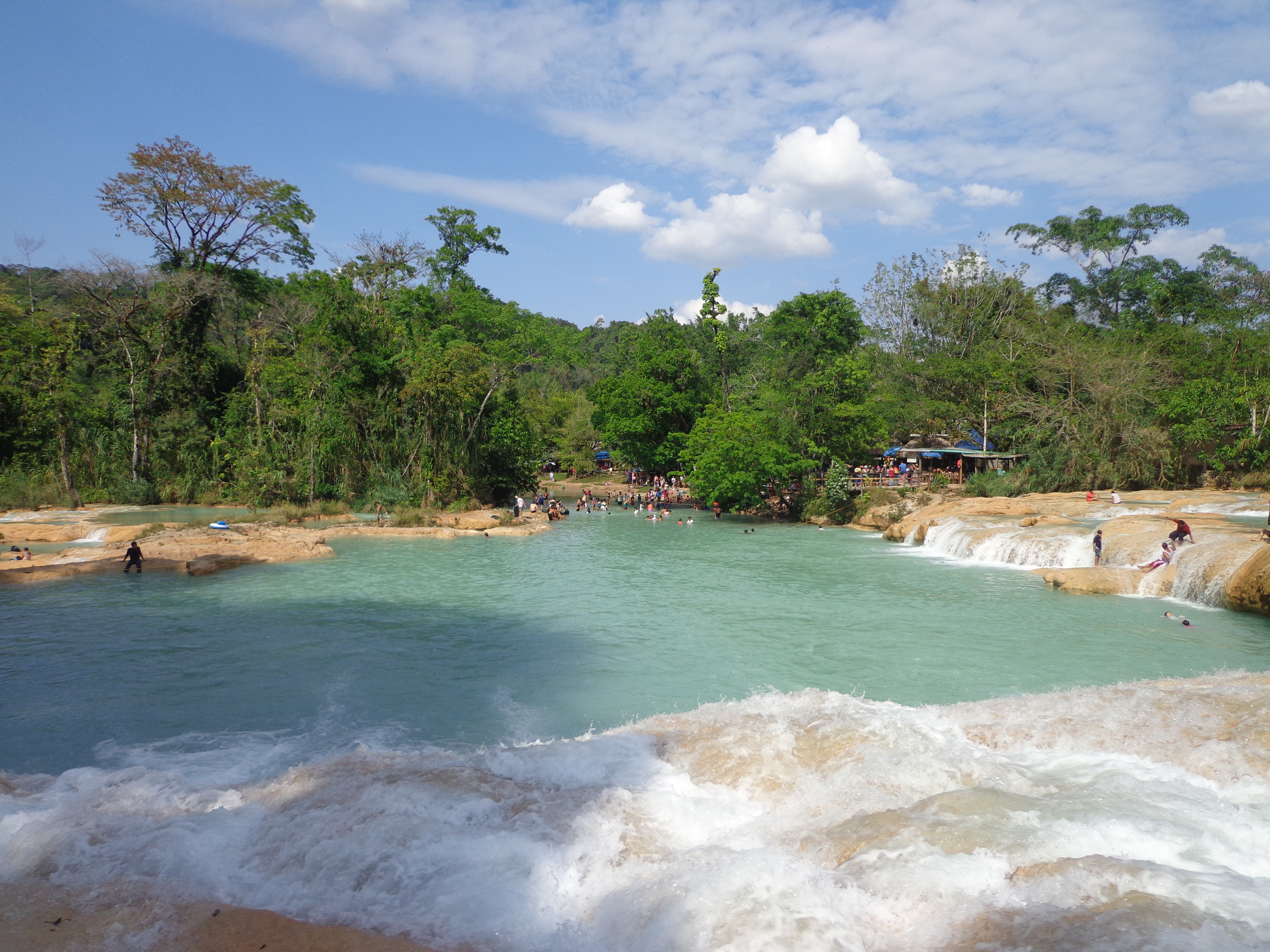
Xanil River basin

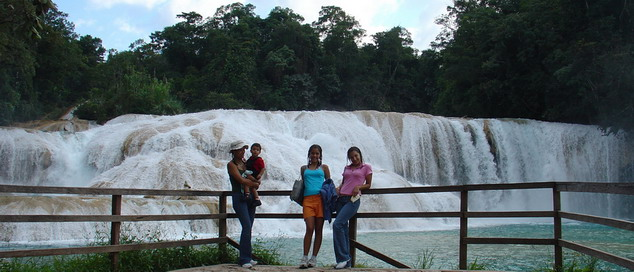

== See also ==
- List of waterfalls
