= Grande Rivière de Jacmel =

Coordinates: 18°14′N 72°33′W

Grande Rivière de Jacmel Rivière de la Cosse
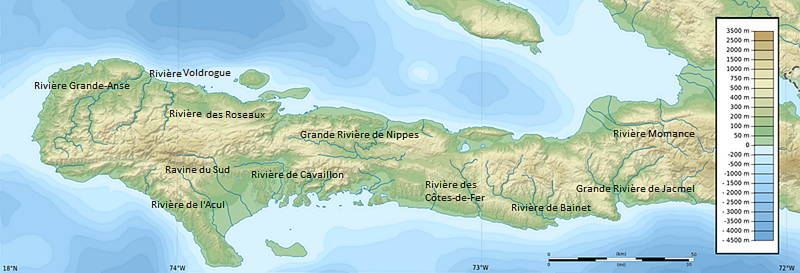

Location
- Country: Haiti

Physical characteristics
- Mouth
  - location: Jacmel

The Grande Rivière de Jacmel (French pronunciation: [ɡʁɑ̃d ʁivjɛʁ də ʒakmɛl]) or Rivière de la Cosse ([ʁivjɛʁ də la kɔs]), is a river in Haiti. It is approximately 45 kilometers long.

== See also ==
- List of rivers of Haiti
