= List of rivers of Haiti =

This is a list of rivers of Haiti, arranged by drainage basin, with respective tributaries indented under each larger stream's name.

== Atlantic Ocean ==
- Dajabón River (Massacre River)
- Grande Rivière du Nord
- Rivière du Limbè
- Les Trois Rivières
- Rivière des Baradères

== Gulf of Gonâve ==
- Rivière la Quinte
- Rivière l’Estère
- Artibonite River
  - Rivière de Fer à Cheval
  - Macasía River
  - Guayamouc River
    - Rivière Bouyaha
    - Rivière Canot
  - Rivière Lociane
  - Libón River
- Rivière de Saint-Marc
- Rivière Montrouis
- Rivière Blanche (Artibonite)
- Rivière Blanche (Ouest)
- Rivière Grise (Grande Riviere du Cul de Sac)
- Momance River
- Rivière de Grand Goâve
- Grande Rivière de Nippes
- Grande-Anse River

== Caribbean Sea ==
- Acul River
- Ravine du Sud
- Rivière de Cavaillon
- Rivière des Côtes de Fer
- Rivière de Bainet
- Grande Rivière de Jacmel
- Petite Rivière de Jacmel
- Pedernales River
