= Nippes (disambiguation) =

Nippes may refer to:

- Nippes, Haiti
- Nippes, Cologne, a district of Cologne, Germany
- Grande Rivière de Nippes, a Haitian river also known as the Nippes River
- A. S. Nippes, the initial manufacturer of the Sharps rifle
