= Rivière de Bainet =

Coordinates: 18°11′N 72°45′W

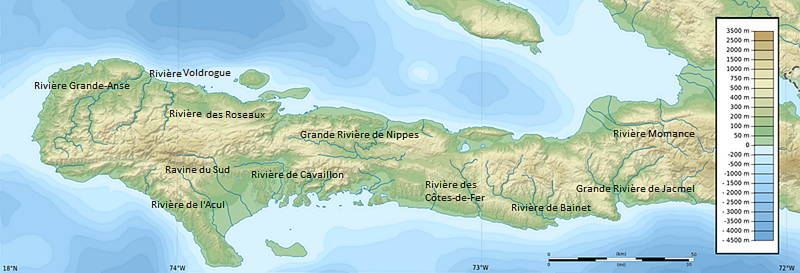

Location
- Country: Haiti

The Rivière de Bainet is a river of Haiti.

== See also ==
- List of rivers of Haiti
