= Ravine du Sud =

Coordinates: 18°11′N 73°45′W

Ravine River
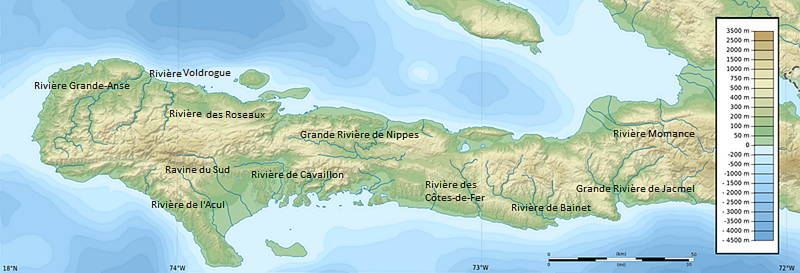

Location
- Country: Haiti

Physical characteristics
- Mouth
  - location: Les Cayes
- Length: 34 km (21 mi)

The Ravine du Sud (French pronunciation: [ʁavin dy syd]; also known as La Ravine du Sud or the Ravine River) is a river of Haiti. The river flows through the Pic Macaya National Park.

== See also ==
- List of rivers of Haiti
