= Rivière des Côtes de Fer =

Coordinates: 18°11′N 73°00′W

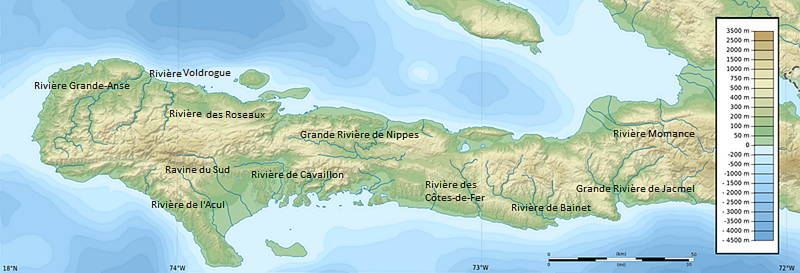

Location
- Country: Haiti

The Rivière des Côtes de Fer (French pronunciation: [ʁivjɛʁ de kot də fɛʁ]) is a river in Haiti.

== See also ==
- List of rivers of Haiti
