= Rivière Grise =

Coordinates: 18.483°N 72.184°W

Location
- Country: Haiti

The Rivière Grise (French pronunciation: [ʁivjɛʁ ɡʁiz]) is a river of Haiti.

== See also ==
- List of rivers of Haiti
