= Rivière de Saint-Marc =

Coordinates: 19°07′N 72°42′W

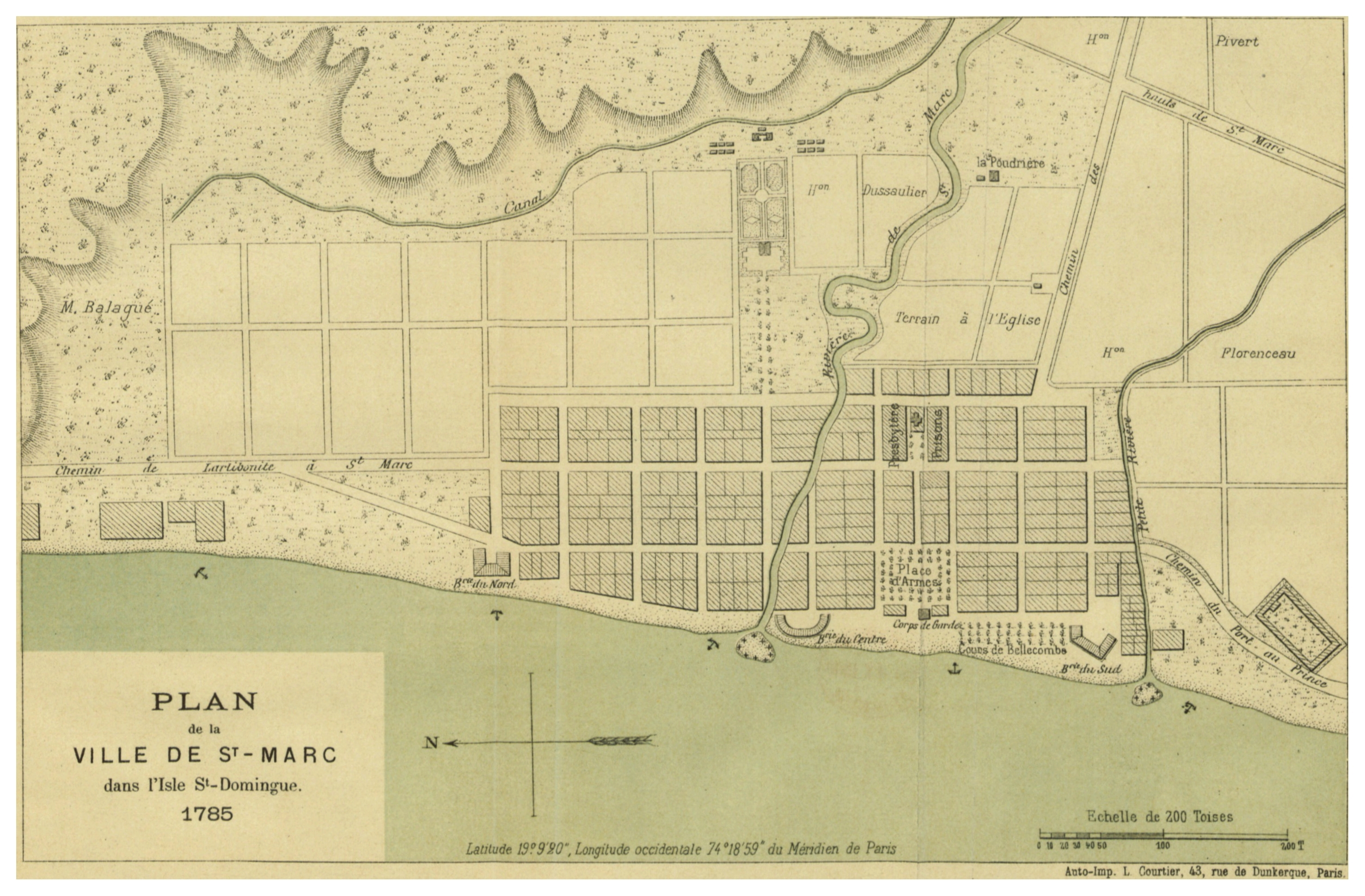

Location
- Country: Haiti

The Rivière de Saint-Marc is a river of Haiti.

== See also ==
- List of rivers of Haiti
