= Rivière du Limbé =

Coordinates: 19°48′N 72°24′W

Location
- Country: Haiti

The Rivière du Limbé (French pronunciation: [ʁivjɛʁ dy lɛ̃be]) is a river of Haiti.

== See also ==
- List of rivers of Haiti
