= Rivière Bouyaha =

Coordinates: 19°10′N 72°04′W

Location
- Country: Haiti

The Rivière Bouyaha is a river of Haiti.

Bouyaha River, in French riviere Bouyaha, is a river flowing through the cities of Dondon, Saint Raphael and Pignon. It is said that the river started in the mountain surrounding the municipalities of Dondon and Marmelade. Bouyaha river merges with the guayamouc river in the nearby city of Hinche.

== See also ==
- List of rivers of Haiti
