= Rivière Montrouis =

Coordinates: 18°57′N 72°43′W

Location
- Country: Haiti

The Rivière Montrouis is a river of Haiti.

== See also ==
- List of rivers of Haiti
