= Rivière l'Estère =

Coordinates: 18.8831°N 72.0831°W

Location
- Country: Haiti

The Rivière l'Estère (French pronunciation: [ʁivjɛʁ lɛstɛʁ]) is a river of Haiti.

== See also ==
- List of rivers of Haiti
