= Les Trois Rivières =

Coordinates: 19°57′N 72°52′W

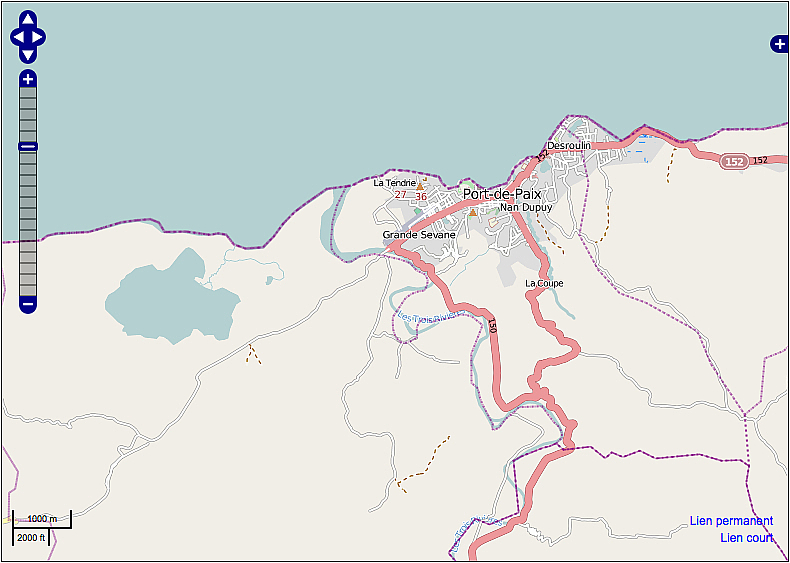

Location
- Country: Haiti

The Les Trois Rivières (French pronunciation: [le tʁwa ʁivjɛʁ], lit. 'The Three Rivers') is a river of Haiti. Its source is in the Massif du Nord (Northern Massif). It then passes through the cities of Plaisance and Pilate.

The river then runs to Port-de-Paix and flows on the outskirts of the port city between the communities of Red Wood and Paulin, facing Tortuga. Finally it flows into the Atlantic Ocean just after crossing the Port-de-Paix airport.

== See also ==
- List of rivers of Haiti
