= Xanil =

River in southeastern Mexico

Coordinates: 17°26′01″N 92°11′45″W

Xanil River (Río Xanil)
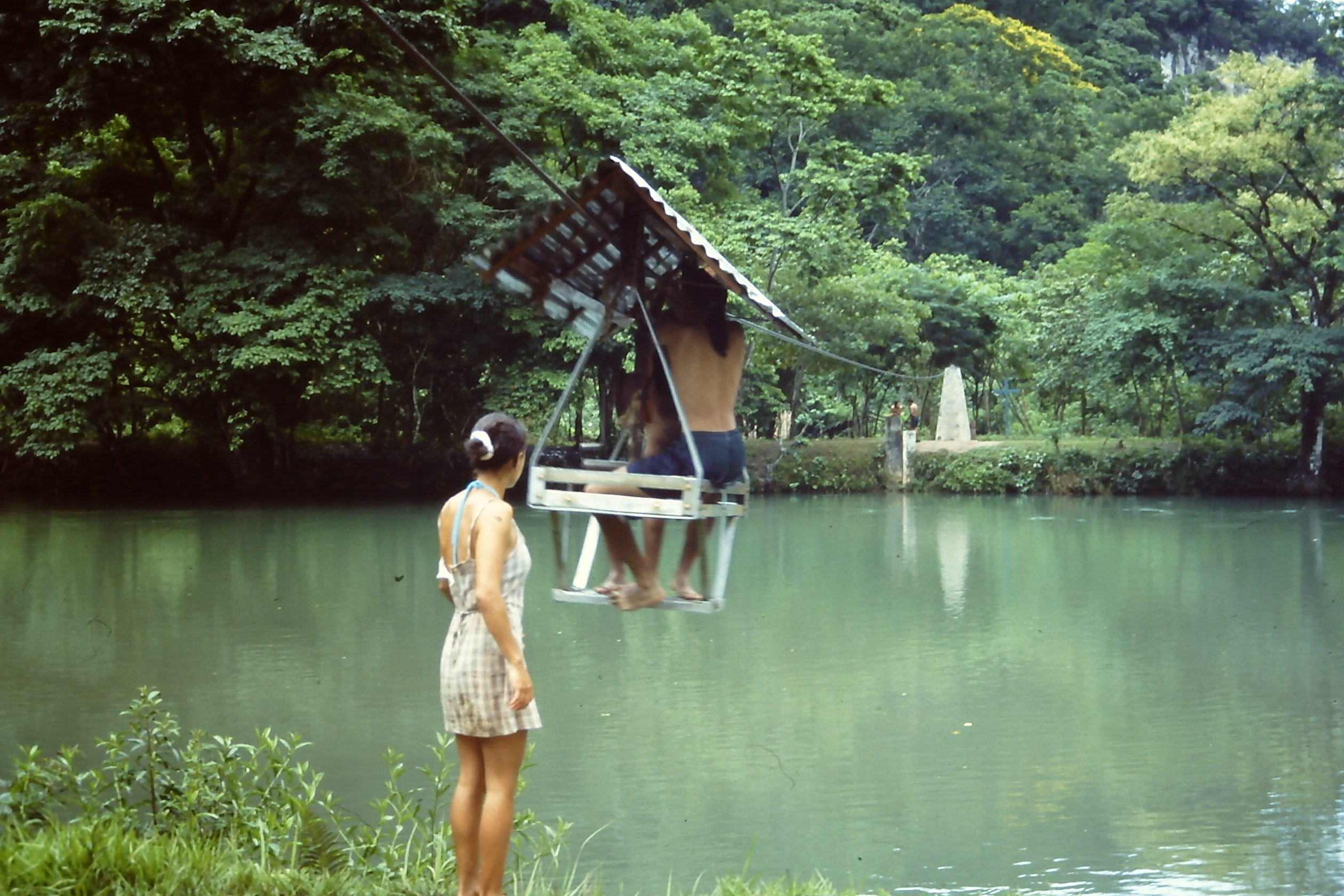
- Xanil River close to Agua Azul, Chiapas, Mexico

Location
- Country: Mexico

Physical characteristics
- Source
  - location: Mexico
- Mouth
  - location: Río Shumula → Tulija River → Grijalva River
- Length: 30 km (19 mi)

Xanil River, (Spanish: Río Xanil), Saquilukun or downstream Agua Azul River (Spanish: Río Agua Azul) is an approximately 30 km long river in southeastern Mexico. The river rises in the Chiapas Highlands and flows from Chiapas to the state of Tabasco into the Tulija River. Its name originates from the village with spa (balneario) of the same name Xanil, which lies at the highway from Palenque to Ocosingo.

In 2017 water flow at Cascadas de Agua Azul was found to be drastically reduced, due to a new embankment of the river, endangering the rivers ecosystem.

== Gallery ==
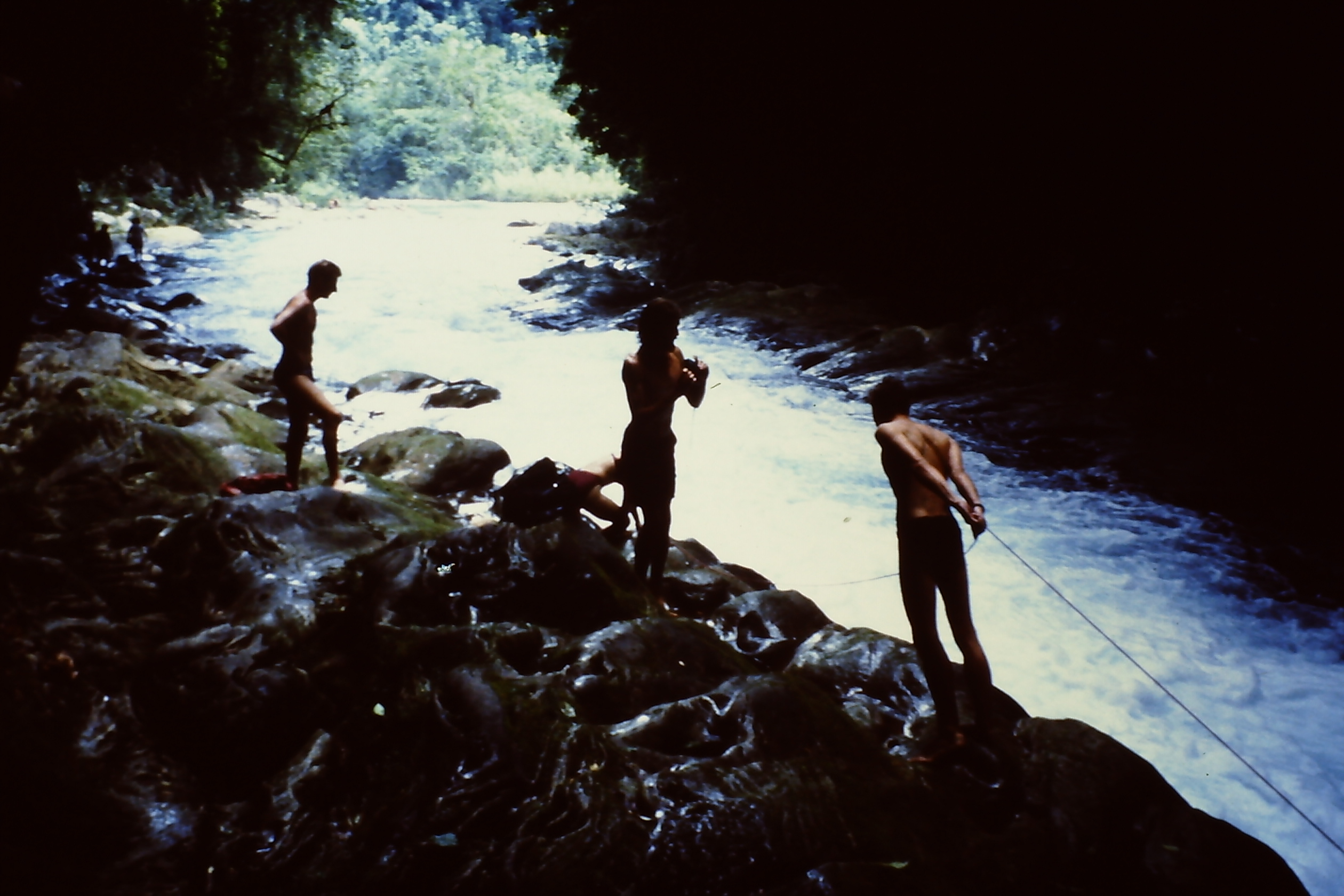
Canyoning upstream of Agua Azul

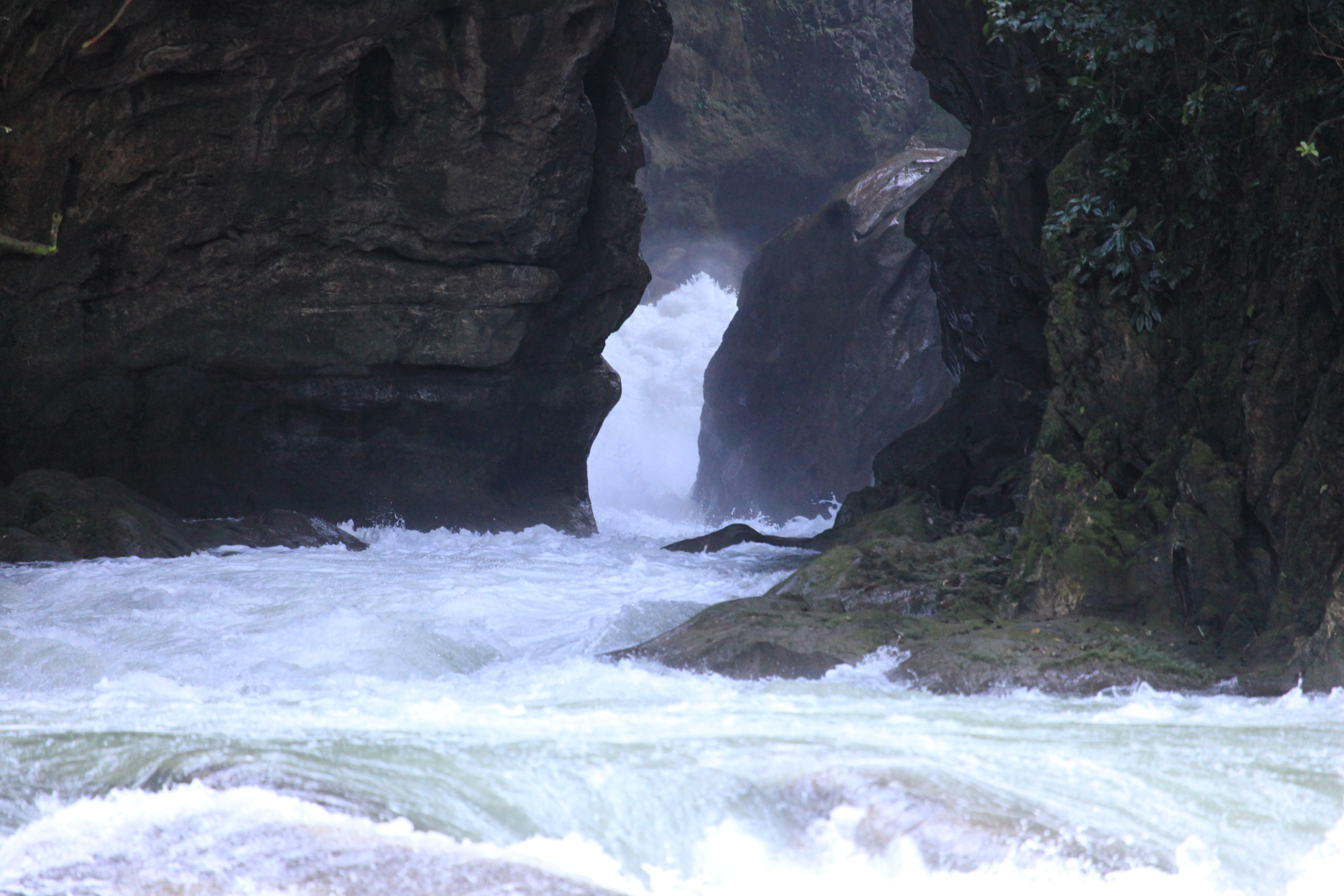
Canyon exit La Boquilla upstream of Agua Azul

== See also ==
- Rio Grijalva
- Agua Azul Cascades
