= Rivière la Quinte =

Coordinates: 19°24′N 72°41′W

Location
- Country: Haiti

The Rivière la Quinte (French pronunciation: [ʁivjɛʁ la kɛ̃t]) is a river of Haiti.

== See also ==
- List of rivers of Haiti
