= Grande Rivière de Nippes =

Coordinates: 18°29′N 73°18′W

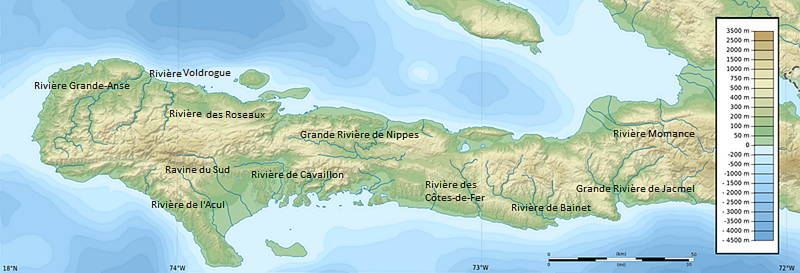

Location
- Country: Haiti

The Grande Rivière de Nippes (French pronunciation: [ɡʁɑ̃d ʁivjɛʁ də nip]; Haitian Creole: Grann Rivyè de Nip) is a river of Haiti.

== See also ==
- List of rivers of Haiti
