= Rivière Canot =

Coordinates: 19.1700°N 72.0670°W

Location
- Country: Haiti

The Rivière Canot is a river of Haiti.

== See also ==
- List of rivers of Haiti
