= Acul River =

Coordinates: 18°07′N 73°51′W

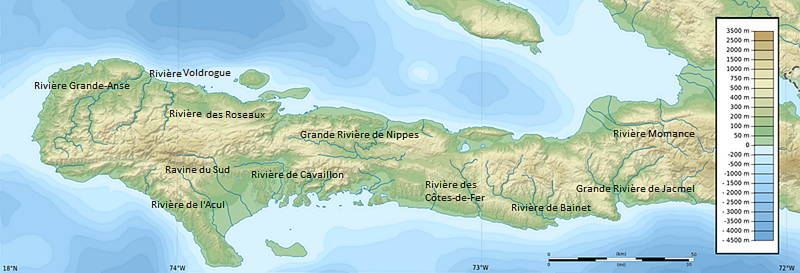
- Acul River in the South West of Haiti

Location
- Country: Haiti

The Acul River is a river of Haiti.

== See also ==
- List of rivers of Haiti
