= Rivière du Canot =

- Location within Quebec

Location
- Country: Canada
- Province: Quebec
- Region: Mauricie
- Regional County Municipality (Equivalent): La Tuque

Physical characteristics
- Source: Lac du Canot
  - location: La Tuque
  - coordinates: 47.765151°N 75.133241°W
  - elevation: 482 m (1,581 ft)
- Mouth: Gatineau River
  - location: Lac-De La Bidière
  - coordinates: 47.55611°N 75.31084°W
  - elevation: 312 m (1,024 ft)
- Length: 33.4 km (20.8 mi)
- Discharge
  - location: Lac-De La Bidière

Basin features
- Tributaries
  - right: az

The rivière du Canot is a stream flowing in the territory of La Tuque, in the administrative region of Mauricie, and will drain into the Gatineau River in the unorganized territory of Lac-De La Bidière, in the Antoine-Labelle Regional County Municipality, in the administrative region of Laurentides, in Quebec, in Canada.

== Geography ==
The hydrographic slopes neighboring the Canot river are:

- north side: La Choquette, Brossard Lake;
- east side: rivière aux Bleuets;
- south side: Gatineau River;
- west side: Choquette River.

Lac du Canot (length: 2.5 km (1.6 mi) in an east-west direction; altitude: 482 m (1,581 ft)) is the main head water body of the Rivière du Canot. This body of water is located 1.9 km (1.2 mi) west of the rivière aux Bleuets which flows south.

From Lac du Canot, the Rivière du Canot runs 5.7 km (3.5 mi) southwest through three lakes, up to two outlets (southeast and northwest), the mouths of which are almost opposite. -screw. Then the river flows 7.3 km (4.5 mi) south through many rapids, to the outlet of Lake Bennett.

From this confluence, the Canot River flows 11.1 km (6.9 mi) southwest through several zones of rapids, to the outlet (coming from the east) of Lac Rond (altitude: 356 m (1,168 ft)). The Rivière du Canot crosses a final segment of 9.3 km (5.8 mi) south, to its confluence with the Gatineau River where the latter forms a bend from the west and redirecting southerly.

In its upper part, the Canot river flows to the southwest, more or less in parallel (on the west side) with the rivière aux Bleuets.

== Toponymy ==
The canoe is a generally light, multi-purpose boat that has been widely used to navigate rivers in American history. The characteristics of the canoe make it useful especially for portages, shelter by forming a tent and especially navigate in shallow waters. The explorers of this region referred to this means of river transport to designate this river.

The toponym Rivière du Canot was formalized on December 5, 1968 at the Place Names Bank of the Commission de toponymie du Québec.

== See also ==
- La Tuque, a city
- Antoine-Labelle Regional County Municipality
- Gatineau River, a stream
- Rivière aux Bleuets (Bazin River), a stream
- Choquette River, a stream
- List of rivers of Quebec
