= Rivière de Cavaillon =

Coordinates: 18°14′N 73°41′W

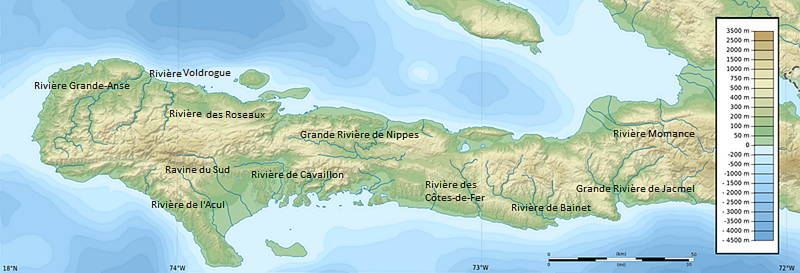

Location
- Country: Haiti

The Rivière de Cavaillon (French pronunciation: [ʁivjɛʁ də kavajɔ̃]) is a river of Haiti.

== See also ==
- List of rivers of Haiti
