= List of populated places affected by the 2010 Haiti earthquake =

This is a list of populated places and structures affected by the 2010 Haiti earthquake, a magnitude 7.0 M_{w} earthquake that occurred on 12 January 2010, with an epicentre approximately 25 km (16 mi) west of Port-au-Prince, Haiti, and affected an estimated three million people. The Haitian government estimated that 230,000 people died, 300,000 were injured and 1,000,000 made homeless by the quake.

The earthquake caused extensive damage to infrastructure in southwestern Haiti—in February, Prime Minister Jean-Max Bellerive estimated that 250,000 residences and 30,000 commercial buildings had collapsed or were severely damaged. The deputy mayor of Léogâne, at the epicentre of the earthquake, reported that 90 percent of buildings in the city were destroyed and Léogâne had "to be totally rebuilt." As much as 90 percent of Grand-Goâve was devastated, including all public buildings. In Gressier, 40–50 percent of buildings were destroyed; the same in the worst-affected areas of Carrefour. Jacmel, the capital of Sud-Est department, also was heavily affected; 70 percent of homes in the city were damaged according to the mayor of Jacmel, as well as the airport, hospital and city hall building.

Many landmark buildings were damaged or destroyed, including the Presidential Palace, the National Assembly building (Palais Législatif), the Supreme Court building (Palais de Justice) and the Holy Trinity and Port-au-Prince Cathedrals. Port-au-Prince's main port and airport, the Port international de Port-au-Prince and Toussaint Louverture International Airport also suffered severe damage, as did Killick, the Haitian Coast Guard's base in the capital city. The Ciné Institute, Haiti's only film school, "lost two buildings".

== Populated places ==
=== Ouest department ===
Populated place	Haitian Creole	Arrondissement	Notes
Bel Air	Bèlè	Port-au-Prince	
Carrefour	Kafou	Port-au-Prince	40–50% of buildings destroyed in the worst-affected areas of the town
Grand-Goâve	Grangwav	Léogâne	90% destroyed, including all public buildings
Gressier	Gresye	Port-au-Prince	40–50% of buildings destroyed, including the police station
Léogâne	Leyogàn	Léogâne	epicentre; 80–90% of buildings damaged or destroyed
Pétion-Ville		Port-au-Prince	
Petit-Goâve	Tigwav	Léogâne	
Port-au-Prince	Pòtoprens	Port-au-Prince	
Titanyen		Arcahaie	burial site of tens of thousands of earthquake victims in multiple mass graves

=== Sud-Est department ===
Populated place	Haitian Creole	Arrondissement	Notes
Jacmel	Jakmèl	Jacmel	70% of homes damaged; airport and city hall damaged; hospital "half-destroyed"
Les Palmes			
Morne-à-Chandelle			

== Structures ==
Structure	City/town	Type	Notes
Cathedral of Our Lady of the Assumption	Port-au-Prince	cathedral	
Christopher Hotel	Port-au-Prince	hotel	
Ciné Institute	Jacmel	school	Haiti's only film school, "lost two buildings"
Holy Trinity Cathedral	Port-au-Prince	cathedral	"devastated"
Hôtel Montana	Port-au-Prince	hotel	
Jacmel Airport	Jacmel	airport	damaged
Killick (Coast Guard base)	Port-au-Prince	government	"several key buildings" destroyed and "mess hall, depot and main administrative buildings" damaged
National Palace	Port-au-Prince	government	destroyed
Palais de Justice	Port-au-Prince	government	
Palais Législatif	Port-au-Prince	government	
Port international de Port-au-Prince	Port-au-Prince	port	north (main) pier destroyed, south pier damaged
Toussaint Louverture International Airport	Port-au-Prince	airport	air traffic control tower "knocked out"

== See also ==
- Casualties of the 2010 Haiti earthquake
