= Goâve =

Goâve may represent:

- Rivière de Grand Goâve
- Goâve is a former town in Haiti, it was divided during the French colonial period into:
  - Grand-Goâve
  - Petit-Goâve
