= List of universities in Haiti =

This is a list of universities in Haiti.

== Universities/Schools ==
This is a list of post-secondary colleges and universities in Haiti.

- Institut des Sciences des Technologies et des Etudes Avancées d'Haiti (ISTEAH)
- American University of the Caribbean (Haiti)
- Université de la Paix (Haïti)
- Theophany University
- Flame University (Haïti)
- Université Agricole de Management des Metiers de la Production (UAMMP)
- Hispagnola Academy of Sciences of Haiti (HASH)
- Centre d'Enseignement Supérieur et de Recherche Scientifique (SUN)
- Université Saint-Michel Archange d'Haiti (UNISMAH)
- Université Lumière (Haïti) (ULUM)
- Centre d'Etudes Diplomatiques et Internationales (CEDI)
- Centre Universitaire Polytechnique d'Haïti (CUPH)
- Université Chrétienne du Nord d'Haïti [Christian University of North Haiti]
- College Universitaire de Christianville
- CREFIMA Université
- École Nationale Supérieure de Technologie (ENST)
- École Supérieure Catholique de Droit de Jérémie (ESCDROJ)
- École Supérieure d'Infotronique d'Haïti (ESIH)
- Faculté des Sciences Infirmières de l'Université Épiscopale d'Haïti à Léogâne (FSIL)
- Hartford University (Haiti) (HU)
- Hautes Études Commerciales et Économique
- Institut de Formation des Cadres (IFC)
- Institut des Hautes Études Commerciales et Économique (IHECE)
- Institut Polytechnique de Léogâne
- Institut Universitaire de Formation des Cadres (INUFOCAD)
- Institut Universitaire de l'Ouest (IUO)
- Institut Universitaire des Sciences de l'Éducation (IUSE/CREFI)
- Institut Universitaire et Technologique d'Haïti (INUTECH)
- Institut Universitaire Quisqueya-Amerique (INUQUA)
- Millennium International University of the Americas
- PAODES Université
- Séminaire de Théologie Évangélique de la Grace (STEG) - Offshoot of Université Queensland
- Université Adventiste d'Haïti (UNAH)
- Université Américaine des Sciences Modernes d'Haïti (UNASMOH)
- Université Autonome Charlemagne Peralte (UNACP)
- Université Autonome de Port-au-Prince (UNAPEDU)
- Université Caraïbe
- Université de David Pierre de PENDUS (UDPD)
- Université de Fondwa
- Université de la Fondation Dr. Aristide (UNIFA)
- Université de la Nouvelle Grand'Anse (UNOGA)
- Université de L'Académie Haïtienne (UAH)
- Université de Port-au-Prince
- Université Saint François d'Assise d'Haïti (USFAH)
- Université de Vital Jeff de la Caraïbe
- Université d'Etat d'Haïti
- Université d'Etudes Internationales (UDEI)
- Université Épiscopale d'Haïti (UNEPH)
- Université Franco-Haïtienne du Cap-Haïtien (UFCH)
- Université GOC.
- Université Innovatrice d'Haïti (UNIH)
- Université Joseph Lafortune (UJLF)
- Université la Pléiade d'Haïti (UPLEH)
- Université Yahvé Nissi (UNYN)
- Université Notre Dame d'Haïti (UNDH)
- Université Polyvalente d'Haïti (UPH)
- Université Queensland (UQ)
- Université Quisqueya (UNIQ)
- Université de la Renaissance d'Haïti (URH)
- Université Roi Henri Christophe (URHC)
- Université Ruben Leconte (URL)
- Université Russell-Kant (UR-K)
- Université Saint Gérard (USG)
- Séminaire de Théologie Évangélique de Port-au-Prince (STEP)
- Université de Technologie d'Haïti (UNITECH)
- Université INUKA
- Université Publique de la Grande-Anse (UPGA)
