= Trouin (disambiguation) =

René Duguay-Trouin (1673–1736), also known as René Trouin, was a French privateer and admiral.

Trouin may also refer to:

- Trouin, Haiti, a Haitian town
- César Trouin (1866–1919), French politician
- Jean Trouin (1673–1712), French alchemist and swindler
