= IUO =

IUO may refer to:

- Igbinedion University, Okada, the first private university in Nigeria
- Università degli Studi di Napoli "L'Orientale", a university in Italy
- Institut Universitaire de l'Ouest, from the list of universities in Haiti
- Industrial Unit Output, the currency unit of the game, Stellar Conquest
