= Morne-à-Chandelle =

- Village
- Location in Haiti
- Coordinates: 18°50′1″N 72°51′9″W
- Country: Haiti
- Department: Ouest
- Arrondissement: La Gonâve
- Time zone: UTC-5 (UTC)

Morne-à-Chandelle (French pronunciation: [mɔʁn a ʃɑ̃dɛl]) is a village in the La Gonâve Arrondissement, in the Ouest department of Haiti, on the southern side of the Gulf of Gonâve. It is located 7.7 miles (12.4 km) east of Léogâne.

== History ==
The village was nearly over the epicenter of the 2010 Haiti earthquake and consequently experienced much damage.

The only building that remained standing after the 2010 earthquake was the kindergarten. At least 54 people were killed, including 50 children.

== Education ==
The village has parochial elementary schools, including St. Michael the Archangel. There are about 1,300 children in school. These are privately funded community schools operating with the approval of the Ministry of Education. They are under the guidance of the Roman Catholic Archdiocese of Port-au-Prince.
