= Port-au-Prince Bay =

Bay in Haiti

- Baie de Port-au-Prince (French)
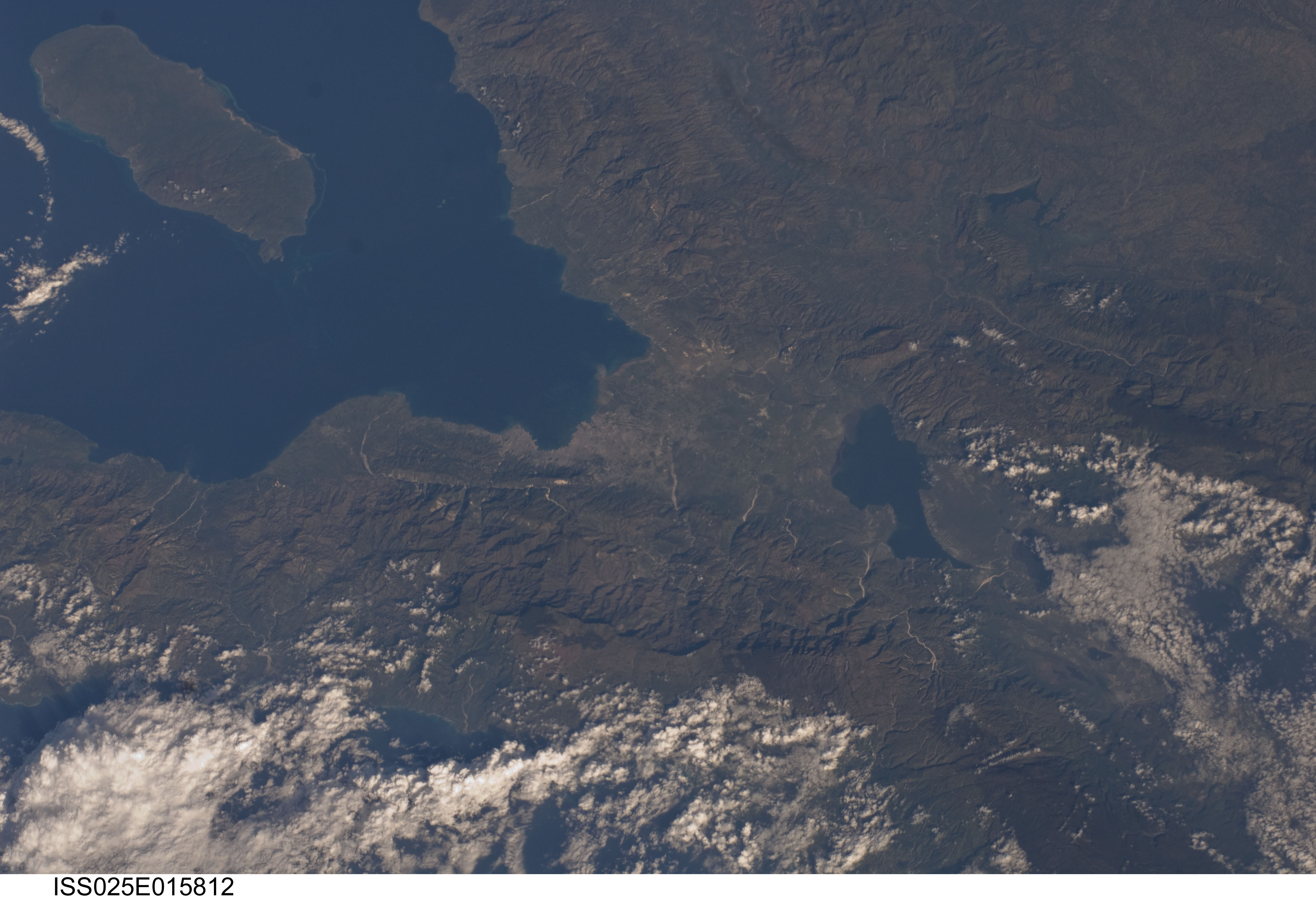
- Satellite image of Port-au-Prince Bay

- Location within Haiti
- Location: Gulf of Gonâve
- Coordinates: 18°37′03″N 72°27′03″W
- River sources: Grise River; Bâtarde River; Froide River; Momance River
- Basin countries: Haiti
- Settlements: Port-au-Prince

Port-au-Prince Bay is a bay located in the Gulf of Gonâve in Haiti, at the bottom of which lies the vast plain of the Cul-de-Sac and the country's capital, Port-au-Prince, alongside its metropolitan area. It is connected to the gulf via two inlets located on either side of the island of Gonâve: the Canal de Saint-Marc to the north of it and the Canal de la Gonâve to the south.

== Geography ==
Port-au-Prince Bay extends from the Pointe de Trou Forban in the northwest to the Pointe de Cà-lra in the southwest and is about 40 km (25 mi) wide and about 50 km (31 mi) long.

The Grise, Bâtarde, Froide, and Momance Rivers as well as the Boucanbrou Canal flow into Port-au-Prince Bay.

== History ==
On 13 January 2010, in the aftermath of the 2010 Haiti earthquake, the U.S. Coast Guard cutter Forward arrived and began running air-traffic control from Port-au-Prince Bay.
