= Meteorological history of Hurricane Gustav =

Hurricane Gustav
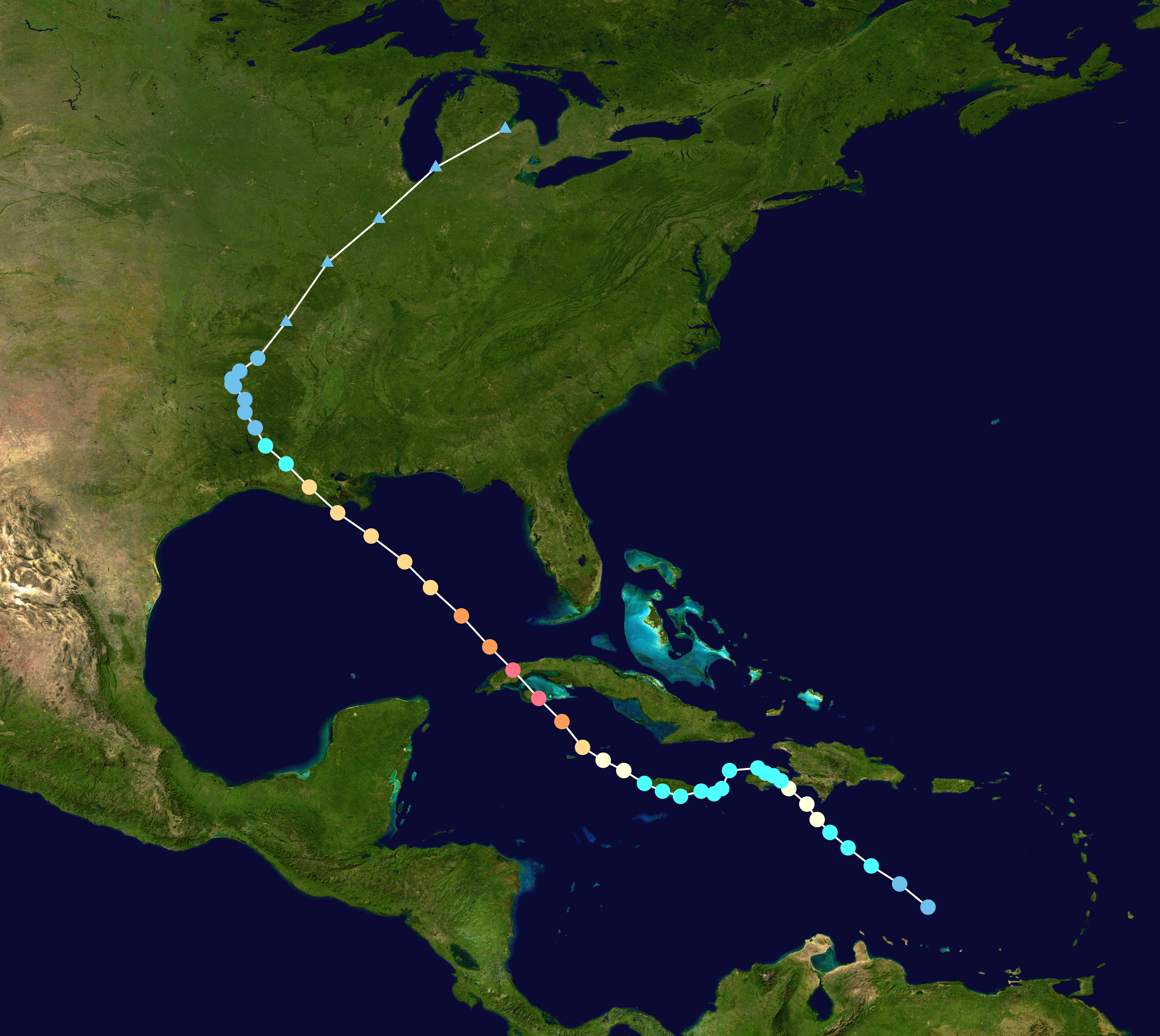
- Track of Hurricane Gustav

Meteorological history
- Formed: August 25, 2008
- Extratropical: September 4
- Dissipated: September 7, 2008

Category 4 major hurricane
- 1-minute sustained (SSHWS/NWS)
- Highest winds: 155 mph (250 km/h)
- Lowest pressure: 941 mbar (hPa); 27.79 inHg

Overall effects
- Areas affected: Haiti, Dominican Republic, Jamaica, Cayman Islands, Cuba, United States
- Part of the 2008 Atlantic hurricane season

The meteorological history of Hurricane Gustav spanned eleven days, from August 25 to September 4, 2008. The tropical disturbance which eventually spawned Hurricane Gustav gathered on August 16, southwest of the Cape Verde islands, but was slow to develop as it trekked west across the Atlantic. Upon reaching the warm waters of Caribbean Sea it began to organize and became a tropical depression on August 25. It quickly strengthened to a tropical storm, and then a hurricane, before making landfall on Haiti's southwest peninsula. Gustav was severely disrupted by Hispaniola's mountains and stalled, disorganized, in the Gulf of Gonâve between August 26 and 27.

Deep convection reformed the storm's center southwest of Haiti, near Jamaica's east coast. Under the influence of a mid-level ridge that extended from the Gulf of Mexico to the western Atlantic Ocean, Gustav picked up a westward motion. It was briefly disrupted by Jamaica as it passed over the mountainous island but rapidly strengthened when it moved over open water once again. Reaching Category 4 strength about 24 hours after having been upgraded to a hurricane, Gustav brushed the Isle of Youth and made landfall on Cuba's western's peninsula.

Disrupted by mountains once again, Gustav never regained its former strength. Briefly traveling over a warm eddy of the Gulf Stream's loop current it encountered moderate wind shear and cooling sea surface temperatures. Fluctuations in its internal structure and visible appearance did not counter the storm's general weakening trend, and Hurricane Gustav made its final landfall as a Category 2 hurricane near Cocodrie, Louisiana on September 1. Moving inland, the storm quickly weakened but persisted as a significant tropical depression until it was adsorbed by a frontal boundary on September 5.

== Formation ==
Gustav shortly after being named on August 25

On August 18, 2008, a tropical wave which had left the coast of Africa five days previously, developed into a significant low pressure area about 600 miles (970 km) west-southwest of the Cape Verde islands. This wave moved westward across the Atlantic in conditions that were not favorable for development. As it began to approach the Windward Islands conditions improved and it showed some signs of organization, but no circulation. Upon reaching the windward islands on August 23, bringing showers, thunderstorms, and generally squally weather, wind shear over the system decreased and atmospheric conditions improved. Over the eastern Caribbean Sea, about 250 miles (400 km) south of Santo Domingo, a low level circulation began to form. Hours later well-defined curved bands and an improving circulation at the surface warranted that the system be designated a tropical depression.

The depression formed a small inner wind core 12 mi (19 km) in diameter which allowed it to rapidly organize, and on the afternoon of August 25 it was upgraded to a tropical storm and first given the name Gustav. A renewed period of disorganization proved to be very short lived, and that night a well-defined eye formed. This eye was accompanied by strengthening as the storm continued to move northwest towards Haiti. Before reaching the island, Gustav's strengthening pattern raised it to hurricane strength. Its prominent and organizing central dense overcast belied persistent strengthening which continued until Hurricane Gustav made landfall on Haiti's southwest peninsula about 10 mi (16 km) west of Jacmel, at around 1800 UTC on August 26, with winds of 80 mph (130 km/h) and a minimum central pressure of 992 mbar (29.29 inHg).

== Interaction with Haiti and Jamaica ==
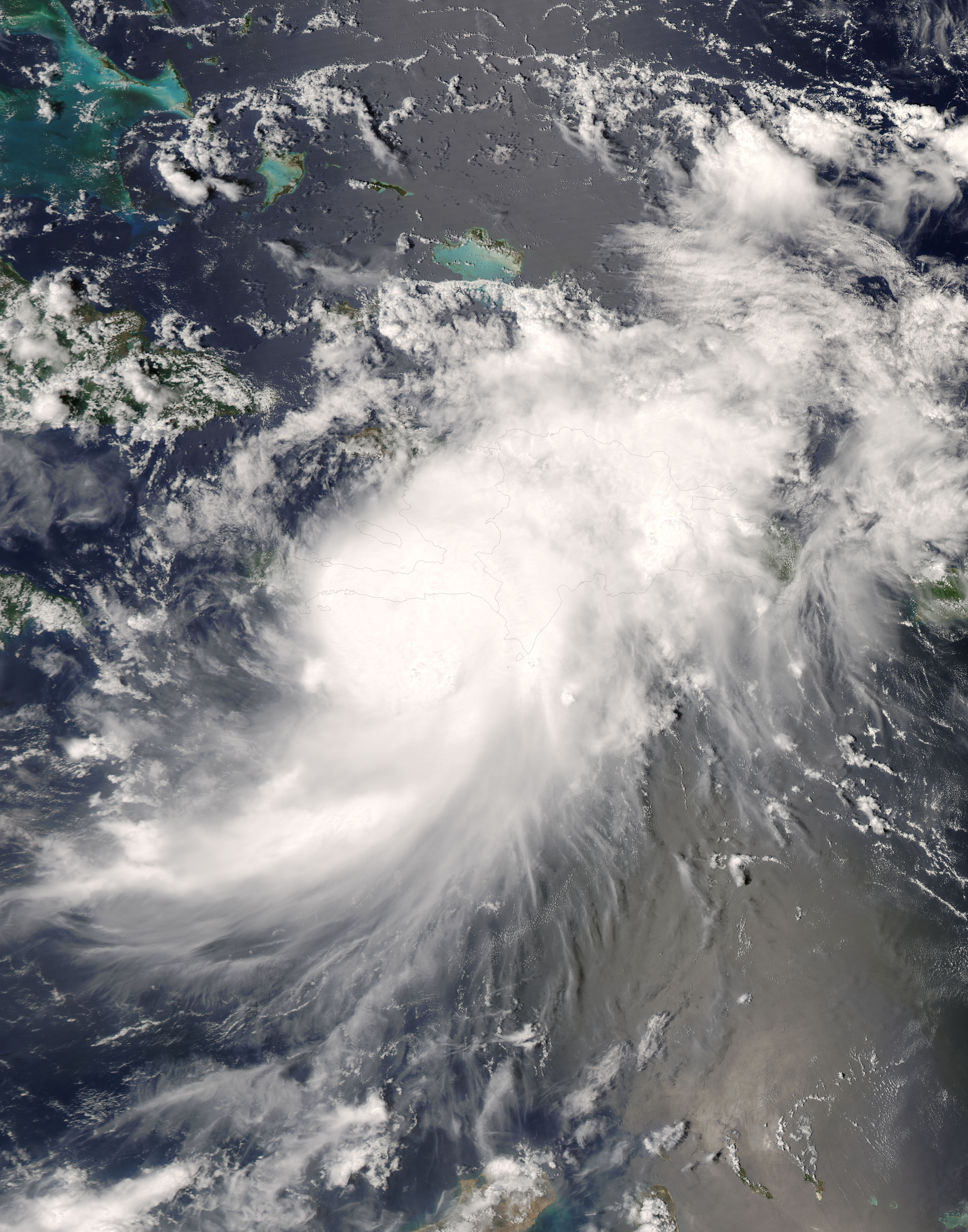
Hurricane Gustav making landfall in Haiti on August 26

After making landfall near Jacmel, Hurricane Gustav began traversing northwestward across the mountainous terrain of southwestern Haiti, dumping heavy rains as it passed. With favorable atmospheric conditions the storm maintained its hurricane intensity for several hours after landfall, but the high mountains over which it was traveling disrupted its lower-level circulation. The eye because ragged and clouded over as Gustav weakened to a tropical storm. A large mid- to upper-level anticyclone over the Florida Straits slowed Gustav's movement, holding it over the northern coast of Haiti's southern peninsula. Rainfall from the storm, which had been heavy since its landfall, began to accumulate as the storm's movement stalled. Although the storm's upper levels began experiencing moderate shear, and although parts of its circulation were still interacting with the mountains of southwestern Haiti, enough of Gustav's convection was over the Gulf of Gonâve that on the morning of August 27 its organization started to improve. That afternoon, as a broad ridge extended from the Gulf of Mexico into the western Atlantic Ocean, Gustav began to slowly pull to the west, away from the island of Hispaniola. Increased shear weakened the storm as the building ridge to the north of Gustav imparted a southerly component to the storm's motion.

Northeasterly shear inhibited convection in the northeast quadrant, breaking up the storm's existing center. The storm's center reformed to the south, east of Jamaica, around a flare of deep convection. This new center was a little stronger than its previous one, and Gustav began moving southwest toward Jamaica. With its southerly reformation Gustav had moved itself away from the mountains of Haiti and over the warm waters of the Caribbean Sea. Finding itself in a much more advantageous environment, Gustav restrengthened to 70 mph (110 km/h). Continuing west under influence of the same mid-level ridge that had dominated its steering thus far, Gustav approached Jamaica and its outer bands delivered heavy rains. Unwavering in its westward motion, Gustav made landfall on Jamaica's eastern tip on August 28 at 1800 UTC at just below hurricane strength. It then moved across Jamaica, with its center on the southern coast, and its convection dragging across the island's mountainous center. Fifteen hours after making landfall, Gustav's center moved off the island's west coast and back over the Caribbean Sea. Unlike its Haitian landfall, Gustav's interaction with Jamaica did not disturb its structure. As it left the island on the morning of August 29, the storm's diameter increased substantially and prominent banding features developed. Its low-level center reorganized over the open water and with little wind shear a strengthening pattern emerged which quickly returned Gustav to hurricane status that afternoon.

== Western Caribbean Sea ==
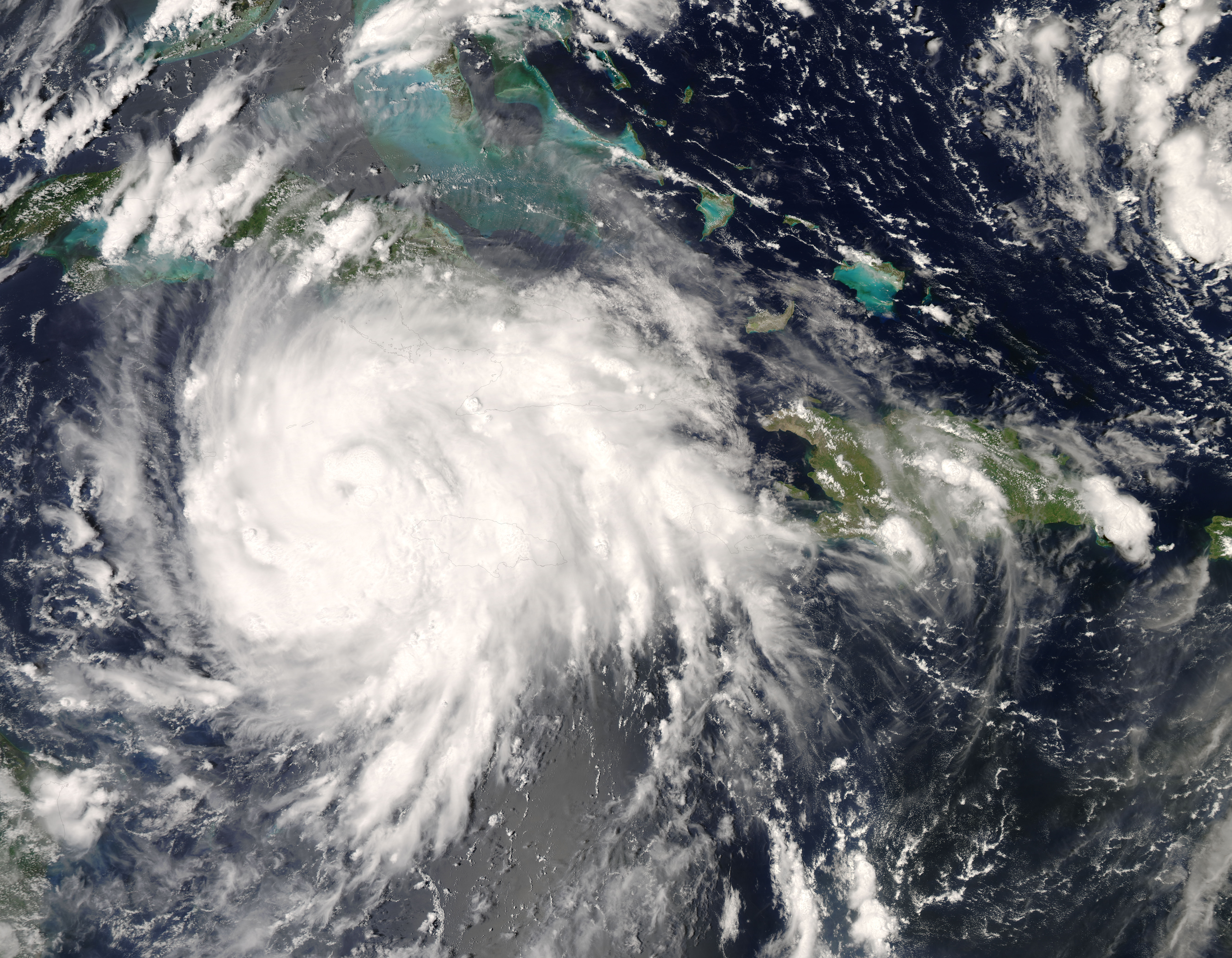
Gustav regaining hurricane strength on August 29, after crossing the island of Jamaica

Having cleared the disruptive landmass of Jamaica, Hurricane Gustav entered a period of sustained intensification. Within hours of leaving the island the storm regained hurricane status and the first signs of an eye appeared. Convective bands and upper-level outflow became well defined in all quadrants, wind shear decreased, and deep warm waters of the Caribbean Sean provided the perfect conditions for strengthening. The subtropical ridge over the eastern Gulf of Mexico developed a weakness, and as Gustav approached the Cayman Islands it was into this weakness that Gustav was drawn. As Hurricane Gustav tore through the low-lying Cayman Islands its 30 mi (48 km) wide eye became very well pronounced. In the early morning hours of August 30, and Gustav continued to pass through the Cayman Islands, the storm's winds increased to 100 mph (160 km/h), raising Hurricane Gustav to Category 2 strength.

Hurricane Gustav near peak intensity on August 30, shortly before landfall on western Cuba

Through the morning Hurricane Gustav continued to rapidly strengthen. Deep convection around the eye flared intensely and the hurricane's minimum central pressure dropped precipitously—24 mbar (0.71 inHg) in 24 hours. By 1000 UTC it had reached Category 3 strength and continued to strengthen. Another drop in pressure–down 11 mbar (0.32 inHg) in 6 hours to 954 mbar (28.2 inHg)–was quickly followed by an increase in wind speed to 145 mph (233 km/h), making Hurricane Gustav a Category 4 hurricane when it had been a mere tropical storm only 24 hours earlier. That afternoon, as Hurricane Gustav continued moving northwest towards Cuba, its western eyewall passed directly over the Isle of Youth.

Passing along the eastern coast of the Isle of Youth, Gustav wobbled slightly, possibly the result of an eyewall replacement cycle, and strengthened even further. Here, even as it brushed the island, Hurricane Gustav continued to strengthen, making a brief landfall with a central pressure of 943 mbar (27.8 inHg) and winds of 145 mph (233 km/h). Its long-term motion continued to be dominated by a mid-level ridge over the western Atlantic, and that evening, with a central pressure of 941 mbar (27.8 inHg), the hurricane made landfall in western mainland Cuba near los Palacios at just under Category 5 intensity, bringing its 155 mph (249 km/h) winds onshore. At a height of 10 metres (33 ft), a 211 mph (340 km/h) gust was recorded, which the World Meteorological Organization confirmed to be strongest ever measured during a hurricane.

== Gulf of Mexico ==
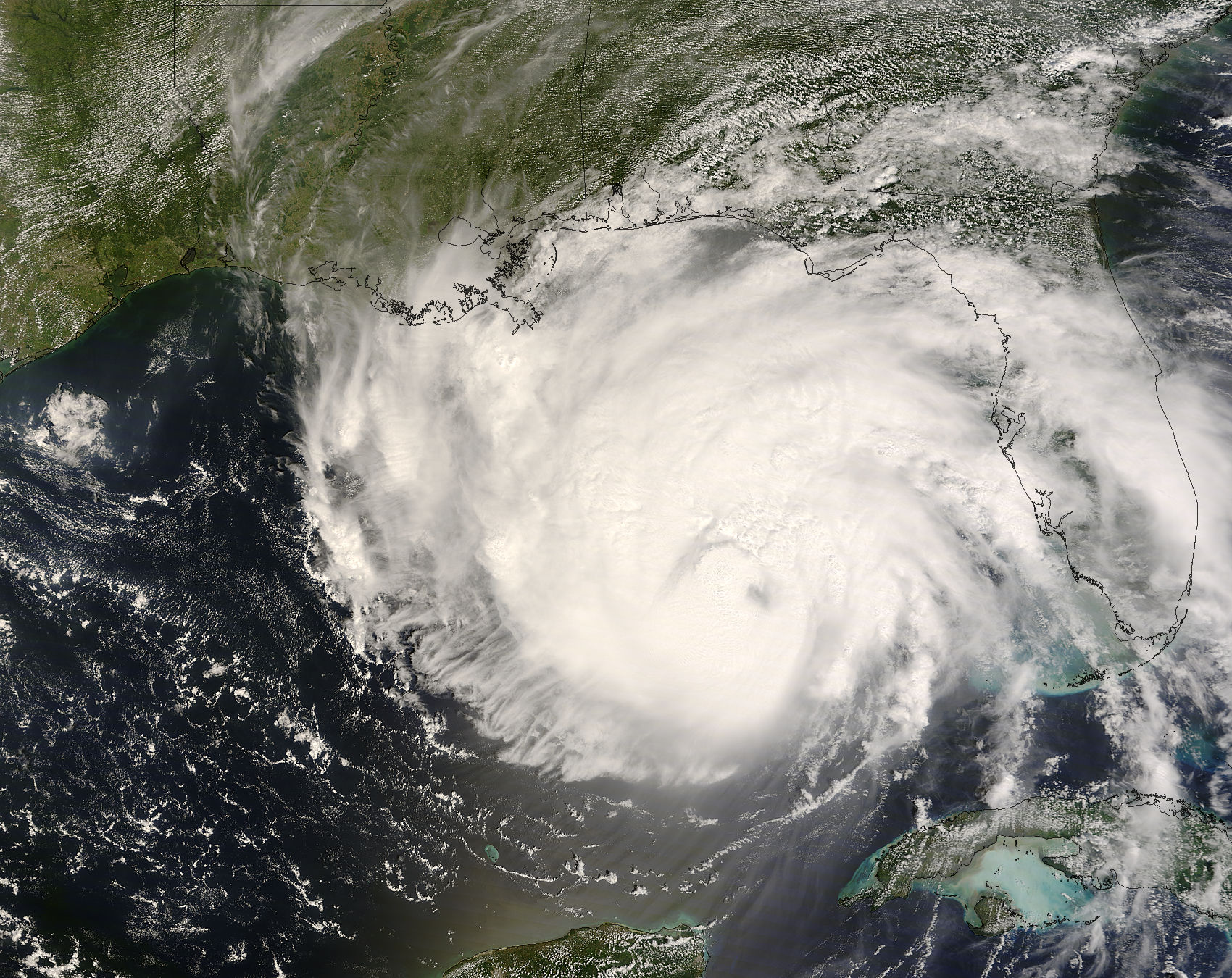
Hurricane Gustav approaching Louisiana on August 31, displaying a partial eye and generally ragged structure after crossing Cuba

The low mountains of western Cuba disrupted Hurricane Gustav's low-level circulation. Although it crosses the island in only a few hours, the brief interaction caused the storm's eye to partially cloud-over and its wind speeds fell to 140 mph (230 km/h) as it entered that southeastern Gulf of Mexico that night. Through that night and into the morning of August 31 it continued moving northwestward across the Gulf, its winds weakening to 125 mph (201 km/h) as the damage from its interaction with Cuba continued to take its toll. That morning the eye, which was expanding as the storm weakened, completely clouded over. Some mid- to upper-level dry air was drawn into the cyclone and a trough to the south added a slight vertical shear, but these interferences were short lived. Under the continued influence of the ridge over the western Atlantic and southeastern United States Hurricane Gustav accelerated into the central gulf. Here the storm tracked over a warm eddy in the loop current, but the high oceanic heat content failed to induce strengthening. Deep convection continued to be asymmetric and the eyewall opened to the southeast as wind speed continued to fall into Category 2 status. However, by the afternoon of August 31 the hurricane's ragged appearance began to improve. The eye returned properly and its minimum central pressure fell even as its outer bands came ashore on the northern Gulf Coast. Its asymmetric appearance improved and its wind radius expanded, but by that night Gustav had moved off the eddy of the loop current and over slightly cooler water. It could not restrengthen here, despite its more impressive presentation.

In the pre-dawn hours of September 1, while 170 mi (270 km) from the Gulf Coast, the hurricane's wind field expanded and tropical storm force winds extended 220 mi (350 km) from its center. Dry air intrusion from the south broke up the hurricane's eye, completely dissolving the eyewall as heavy rain bands came ashore in the state of Louisiana. As the eye approached the Louisiana coast, the storm weakened to 105 mph. Making landfall near Cocodrie, Louisiana at 1430 UTC the eye briefly reformed but was not associated with any strengthening.

== Dissipation ==
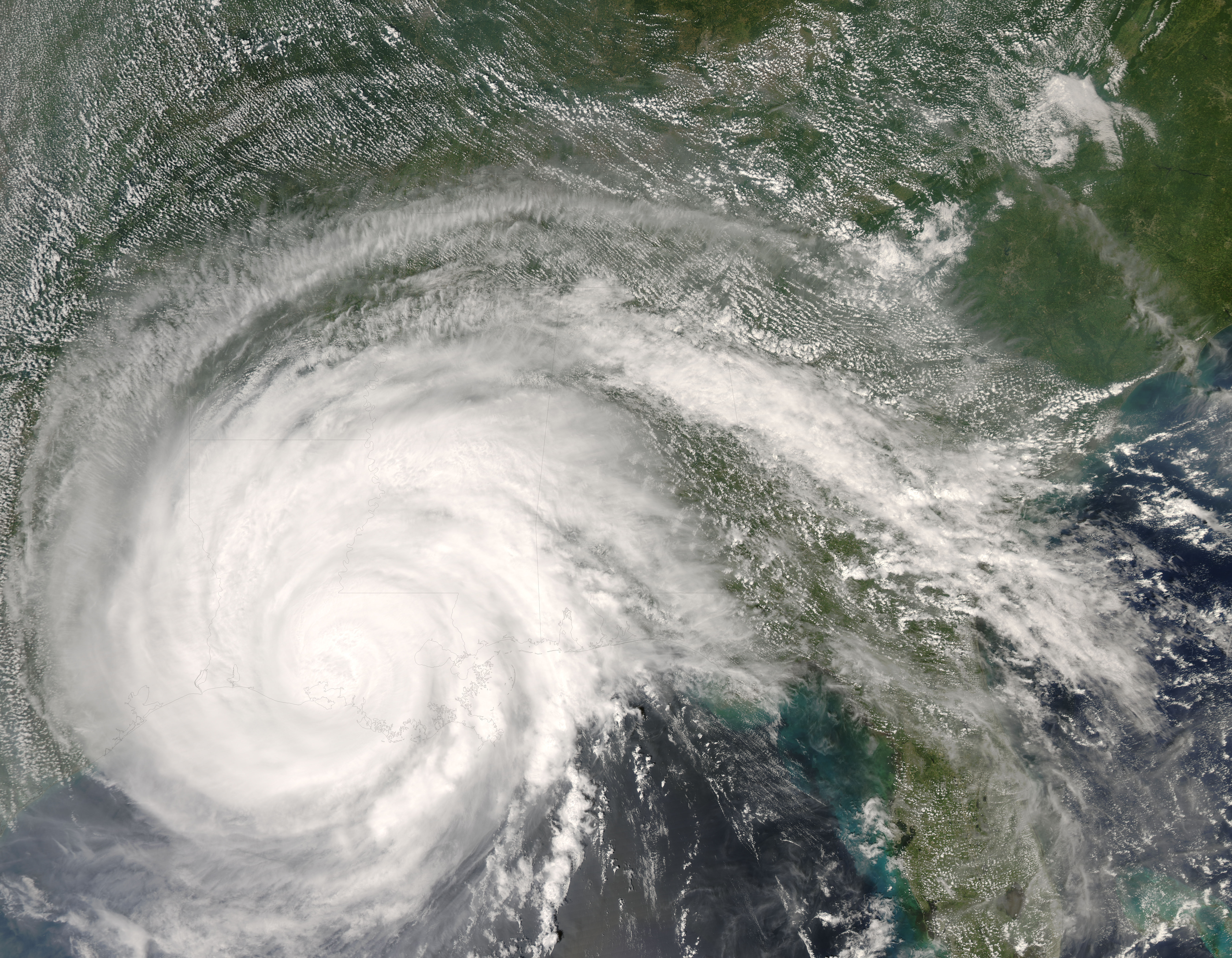
Hurricane Gustav on September 1, about 4 hours after landfall. The eye has already been cloud-filled.

After landfall the hurricane continued moving northwestward at 15 mph (24 km/h). The mid-level ridge over the southeastern United States which had dominated Gustav's steering for the last few days drifted northward, pulling the hurricane with it. Moving further inland Hurricane Gustav continued to weaken while delivering torrential rains to the central gulf coast of the United States. The eye that had cleared during landfall filled in that afternoon and was replaced by a central dense overcast. That night, 12 hours after landfall, Gustav weakened to a tropical storm with winds of 60 mph (97 km/h).

Radar image of the remnants of Gustav reaching southern Wisconsin on September 5

Slipping below tropical storm strength the following morning, Gustav's previously firm steering currents began to erode and its forward motion slowed. As the storm crept through northwest Louisiana on September 2, its heavy rainfall began to accumulate in the region. As the storm continued northwestward though the intersection of Arkansas, Louisiana, Texas, and Oklahoma and into Arkansas proper, its forward motion slowed considerably and it dumped isolated rainfall accumulations in excess of 9 inches (228.60 mm). Through the morning of September 3, Tropical Depression Gustav briefly drifted north-northeastward under very weak steering currents, but stalled completely over southwestern Arkansas that afternoon and spread heavy rain into the mid-Mississippi Valley. By the evening, steering currents returned and Gustav picked up speed to the northeast at 7 mph (11 km/h). Moving even more rapidly Gustav left the Mississippi Valley and headed towards the Ohio Valley.

The next morning, as it passed through Missouri, Gustav began to gain extratropical characteristics as it merged with a frontal boundary. The extratropical transition was completed on the afternoon of September 4 as Gustav's remnant low was moving 28 mph (45 km/h) over St. Louis, Missouri. Although no longer a tropical system, the remnants of Gustav continued to bring wind and rain to the northern United States. That evening, still traveling northeastward, the remnants dropped 2–4 in (51–102 mm) of rain on Illinois and its widespread remnant low produced trace rainfall stretching from Iowa to Indiana. By nightfall on September 4 the remnants had reached southwest Michigan, where they dumped rain until the next morning, with accumulations as high as 5 in (130 mm). The storm's circulation remained intact through Wisconsin where it dropped almost 1 in (25 mm) of rainfall. Some of Gustav's more northerly remnants even drifted into Minnesota where they dropped small amounts of rain. On September 5, the storm's extratropical remnants were absorbed by a larger extratropical low moving through the Great Lakes.

== See also ==
- Hurricane Gustav
- List of Atlantic hurricanes
- 2008 Atlantic hurricane season
