= Durissy =

- Village
- Location in Haiti
- Coordinates: 18°23′0″N 72°50′0″W
- Country: Haiti
- Department: Ouest
- Arrondissements of Haiti: Léogâne
- Time zone: UTC-5 (UTC)

Durissy is a village in the Léogâne Arrondissement, in the Ouest department of Haiti. It is west-southwest of Port-au-Prince.

== History ==
The village suffered damage during the 2010 Haiti earthquake. The school, just built in 2002, was destroyed. Plans are underway to restore it.

== Education ==
The village has a parochial elementary school, Our Lady of Perpetual Help. (Note: Literally: "Ecole Notre-Dame de Perpetuel Secours")

=== School ===
The school was founded by Father Anis Yves on October 5, 2002. Digicel contributed the school and furnishings. It also supported teachers salaries in 2008. It is a privately funded community school operating with the approval of the Ministry of Education. It is under the guidance of the Roman Catholic Archdiocese of Port-au-Prince.

It teaches grades K-7. Food is contributed during the school year.

There are 273 students, 105 boys and 93 girls. There are nine teachers.

The following subjects are taught: Math, French, Creole, Social and Experimental Science, and Religion.

There is a board of appointed directors.

== Infrastructure ==
The village has no electricity and no potable water. It receives its mail through Petit-Goâve.
