= Les Palmes =

- Rural settlement
- Location in Haiti
- Coordinates: 18°20′0″N 72°51′0″W
- Country: Haiti
- Department: Ouest
- Arrondissement: Léogâne

Population (7 August 2003)
  - Total: 30,000

Les Palmes is a rural settlement in the Léogâne Arrondissement, in the Ouest department of Haiti. There are more than 30,000 people living in the area.

== History ==
The name of the town means "the palms" in English.

During the 2010 Haiti earthquake, over 50 deaths were reported. The church, built about 1949, collapsed. Few homes were left in an inhabitable state.

== Geography ==
The town is in a mountainous area, on several mountain tops and within their enclosed valleys.

== Education ==
The village has seven parochial schools run by Notre Dame parish, an elementary and a secondary school. They are privately funded community schools operating with the approval of the Ministry of Education. They are under the guidance of the Roman Catholic Archdiocese of Port-au-Prince.

There are about 6,300 children living in the community.
