= Task Force Danbi =

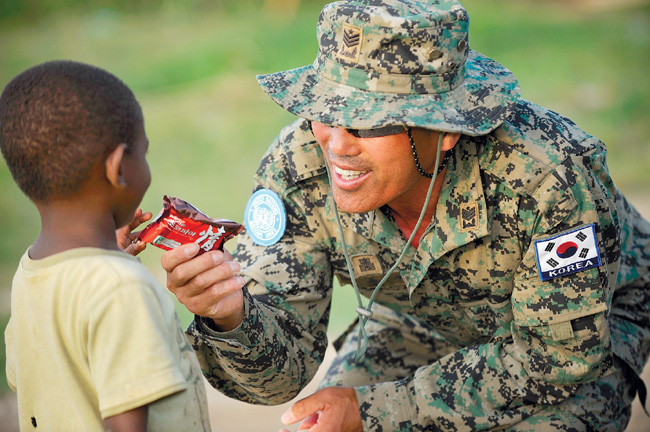
A soldier from the Task Force Danbi.

Task Force Danbi(Korean: 단비부대) is the South Korean military mission to Haiti for earthquake relief in the aftermath of the 12 January 2010 earthquake.

This became South Korea's sixth UN Peacekeeping Mission. The mission is expected to last until 31 December 2010.

== Name ==
The name "Danbi" (단비) was chosen after a competition of 8 days. Danbi means "long awaited rain", or "sweet rain after a long drought". It won over the other two suggested names, "희망", "서애".

== Mission timeline ==
On 13 January 2010, a 25-member military rescue team was sent as part of a 41-member Korean rescue squad to Haiti.

On 18 January 2010, the South Korean government announced a peacekeeping mission (PKO) to help Haiti.

On 5 February 2010, the UN announced that the South Korean military engineering teams would be deployed to Léogâne.

On 9 February 2010, South Korea's National Assembly gave unanimous assent to the military mission to Haiti.

On 10 February 2010, the first group of 30 troops left for Haiti.

As of 18 February 2010, the force has started constructing a hospital.

On 23 February 2010, the announced that it would provide the Korean military task force with 400 portable toilets.

On 27 February 2010, 190 PKO personnel were sent to Haiti.

On 28 February 2010, the entire force had arrived in Léogâne.

As of 8 March 2010, the name 단비 (Danbi) had been chosen for the mission.

== Reactions ==
Koreans have criticized their own government over the slow response, and small and poorly equipped initial response to the earthquake.
