= Faculté des Sciences Infirmières de l'Université Épiscopale d'Haïti à Léogâne =

Location
- Léogâne; Haiti
- Coordinates: 18.515°N 72.632°W

Information
- Founded: January 1st, 2005; 21 years ago
- Status: open
- Dean: Hilda Alcindor
- Website: FSIL

La Faculté des Sciences Infirmières de l'Université Épiscopale d'Haïti à Léogâne or FSIL (English- Faculty of Nursing Science of the Episcopal University of Haiti in Léogâne) is a baccalaureate nursing school located in Léogâne, Haiti. It is the only four-year nursing school in Haiti and is part of the Université Épiscopale d'Haïti (UNEPH). The college receives financial support from the nonprofit 501(c)(3) Haiti Nursing Foundation.

The first class was admitted in January 2005, and the dean is Hilda Alcindor, BA, RN.
