= César Trouin =

French politician

Member of the Chamber of Deputies
- In office 1902–1919

Personal details
- Born: November 15, 1866 Oran, French Algeria
- Died: July 31, 1919 (aged 52)
- Party: Radical
- Occupation: Politician

César Trouin (15 November 1866 - 31 July 1919) was a French politician.

Trouin was born in Oran, French Algeria. He represented the Radical Party from 1902 to 1919 in the Chamber of Deputies.
