= Institut Universitaire des Sciences de l'Éducation =

The Institut Universitaire des Sciences de l'Éducation is a Haitian higher education institution, independent and non-political, commonly known by the acronym CREFI. Its fundamental objective is to influence the quality of education through the training of trainers and multipurpose senior executives.
