= Trouin, Haiti =

Town in Léogâne, Haiti

Trouin
- Town
- Location in Haiti
- Coordinates: 18°19′0″N 72°47′0″W
- Country: Haiti
- Department: Ouest
- Arrondissement: Léogâne

Trouin is a town in the Léogâne Arrondissement, in the Ouest department of Haiti. It is located 37 kilometers (23 mi) southwest of Haiti's capital city, Port-au-Prince.

== Geography ==
Trouin is 18 miles (or 29 km) east of Jacmel.

== Demographics ==
Trouin has approximately 14,500 residents.

== Landmarks ==
Trouin has a health center that was inaugurated on July 9, 2011. It also has a sub-police station that the Economic and Social Assistance Fund (FAES) inaugurated in July 2015.
