= Léogâne =

Léogâne Leyogàn (Haitian Creole) Yaguana (Taino)
- Commune
- Ville de Léogâne
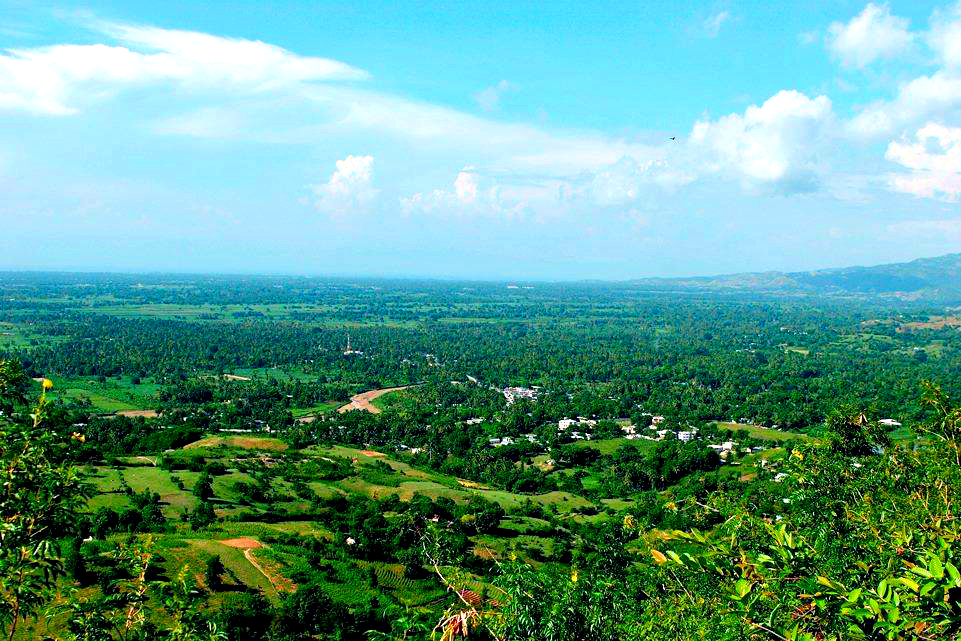
- Nickname: La cité d'Anacaona (The city of Anacaona)
- Motto(s): Je suis Léogânais et je suis fier de l'être (I am Léogânais and I am proud of it)
- Location in Haiti
- Coordinates: 18°30′39″N 72°38′2″W
- Country: Haiti
- Department: Ouest
- Arrondissement: Léogâne
- Communal sections: 1st. Dessources; 2nd. Petite-Rivière; 3rd. Grande-Rivière; 4th. Fond de Boudin; 5th. Palmiste à Vin; 6th. Orangers; 7th. Aux-Parques; 8th. Beauséjour; 9th. Citronniers; 10th. Fond d'Oie; 11th. Gros Morne; 12th. Cormiers; 13th. Petit-Harpon
- Demonym: Léogânais(e)
- Settled: 1663

Government
  - Type: Municipal Government
  - Mayor: Ernson Henry

Area
  - Total: 385 km^{2} (149 sq mi)

Population
  - Total: 90,000
- Time zone: UTC-05:00 (EST)
  - Summer (DST): UTC-04:00 (EDT)
- Zip Code: HT 6210
- Area code: +509
- Website: http://leyogan.com
- Internet Top Level Domains (TLD) .ht .gouv.ht .edu.ht

Léogâne (French pronunciation: [leɔɡan]; Haitian Creole: Leyogàn) is one of the coastal communes in Haiti. It is located in the eponymous Léogâne Arrondissement, which is part of the Ouest Department. The port town is located about 30 km (19 mi) west of the Haitian capital, Port-au-Prince. Léogâne is known for archaeological and historical sites such as Fort Campan.

The town was at the epicenter of the 12 January 2010 earthquake. Like Port-au-Prince, it was catastrophically affected, with 80–90% of buildings damaged. As Haiti is very poor, they couldn't afford earthquake-proof buildings.

== History ==
At the time of the arrival of the Europeans in 1492, Yaguana—modern-day Léogâne—was the capital of Jaragua, one of the five chiefdoms on the island of Hispaniola. This province was the last independent holdout during the Spanish conquest of Hispaniola until the Taíno queen Anacaona, who was born in the town, was captured and killed by the Spaniards in 1503. In 1592 the town was captured and burned by an English privateer fleet led by Christopher Newport.

As the western part of the island was gradually settled by French buccaneers and filibusters, in 1691 the French court appointed Jean-Baptiste du Casse to succeed Pierre-Paul Tarin de Cussy as governor of Saint-Domingue after he was killed in the Battle of Sabana Real. It was during this time that du Casse had renamed the area Léogâne, with traces of the Taino name Yaguana, as were other names of places that were maintained by the Spanish and transmitted over to the French administration. The French secured legal access to one-third of the island from the Spanish crown by the Treaty of Ryswick in 1697 and established a city. The town was destroyed in an earthquake in 1770. In 1791 and 1792, Romaine-la-Prophétesse, who owned a plantation outside Léogâne (in what is now the Fondwa area) and had been influential in the local community, led rebels in taking control of the town and destroying many nearby plantations and freeing their slaves. In 1803, later in the Haitian Revolution, Jean-Jacques Dessalines ordered his men to burn the town to the ground to force out the last of the French colonists. Léogâne was also the birthplace of Marie-Claire Heureuse Félicité, an Empress of Haiti and wife of Haitian revolutionary Jean-Jacques Dessalines.

Charlemagne Péralte, the leader of the Haitian resistance to the U.S. occupation that began in 1915, had been a military officer stationed in Léogâne. He resigned from the military, refusing to surrender to the U.S. troops without a fight. Afterwards, he returned to his native town of Hinche and began leading the Cacos against the occupation forces.

=== 2010 earthquake ===
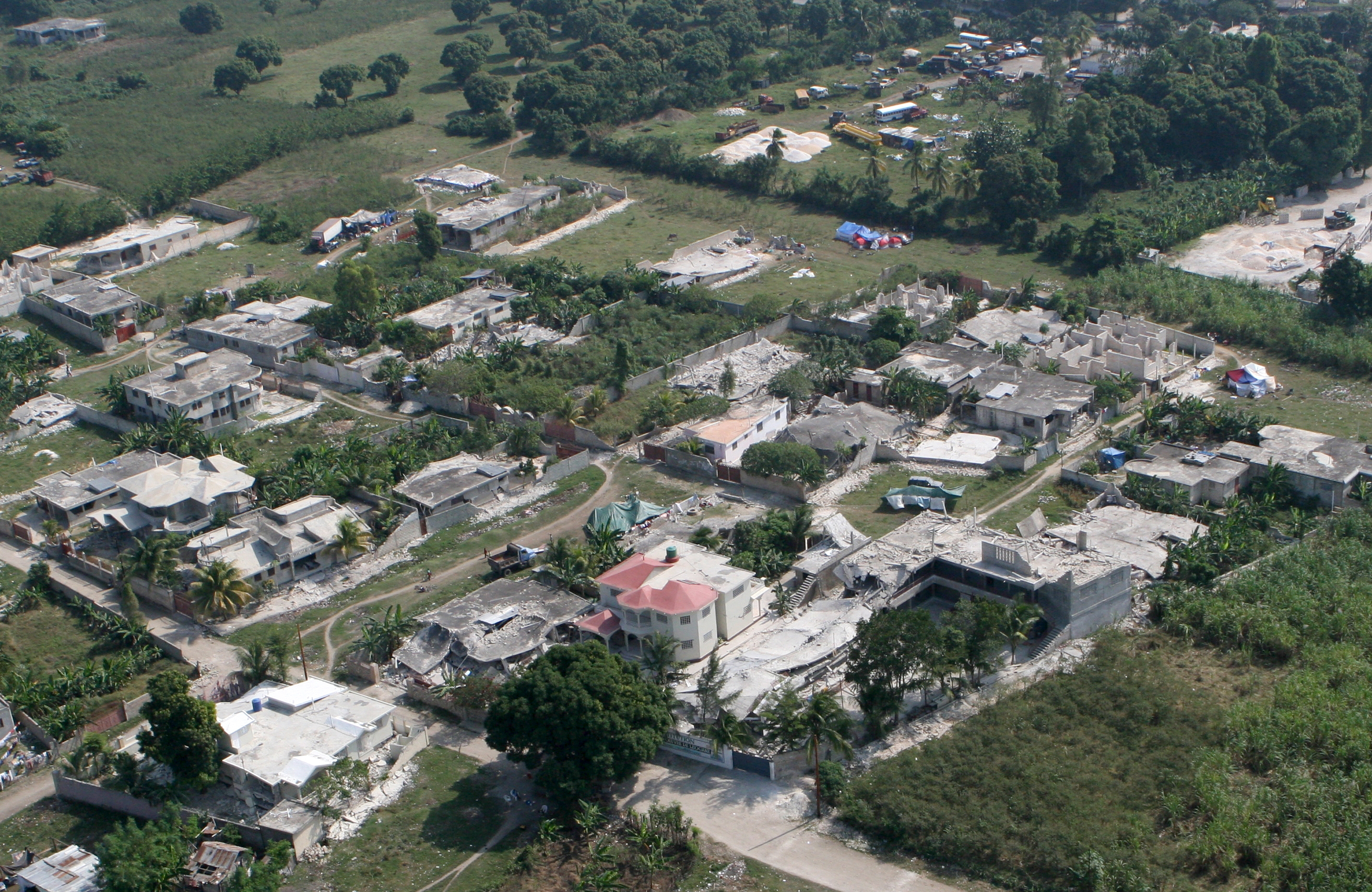
Damage to Léogâne on 22 January

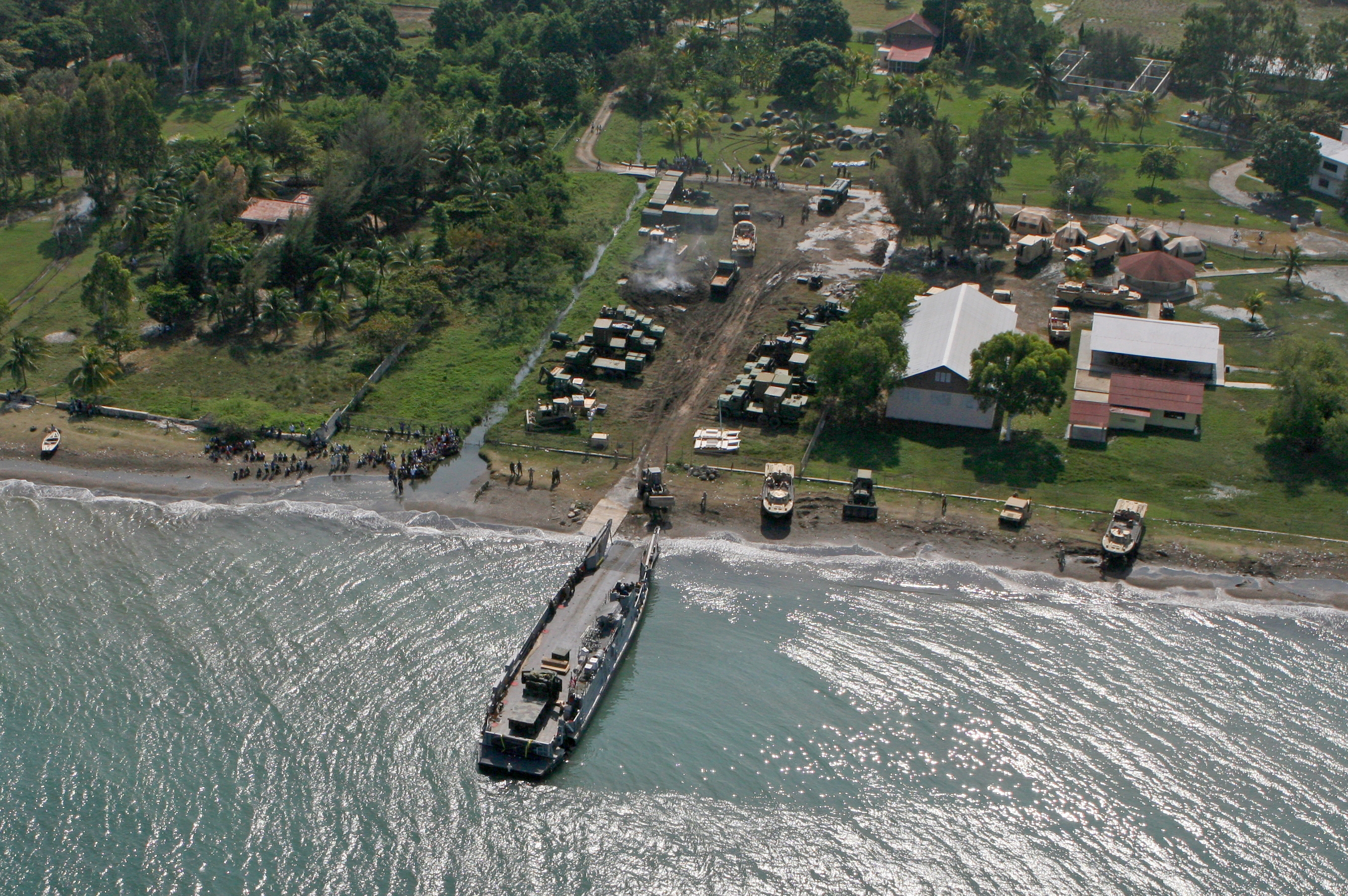
A LCU from the 22nd MEU delivers humanitarian aid and supplies to the beach at Léogâne.

Léogâne was at the epicenter of the 7.0 magnitude 12 January 2010 earthquake and a United Nations assessment team that investigated three main towns near Port-au-Prince found that Léogâne was "the worst affected area" with 80 to 90% of buildings damaged and no remaining government infrastructure. Nearly every concrete structure was destroyed. The damage was also reported to be worse than in the capital. The military estimated that 20,000 to 30,000 people had died from the earthquake in Léogâne. People congregated in ad hoc squatter camps and relief took longer to reach Léogâne than the capital.

As the municipal buildings were destroyed, city hall was moved to a telecommunications building. Among the facilities destroyed in the quake was the Sainte Rose de Lima School, considered the emotional heart of the city. Buildings on the main commercial strip or Grand Rue, the Saint Croix Hospital, and the tribunal de paix ("court of the peace") building were all destroyed or heavily damaged by the earthquake.

British urban search and rescue teams with Rapid-UK along with the Icelandic search and rescue team were the first to reach the destroyed town on January 17, 2010. The Canadian destroyer HMCS Athabaskan reached the area on Tuesday, 19 January. The Athabaskan's crew of 280 were tasked with supplying humanitarian aid to the city and assisting in relief efforts. A Japanese field hospital, Sri Lankan peacekeeper unit, and an Argentine White Helmets field hospital treated survivors, The Japanese and Argentinians arrived on the 18th. The Canadian Medical Assistance Team (CMAT) arrived on the 19th, and set to work performing surgeries.

The missionaries of World Wide Village set up outpatient clinics beside the Japanese Red Cross at the nursing school in Léogâne within days after the earthquake. Volunteer medical personal and teams of volunteer surgeons from World Wide Village and the University of Notre Dame examined and treated thousands of patients. World Wide Village set up a field hospital which began full operation in late February 2010 as the new Hospital St. Croix. World Wide Village and the University of Notre Dame continued to send teams to the nursing school and field hospital to meet ongoing health care needs in Léogâne.

The NGOs Heart to Heart International and Médecins Sans Frontières provided medical aid at clinical sites in the area.

As Léogâne has no airport, the Canadians used the small strip at Jacmel to avoid the bottleneck in Port-au-Prince and had 250–300 personnel there the next day. The Canadian 1 Field Hospital was deployed to Léogâne. The Cuban military set up a field hospital in the region as well.

Canadian soldiers provided security for food distribution points. The Canadian medical facility was located near the Japanese field hospital, which was next to the nursing school, which has been turned into a hospital. Canada deployed the Van Doos infantry regiment to help with recovery efforts. Haitian Girl Guides and Boy Scouts also helped with crowd control at some food distribution points.

With no airport in Léogâne, any aid needing to be airlifted in had to be carried by helicopter or through use of small planes on makeshift landing strips. The highway, Route 9, at Léogâne, was cordoned off by UN Peacekeepers to use as such a landing strip.

The Korean government deployed 250 peacekeepers to the region in February, composed mostly of engineers, some medical troops, and marines for security. The mission comprised 120 military engineers, 22 medics and a 1,200 tonne freighter filled with supplies and equipment. By February 18, 2010, the Korean Peacekeepers had started building a hospital. On 27 February 2010, 190 South Korean Peacekeepers left home for deployment in Léogâne and by February 28, 2010, 240 members of South Korean Peacekeepers (Task Force Danbi / Operation Danbi) had arrived.

The UN Food and Agriculture Organization started a "cash-for-work" program to clear irrigation canals in the Léogâne area.

By February 9, 2010, the US 24th Marine Expeditionary Unit was rotating out of Haiti, having been replaced by the US 22nd Marine Expeditionary Unit, in their positions on USS Bataan and Carrefour, Léogâne, Petit-Goâve, and Grand-Goâve.

On March 2, 2010, the IFRC decongested a refugee camp by creating a second one out of the overflow.

Once the victims of the earthquake were cared for, 1 Canadian Field Hospital began to treat patients with other serious illnesses. Many operations were performed on patients who traveled long distances to Léogâne for care. HMCS Athabaskan's mission ended on 10 March.

== Geography ==
=== Boundaries ===
Léogâne is bounded to the north by the Gulf of Gonâve, to the east by the commune of Gressier, to the south by the summit of the Massif de la Selle which separates it from the south-east (Jacmel), and to the west by the commune of Grand-Goâve.

=== Climate ===
Léogâne is a commune with widely diverse microclimates. The average temperature in Léogâne is warm and stays approximately the same throughout the year. Temperatures are almost always high in the lowland areas, ranging from 15 °C to 25 °C in the winter and from 25 °C to 30 °C during the summer. The lowland portion is relatively warm throughout the year; the dry mountains have moderate temperatures; the humid mountainous areas have very mild temperatures and fairly high humidity all year round. The annual rainfall is between 800 millimeters to 1277 millimeters.

=== Dry mountains ===
The dry mountains in Léogâne receive less than 800 millimeters of rain annually. The areas in this group include Fond de Boudin, Palmiste à Vin, Gros Morne, Cormiers, Petit-Harpon, and Citronnier.

=== Humid mountains ===
The humid mountains in Léogâne receive more than 800 millimeters of rainfall yearly. This areas in this group include Orangers, Aux-Parques, Beauséjour, and Fond d'Oie.

=== Irrigation ===
The commune of Léogâne has six rivers (Rouyonne, Momance, Cormier, Ravine Seche, Haut-Saut, and Courbyon, in addition to nineteen streams, two ponds and a lagoon. Despite the abundance of water in the region, only three communal sections are irrigable: Dessources, Petite-Rivière and Grande-Rivière. These sections are crossed by several rivers and streams, some more important than others. The Momance River in Grande-Rivière, for example, is the most significant river in Léogâne, because it is widely used for irrigation purposes. This river also has the potential to generate renewable energy via hydro-electricity.

== Economy ==
The economy in Léogâne remains predominately agricultural despite the challenges that are facing the sector in the commune. The sugarcane industry holds the largest share in the economy. The sugarcane industry is closely followed by the banana industry and then grains such as maize, sorghum and rice. Legumes and foodstuffs such as sweet potatoes, cassava, beans, and yams complete this chain. A significant amount of fishing and farming is practiced throughout the coastal areas. Aviculture and apiculture farms have been rapidly expanding in recent years.

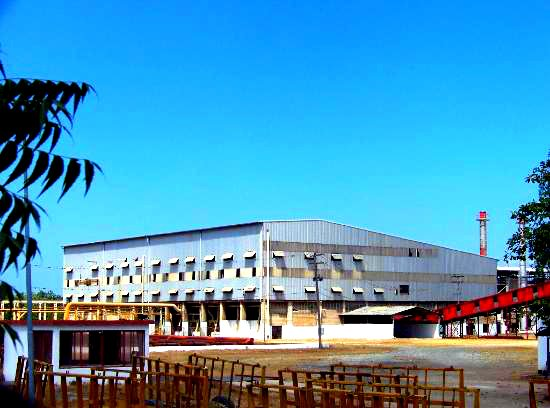
Sugar Mill in Darbonne Léogâne.

The Jean Léopold Dominique sugar mill in Darbonne produces surplus cane molasses, some of which is supplied to the smaller alcohol distilleries around the commune. The sugar mill has a production capacity of 375,000 metric tons of sugar; it also has the ability to produce 22 megawatts (MW) of electricity.

Coffee is a crop of vital importance to the entire national economy. It is one of the major cash crops for Léogâne's peasants living in the humid mountain areas considered ecologically strategic for the country. Nearly 200,000 households at the national level are engaged in coffee growing with at least 20% of their annual income derived from coffee, providing them with cash income for family expenses including education, health, and investing in cattle and the construction of houses. Tombe Gateau Léogâne is home to the largest coffee mill in Haiti which serves the Southeast region, Center, Artibonite, and Grande-Anse. The Federation of Native Coffee Associations (FACN), is the owner of the trademark "Haitian Bleu", a blend of coffee beans.

The production of building materials plays an important role in the local economy and is in fierce competition with the agricultural sector. Construction enterprises are emerging at such an alarming rate that many territories that were once occupied by crops are now restricted to concrete. Two other sub-sectors occupy a statistically relevant role in the economy; transportation and private schools.

Proximity to the metropolitan area of Port-au-Prince is also of economic significance to Léogâne. It constitutes a market exceeding two million potential customers, excluding the five hundred thousand people living in the Region Des Palmes or palm tree region. The abundant labor force constitutes another important production factor in Léogâne. The region's population consists of more than 55% young adults who are willing and able to work. Léogâne has the capacity for 100,000 active farmers to enter the labor market, excluding prospective workers coming from neighboring municipalities.

=== Tourism ===
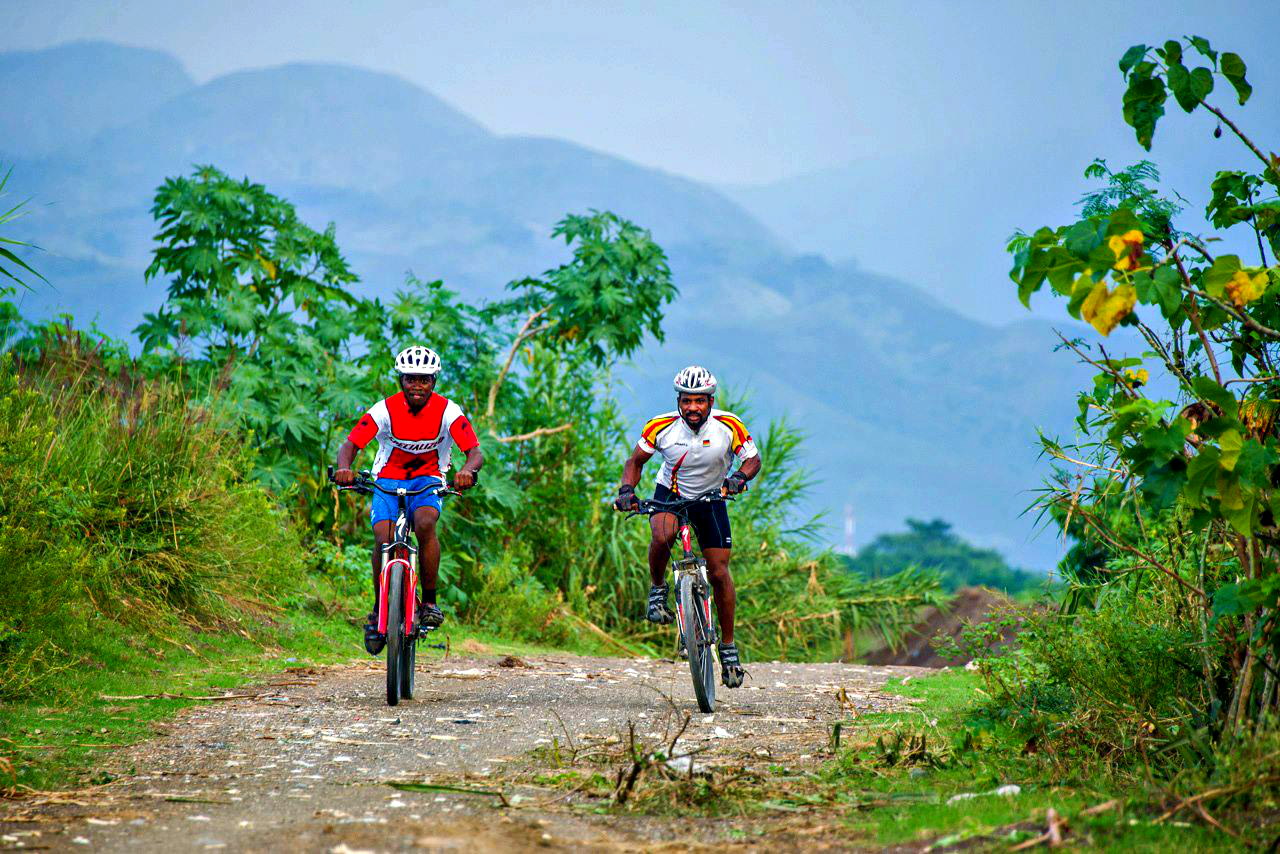
Léogâne Cycling Club (LCC)

Léogâne has many tourist attractions including renovated historical sites such as Fort Campan, Latounèl Gwoso, and one of the most ancient windmills in the western hemisphere, located in Baussan.

Léogâne is also a home to thousands of local plants and natural species and the best way to explore the exotic flora and fauna in Léogâne is on foot. Ayiti (Haiti), which was the native name given to the entire island of Hispaniola to mean, "Land of high mountains", has many mountains. Ten of the thirteen communal sections of Léogâne are located in the mountains which cover an area of more than 25,000 acres. The rehabilitation of natural caves such as the grotto Belloc, Anacaona, and Fond d'Oie offers visitors a unique experience in Léogâne. Léogâne also has twenty-five kilometers of sandy beaches.

Hiking is quite a popular activity in Léogâne among visitors and with the success of Mountain Bike Ayiti (MTB Ayiti), an event hosted by the Léogâne Cycling Club (LCC) in 2013, Léogâne has become a destination for adventure tourism.

Each year thousands of people from all over the country make religious pilgrimages to Léogâne to visit the many patron Saints in the area. No other place in Haiti houses more religious pilgrimages sites than Léogâne, from Saint Dominique to Saints André, Antoine, Gérard, Philogène, and Saintes Thérèse and Rose.

Léogâne is the host location for several annual cultural events which attract thousands of national and international visitors to the city each year, notably Rara and Fête Champêtre.

== Culture ==
=== Rara ===
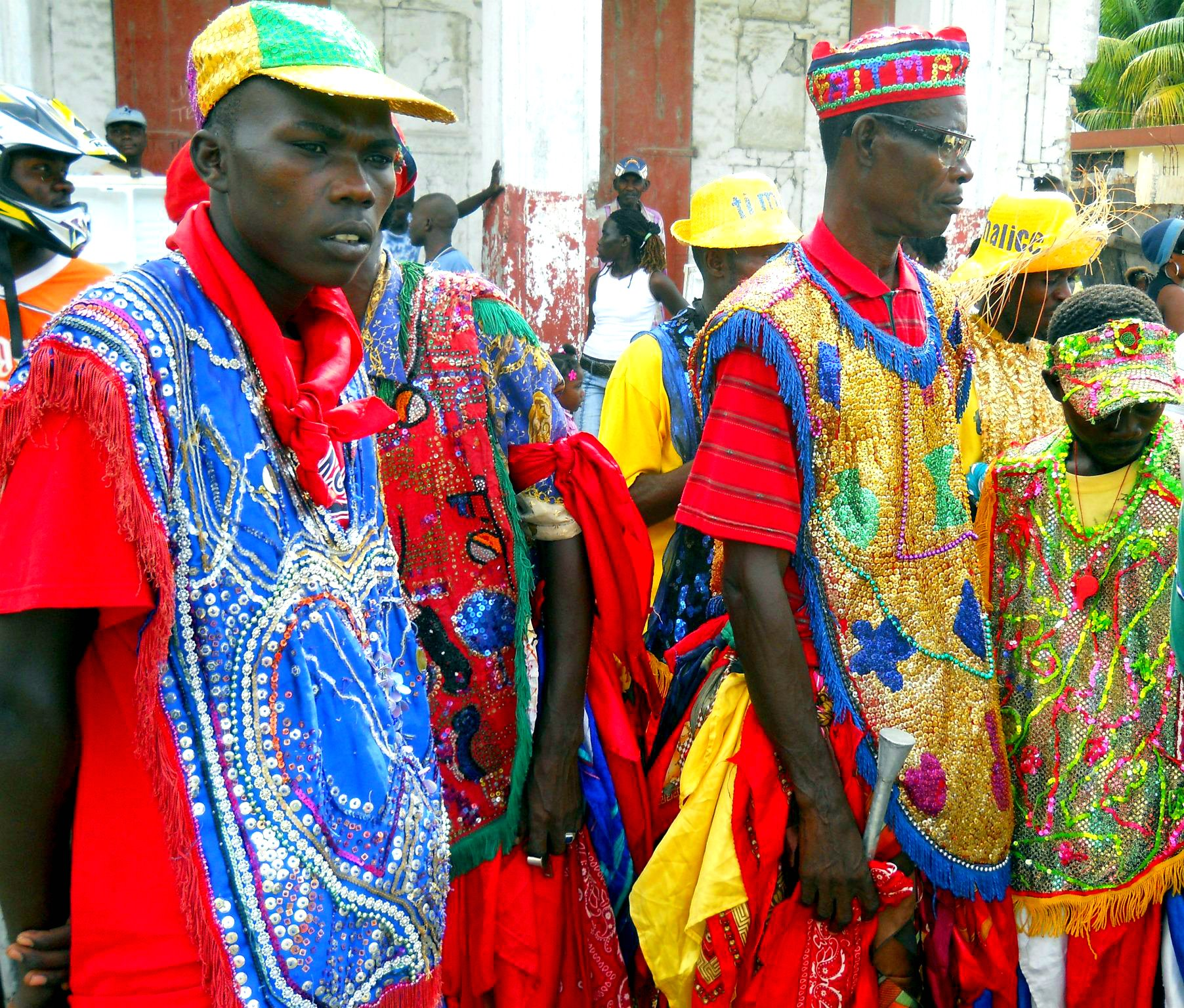
Majò Jon Rara Léogâne

Léogâne is the bastion of Rara, a rural festival that is one of the most popular cultural events of Haitian origin, dating to colonial times. The boisterous Rara season starts with the Carnival and keeps going through Lent, culminating in Easter week. The phenomenon of Rara is at once a season, a festival, a genre of music, a religious ritual, a form of dance, and sometimes a technique of political protest. The town of Léogâne is best known for its Rara but the festival is practiced all over Haiti and is different from region to region.

Local Rara societies form musical parading bands that walk for miles through local territory, attracting fans and singing old and new songs. Rara bands often stop at crossroads, the homes of community leaders and important religious spots—cemeteries for example, where they salute their ancestors. Musicians play drums, sing, and sound bamboo horns and tin trumpets. The typical Rara orchestra consists of drums followed by bamboo instruments called bamboo or vaccine, some metal horns called konet, and then several waves of percussion players with small, hand-held instruments like the maraca, and finally a chorus of singers.

Rara has evolved into an important contributor to the local economy. Rara season attracts positive media attention and stimulates commercial activity that generates significant revenue for the cultural, tourism, and hospitality industries by drawing many visitors to Léogâne. The net result has been the growth of rara-driven festival tourism that has created an alternative and sustainable source of revenue for the city.

=== Religion ===
The centerpiece of the city was the now-destroyed Roman Catholic Sainte Rose de Lima Church.

== Health ==
Prior to the earthquake, there was a hospital run by the Episcopalian Diocese, with Presbyterian missionary collaboration; Hopital Sainte-Croix (Holy Cross). The hospital had closed to inpatients two years previously, and although it had continued with a variety of outpatient services, it is since restored to a being full service healthcare institution.

== Education ==
Since 2005 (before the 12 January 2010 earthquake) the city has had an Episcopalian nursing school, Faculté des Sciences Infirmières de l'Université Épiscopale d'Haïti à Léogâne.

A new Catholic school, "Notre Dame des Anges", run by the Jesuits (the Society of Jesus), and made possible by money sent from the Vatican, was dedicated by Catholic and government officials on Thursday, 27 November 2014, about five years after the 12 January 2010 earthquake.

== Sport ==
Léogâne is home to five major league sports teams: the Léogâne Cycling Club (LCC), Cavaly Association Sportive Club (CASPORT), League Basketball Léogânaise (LBL), the Valencia Football Club (VFC), and the Anacaona Football Club (AFC).

The Léogâne Cycling Club (LCC) came into being 15 December 2002 following a race that was organized in the region in which many of the participating cyclists weren't members of any particular club at the time. These athletes joined together to form the Léogâne Cycling Club and elected Jonas Ronald as the club's president. In 2013, the Léogâne Cycling Club and Mountain Bike Ayiti together hosted the first-ever International mountain bike competition in Haiti.

The Cavaly Association Sportive Club (CASPORT) is a Haitian professional soccer club based in Léogâne. Founded May 10, 1975 in Léogâne, this club has represented Haiti in the Concacaf Competitions of Clubs in 2009 and several of its former players have secured professional contracts in Asia, Europe, Latin America, and the United States.

The Valencia Football Club (VFC) is a Haitian professional soccer club located in Léogâne. The club plays in Haiti's top national league, the Ligue Haïtienne. Valencia FC was founded on June 27, 1972. The club won its first national championship in 2012 and several of its former players have secured professional contracts in Asia, Europe, Latin America, and the United States.

== Organizations ==
Johanniter International built top of the bill rehabilitation center in Léogâne, which was donated to the Seventh Day Adventist Hospital, and six community clinics in the region of Léogâne. They trained more than 30,000 villagers in disaster reduction and preparation.

Deep Springs International (sponsor of Gadyen Dlo) and the Children's Nutrition Program are based in Léogâne.

The University of Notre Dame of Indiana, U.S., is hosted by the Sainte Croix Hospital and, with the U.S. Centers for Disease Control and Prevention, assists the hospital in conducting a Ministry of Health-sanctioned reference center to research, treat and control the mosquito-borne disease lymphatic filariasis (also known as elephantiasis).

GOALS (Global Outreach and Love of Soccer) is a permanent sport-for-development organization in Léogâne which uses soccer to mobilize youth to improve health, the environment and local leadership.

La Faculté des Sciences Infirmières de l'Université Épiscopale d'Haïti à Léogâne (FSIL) is a nursing school located in Léogâne.

Éditions Ruptures (Association Éditoriale Ruptures) is a pioneer editorial and publishing institution in Haiti established in 2009,i n Léogâne. Initially, it aimed at helping young and disenfranchised Haitian writers to publish their work at a time when publishing and editorial services were a luxury in Haiti. In 2016, it established the Josaphat Robert Large Cultural Center to extend cultural and educational services to a broader community.

== Notable people ==
- Anacaona, Queen Anacaona (from Taíno anacaona, meaning "golden flower"; from ana, meaning "flower", and caona, meaning "gold, golden") was a Taíno cacica (chief), sister of Bohechío, chief of Xaragua. Anacaona was born in Yaguana (today the town of Léogâne, Haiti) in 1474.
- Coupé Cloué (10 May 1925 – 29 January 1998), born Jean Gesner Henry but popularly known as Coupé Cloué, was a Haïtian footballer, singer, guitarist, and bandleader. He was born in Tombe Gateau, Léogâne.
- Edwidge Danticat (born 19 January 1969), is a Haitian-American author. She was born in Port-au-Prince to a family originating in Mathieu, Léogâne.
- Simone Duvalier, Simone Ovide Duvalier (c. 1913 – 1997), was the wife of Haitian President François "Papa Doc" Duvalier (1907–1971), and the mother of Haitian President Jean-Claude "Baby Doc" Duvalier. She was born Simone Ovide in 1913 in Orangers, Léogâne the daughter of a mulatto merchant and writer Jules Faine and Célie Ovide.
- Marie-Claire Heureuse Félicité, Empress of Haiti (1804–1806), the wife of Haitian Emperor Jean-Jacques Dessalines. She was born in Léogâne the daughter of Guillaume Bonheur and Marie-Élisabeth Sainte-Lobelot.
- Pierre Garçon (born 8 August 1986), is a Haitian-American football wide receiver (WR) of the National Football League. Pierre Garçon's family is from Petite-Rivière, Léogâne.
- Joseph Balthazar Inginac (born 1775), was a Haitian general better known as Balthazar Inginac. He served as personal secretary for President Alexandre Petion and Jean-Pierre Boyer of Haiti.
- Ricardo Pierre-Louis (born 2 November 1984), is a Haitian professional soccer player who played for the Cape Cod Crusaders in the USL Premier Development League.
- Pascal Millien (born 3 May 1986), is a Haitian professional footballer who currently plays for Winter Haven United F.C.
- Dias Thelus Films (born 23 July 2001), is a Haitian-American filmmaker and videographer

== Citations ==
- "Leogane". The Columbia Gazetteer of North America, edited by Saul B. Cohen. New York: Columbia University Press, 2000.. Retrieved 21 June 2006
- The Louverture Project Wiki
