= Rivière de Grand Goâve =

Coordinates: 18°26′N 72°46′W

Location
- Country: Haiti

The Rivière de Grand Goâve is a river of Haiti.

The 12 January 2010 7.0 tremor created a landslide which formed a landslide dam blocking the river, that can potentially contain a large basin of water. Though it is now dry, the wet season is approaching, and a dam collapse would directly outflow the contents through the city of Grand-Goâve. The dam is located a dozen kilometres from the city of Grand-Goâve.

== See also ==
- List of rivers of Haiti
