= Université Franco-Haïtienne du Cap-Haïtien =

University in Haiti

Coordinates: 19.732045°N 72.184077°W

- Type: Private university
- Established: 1 August 2011; 14 years ago
- Rector: Dr. Wander Numa
- Location: Cap-Haïtien, Haiti

Université Franco-Haïtienne du Cap-Haïtien (French pronunciation: [ynivɛʁsite fʁɑ̃ko aisjɛn dy kap aisjɛ̃], UFCH) is an academic institution in Haiti that offers courses in arts, humanities and social sciences. It is the first university to offer distance learning courses.

Currently it offers undergraduate and graduate levels programs. It has a university cooperation agreement with the Paul Valéry University, Montpellier III in France. The rector is Dr. Wander Numa.

== See also ==
- France–Haiti relations
