= Grand-Goâve =

Grand-Goâve Grangwav
- Commune
- Nickname: Aguava
- Location in Haiti
- Coordinates: 18°25′44″N 72°46′14″W
- Country: Haiti
- Department: Ouest
- Arrondissement: Léogâne

Government
  - Mayor: Kesnel Édouard
  - City Manager: Wilkens Saint-Guillaume

Population (2009)
  - Total: 19,874
- Time zone: UTC-05:00 (EST)
  - Summer (DST): UTC-04:00 (EDT)

Grand-Goâve (French pronunciation: [ɡʁɑ̃ ɡɔav]; Haitian Creole: Grangwav) is a commune in the Léogâne Arrondissement in the Ouest department of southwestern Haiti.

The Rivière de Grand Goâve passes to the east of the town. It is bridged by National Route No. 2 to the south and forded by Rue Tonnere to the east.

== History ==
The town is one of the oldest cities of the country, and was named Goâve by the Amerindians. The Spanish called it Aguava at the end of the 16th century. After French colonization through the releasing of the Spanish, the French divided the city into two halves, Grand-Goâve and Petit-Goâve.

=== 2010 earthquake ===
Grand-Goâve was 90% destroyed by the earthquake of 12 January 2010. All public buildings were destroyed, including the schools, city hall, and police station. The trembling created a landslide which formed a landslide dam that can potentially contain a large basin of water. A dam collapse would directly outflow the contents through the city. The dam is located on the Rivière de Grand Goâve, a dozen kilometres from the city.

On the 19th, 1300 US Marines were deployed equally between Petit-Goâve and Grand-Goâve. Catholic Relief Services have been distributing the aid that the US military has been delivering. USS Bataan was deployed in Baie de Grand Goâve to help rebuild Grand-Goâve.

As of 9 February 2010, the US 24th Marine Expeditionary Unit is rotating out of Haiti, having been replaced by the US 22nd Marine Expeditionary Unit, in their position on USS Bataan and Carrefour, Léogâne, Grand-Goâve and Petit-Goâve.
