= Momance River =

Coordinates: 18°34′N 72°34′W

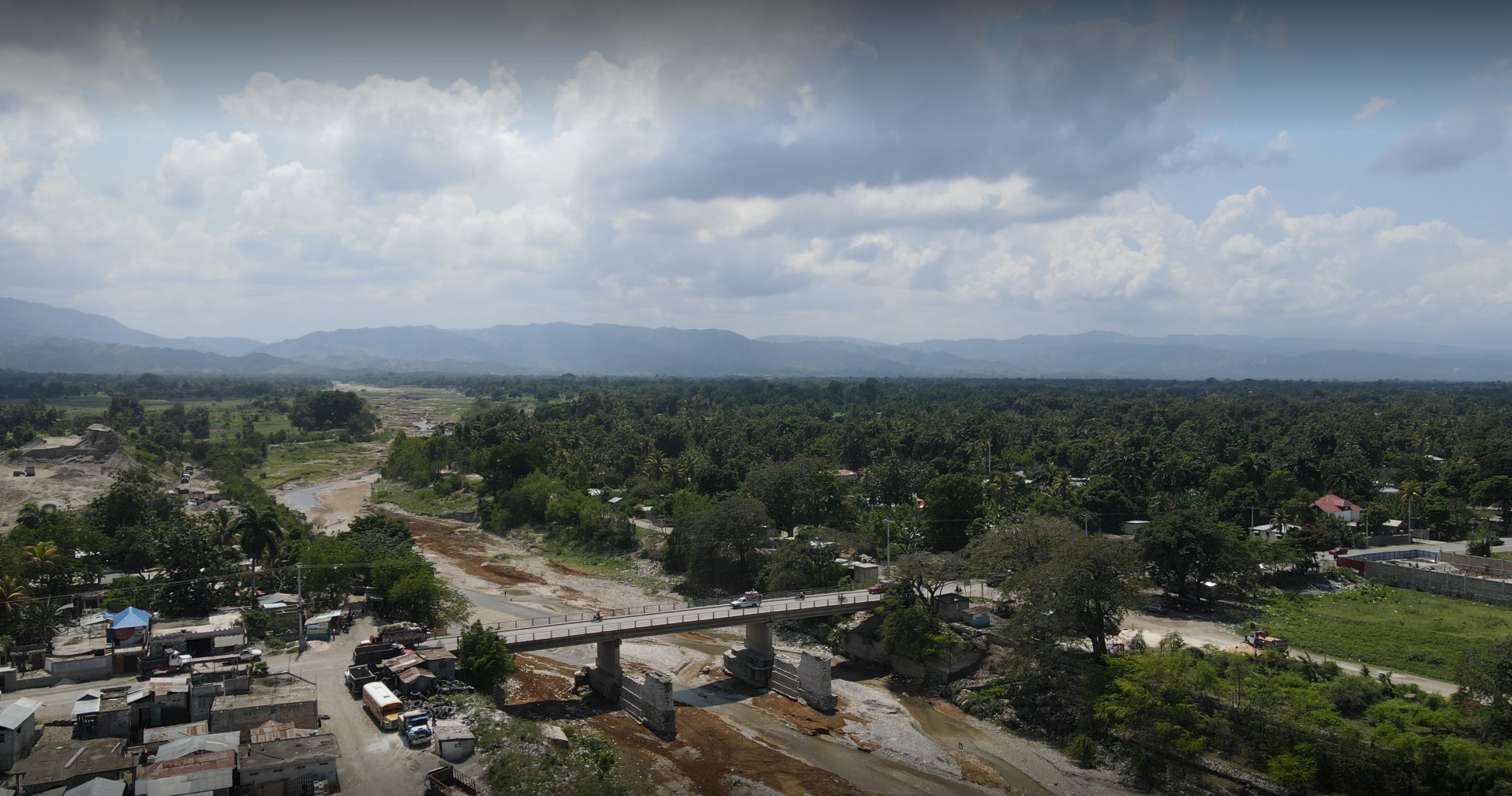
- Momance River at the Momance River Bridge (Route Nationale #2)

Location
- Country: Haiti

The Momance River is a river of Haiti.

== See also ==
- List of rivers of Haiti
