= Gulf of Gonâve =

Gulf on the western coast of Haiti

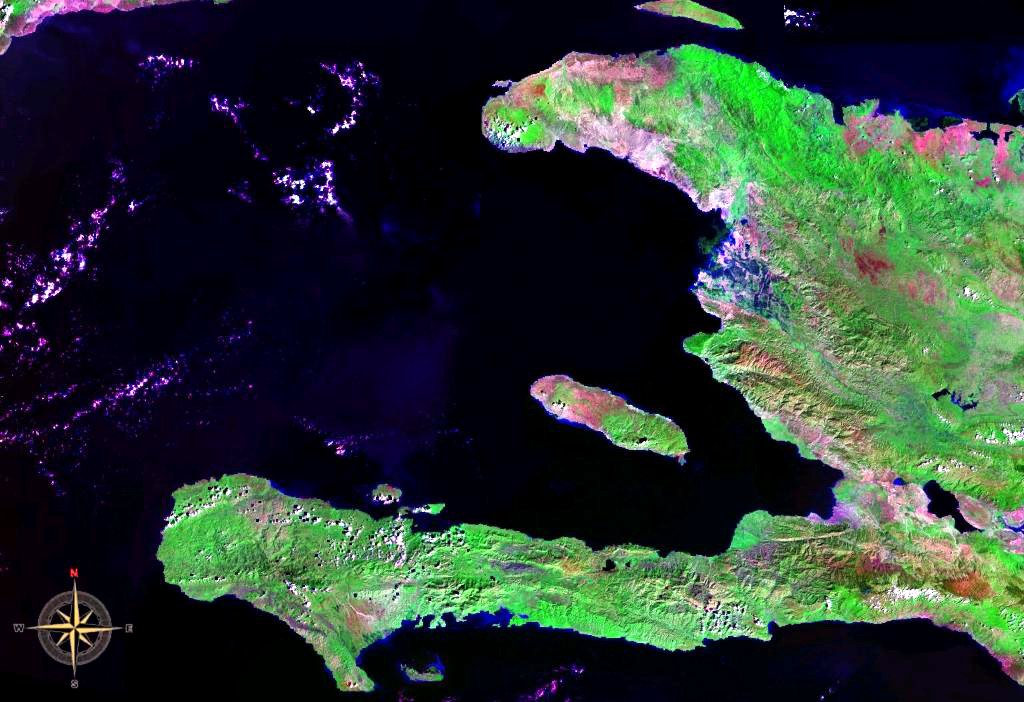
- Gulf of Gonâve seen from space (false color)

- Coordinates: 19°00′N 73°30′W
- Basin countries: Haiti

The Gulf of Gonâve (French: Golfe de la Gonâve, pronounced [ɡɔlf də la ɡɔnav]; Haitian Creole: Gòf Lagonav) is a large gulf of the Caribbean Sea along the western coast of Haiti. Haiti's capital city, Port-au-Prince, is located on the coast of the gulf. Other cities on the gulf coast include Gonaïves, Saint-Marc, Léogane, Miragoâne, and Jérémie. Several islands are located in the gulf, the largest being Gonâve Island, followed by the much smaller Cayemites.

The Gulf is more than 500 km in length from Mole-Saint-Nicolas to Abricots and it consist of more than a dozen bays and harbors. The Port-au-Prince Bay is the largest in the country and one of the biggest in the Caribbean.

== See also ==
- List of rivers of Haiti
