= Léogâne Arrondissement =

Coordinates: 18.5108°N 72.6339°W

Léogâne Arrondissement Arrondissement de Léogâne Awondisman Leyogàn
- Arrondissement
- Interactive map of Léogâne Arrondissement
- Country: Haiti
- Department: Ouest

Area
  - Arrondissement: 1,015.90 km^{2} (392.24 sq mi)
  - Urban: 18.83 km^{2} (7.27 sq mi)
  - Rural: 997.07 km^{2} (384.97 sq mi)

Population (2015)
  - Arrondissement: 509,280
  - Density: 501.31/km^{2} (1,298.4/sq mi)
  - Urban: 324,475
  - Rural: 184,805
- Time zone: UTC-5 (Eastern)
- Postal code: HT62—
- Communes: 3
- Communal Sections: 32
- IHSI Code: 012

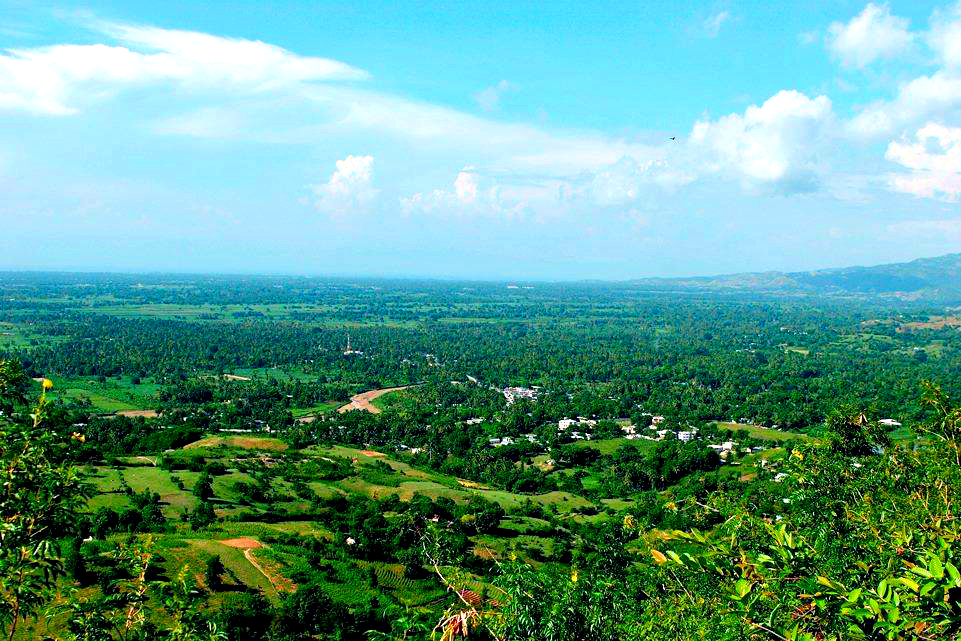
Léogâne, Haiti

Léogâne (Haitian Creole: Leyogàn) is an arrondissement in the Ouest Department of Haiti. As of 2015, the population was 509,280 inhabitants. Postal codes in the Léogâne Arrondissement start with the number 62.

The arrondissement consists of the following communes:

- Léogâne
- Petit-Goâve
- Grand-Goâve

== History ==
=== 2010 7.0 earthquake ===
On 12 January 2010, a 7.0 magnitude earthquake struck the arrondissement. The city of Léogâne was estimated to be 80–90% destroyed. Petit Goâve was greatly affected by the quake. All public buildings in Grand-Goâve were destroyed.

== See also ==
- Trouin, Haiti
