= 2010 Haiti earthquake =

Magnitude 7.0 Mw earthquake

- Goudougoudou
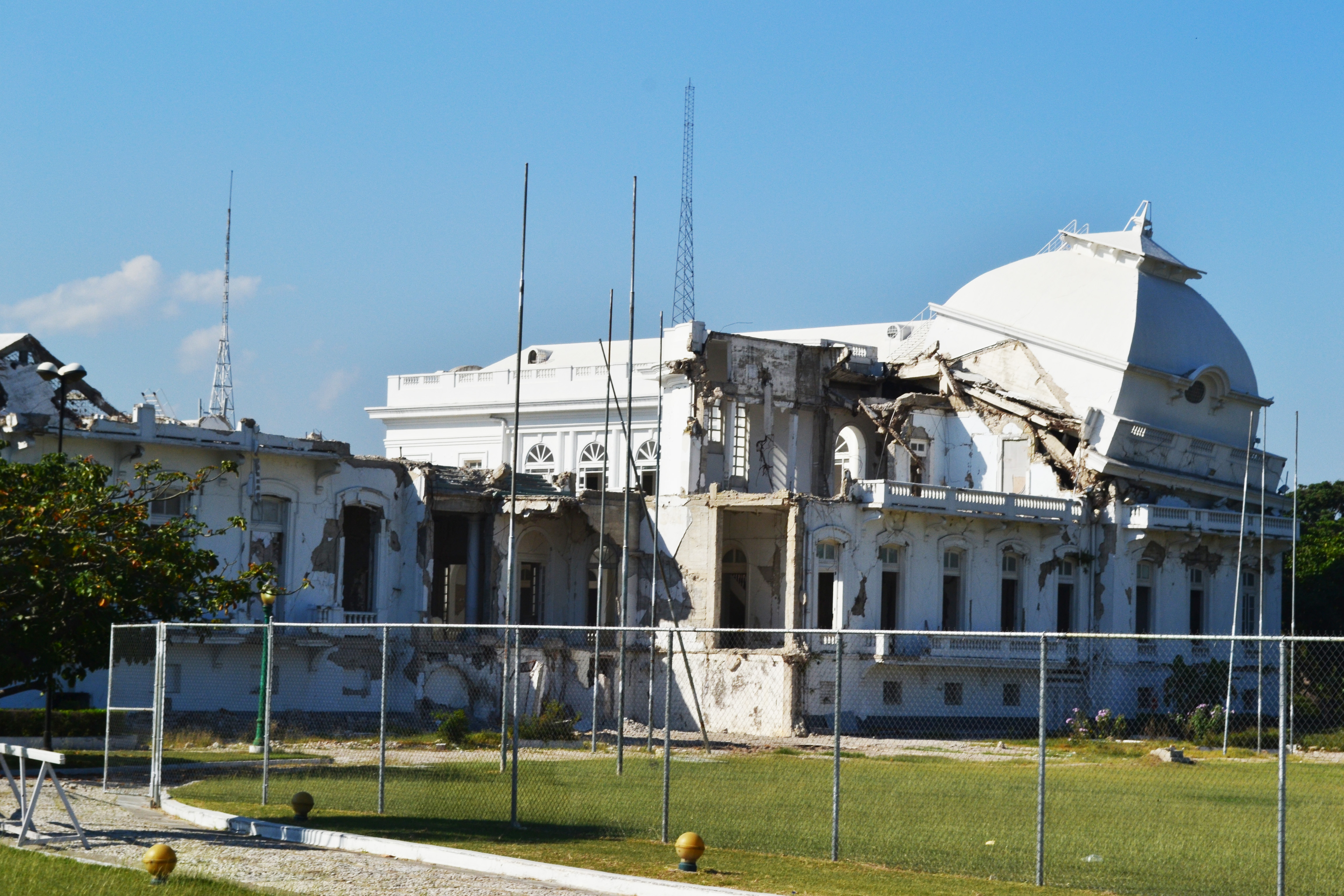
- The heavily damaged National Palace of Haiti after the earthquake

- Location within Haiti
- UTC time: 2010-01-12 21:53:10
- ISC event: 14226221
- USGS-ANSS: ComCat
- Local date: 12 January 2010
- Local time: 16:53:10 EST
- Duration: 30 seconds
- Magnitude: 7.0 M_{w}
- Depth: 13 km (8.1 mi)
- Epicenter: 18°28′N 72°32′W
- Fault: Enriquillo–Plantain Garden fault zone
- Areas affected: Haiti, Dominican Republic
- Total damage: $7.8 billion – 8.5 billion
- Max. intensity: MMI X (Extreme)
- Peak acceleration: 0.5 g
- Tsunami: 3 m (9.8 ft)
- Casualties: 100,000–160,000 dead (Note: The Haitian government estimated the death toll to range from 220,000 to 316,000, although these figures are from a government estimate widely charged with being deliberately inflated and a matter of some dispute. A figure of about 160,000 is provided in a 2010 University of Michigan study.)

A catastrophic magnitude 7.0 M_{w} earthquake struck Haiti at 16:53 local time (21:53 UTC) on Tuesday, 12 January 2010. The epicenter was near the town of Léogâne, Ouest department, approximately 25 kilometres (16 mi) west of Port-au-Prince, Haiti's capital. The earthquake is locally nicknamed Goudougoudou, an onomatopoeia for the sound of collapsing buildings.

By 24 January, at least 52 aftershocks measuring 4.5 or greater had been recorded. An estimated three million people were affected by the quake. Death toll estimates range from 100,000 to about 160,000; the Haitian government estimated the death toll to range from 220,000 to 316,000, although these figures are a matter of some dispute. The earthquake is the deadliest natural disaster of the 21st century for a single country. The government of Haiti estimated that 250,000 residences and 30,000 commercial buildings had collapsed or were severely damaged. Haiti's history of national debt, prejudicial trade policies by other countries, and foreign intervention into national affairs contributed to the existing poverty and poor housing conditions that increased the death toll from the disaster.

The earthquake caused major damage in Port-au-Prince, Jacmel and other cities in the region. Notable landmark buildings were significantly damaged or destroyed, including the Presidential Palace, the National Assembly building, the Port-au-Prince Cathedral, and the main jail. Among those killed were Archbishop of Port-au-Prince Joseph Serge Miot and opposition leader Micha Gaillard. The headquarters of the United Nations Stabilization Mission in Haiti (MINUSTAH), located in the capital, collapsed, killing many, including the mission's chief, Hédi Annabi.

Many countries responded to appeals for humanitarian aid, pledging funds and dispatching rescue and medical teams, engineers and support personnel. The most-watched telethon in history aired on 22 January, called Hope for Haiti Now, raising US$58 million by the next day. Communication systems, air, land, and sea transport facilities, hospitals, and electrical networks had been damaged by the earthquake, which hampered rescue and aid efforts; confusion over who was in charge, air traffic congestion, and problems with prioritising flights further complicated early relief work. Port-au-Prince's morgues were overwhelmed with tens of thousands of bodies. These had to be buried in mass graves.

As rescues tailed off, supplies, medical care and sanitation became priorities. Delays in aid distribution led to angry appeals from aid workers and survivors, and looting and sporadic violence were observed. On 22 January, the United Nations noted that the emergency phase of the relief operation was drawing to a close, and on the following day, the Haitian government officially called off the search for survivors.

== Background ==
The island of Hispaniola, shared by Haiti and the Dominican Republic, is seismically active and has a history of destructive earthquakes. During Haiti's time as a French colony, earthquakes were recorded by French historian Moreau de Saint-Méry (1750–1819). He described damage done by an earthquake in 1751, writing that "only one masonry building had not collapsed" in Port-au-Prince; he also wrote that the "whole city collapsed" in the 1770 Port-au-Prince earthquake. Cap-Haïtien, other towns in the north of Haiti and the Dominican Republic, and the Sans-Souci Palace were destroyed during an earthquake on 7 May 1842. A magnitude 8.0 earthquake struck the Dominican Republic and shook Haiti on 4 August 1946, producing a tsunami that killed 1,790 people and injured many others.

Haiti is the poorest country in the Western Hemisphere and is ranked 149th of 182 countries on the Human Development Index. The Australian government's travel advisory site had previously expressed concerns that Haitian emergency services would be unable to cope in the event of a major disaster, and the country is considered "economically vulnerable" by the Food and Agriculture Organization. Haiti has experienced a number of natural disasters. In addition to earthquakes, it has been struck frequently by tropical cyclones, which have caused flooding and widespread damage. The most recent cyclones to hit the island before the earthquake were Tropical Storm Fay and hurricanes Gustav, Hanna and Ike, all in the summer of 2008, causing nearly 800 deaths.

== Geology ==
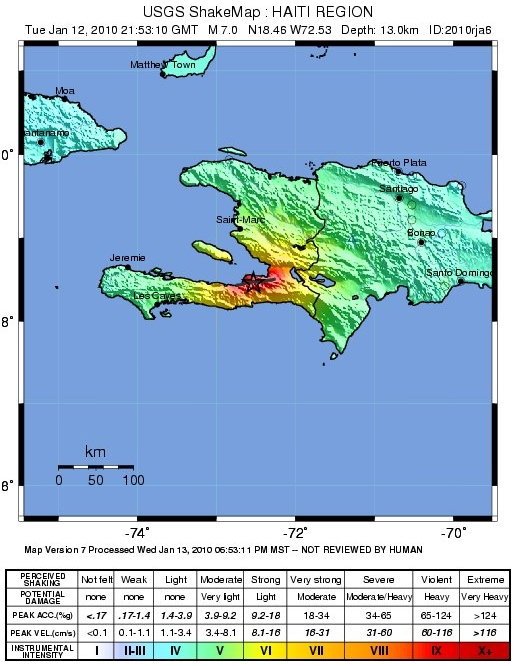
USGS intensity map

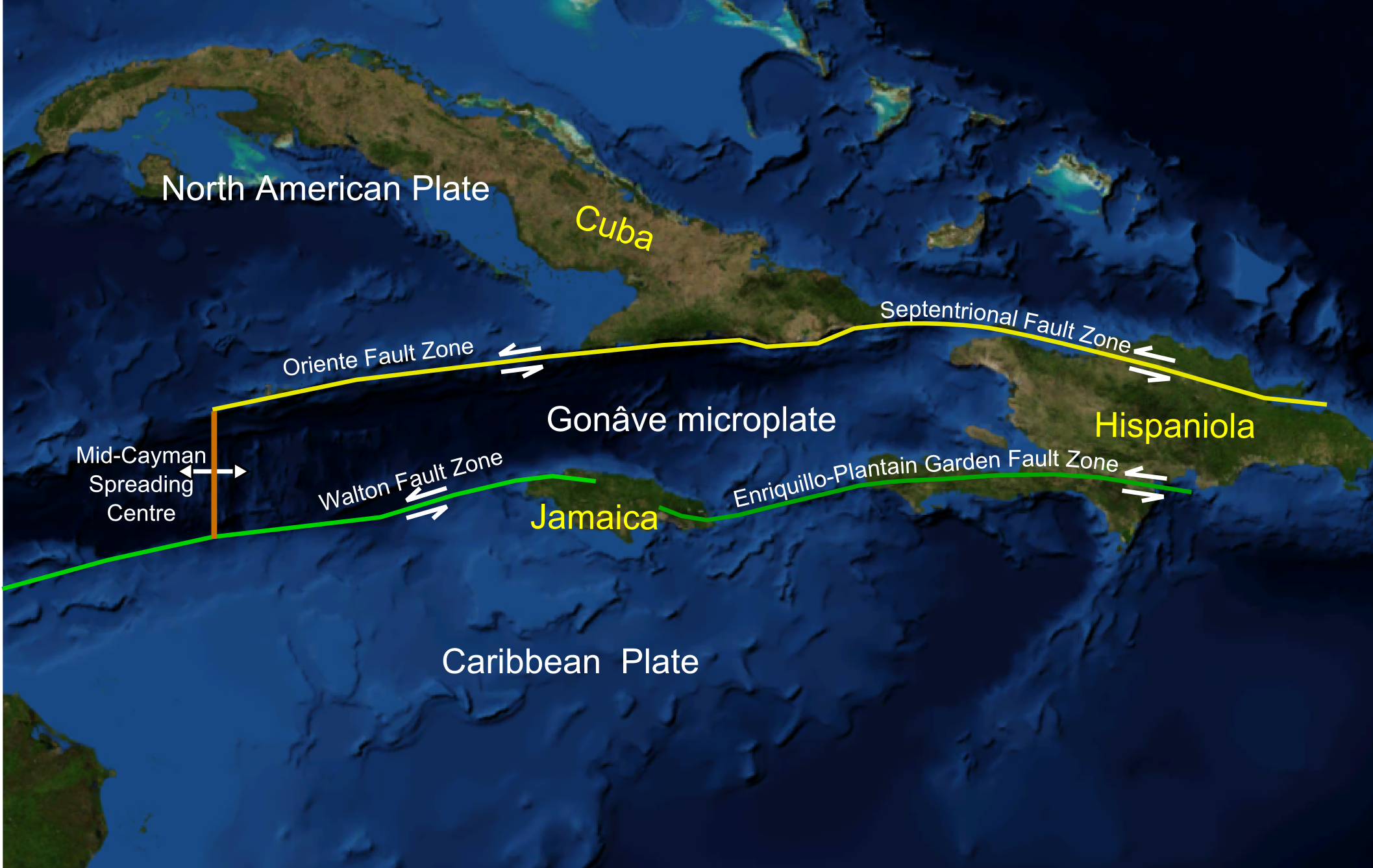
Map showing regional tectonic setting of the Enriquillo-Plantain Garden fault zone

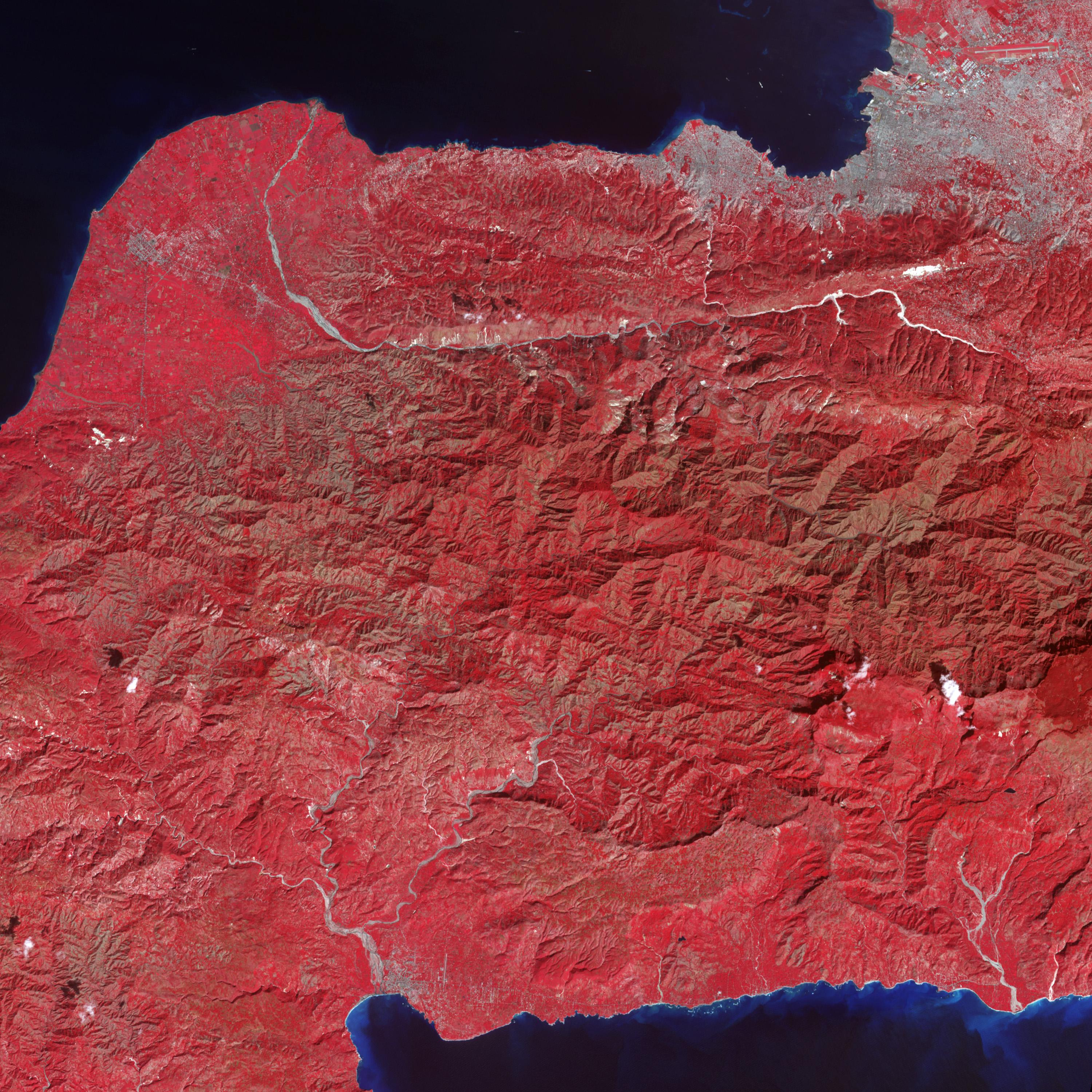
Tiny dots of white against the plant-covered landscape (red in this image) are possible landslides, a common occurrence in mountainous terrain after large earthquakes. The Enriquillo-Plantain Garden fault zone runs along the two linear valleys at the top of the image.

The magnitude 7.0 M_{w} earthquake occurred inland, on 12 January 2010 at 16:53 (UTC−05:00), approximately 25 km (16 mi) WSW from Port-au-Prince at a depth of 13 km (8.1 mi) on blind thrust faults associated with the Enriquillo-Plantain Garden fault system and lasted less than 30 seconds. There is no evidence of surface rupture; based on seismological, geological and ground deformation data, it is also thought that the earthquake did not involve significant lateral slip on the main Enriquillo fault. Strong shaking associated with intensity IX on the Modified Mercalli scale (MM) was recorded in Port-au-Prince and its suburbs. It was also felt in several surrounding countries and regions, including Cuba (MM III in Guantánamo), Jamaica (MM II in Kingston), Venezuela (MM II in Caracas), Puerto Rico (MM II–III in San Juan), and the bordering Dominican Republic (MM III in Santo Domingo). According to estimates from the U.S. Geological Survey, approximately 3.5 million people lived in the area that experienced shaking intensity of MM VII to X, a range that can cause moderate to very heavy damage even to earthquake-resistant structures. Shaking damage was more severe than for other quakes of similar magnitude due to the quake's shallow depth.

The quake occurred in the vicinity of the northern boundary where the Caribbean tectonic plate shifts eastwards by about 20 mm (0.79 in) per year in relation to the North American plate. The strike-slip fault system in the region has two branches in Haiti, the Septentrional-Oriente fault in the north and the Enriquillo-Plantain Garden fault in the south; both its location and focal mechanism suggested that the January 2010 quake was caused by a rupture of the Enriquillo-Plantain Garden fault, which had been locked for 250 years, gathering stress. However, a study published in May 2010 suggested that the rupture process may have involved slip on multiple blind thrust faults with only minor, deep, lateral slip along or near the main Enriquillo–Plantain Garden fault zone, suggesting that the event only partially relieved centuries of accumulated left-lateral strain on a small part of the plate-boundary system. The rupture was roughly 65 km (40 mi) long with mean slip of 1.8 metres (5 ft 11 in). Preliminary analysis of the slip distribution found amplitudes of up to about 4 m (13 ft) using ground motion records from all over the world.

A 2007 earthquake hazard study by C. DeMets and M. Wiggins-Grandison noted that the Enriquillo-Plantain Garden fault zone could be at the end of its seismic cycle and concluded that a worst-case forecast would involve a 7.2 M_{w} earthquake, similar in size to the 1692 Jamaica earthquake. Paul Mann and a group including the 2006 study team presented a hazard assessment of the Enriquillo-Plantain Garden fault system to the 18th Caribbean Geologic Conference in March 2008, noting the large strain; the team recommended "high priority" historical geologic rupture studies, as the fault was fully locked and had recorded few earthquakes in the preceding 40 years. An article published in Haiti's Le Matin newspaper in September 2008 cited comments by geologist Patrick Charles to the effect that there was a high risk of major seismic activity in Port-au-Prince.

=== Aftershocks ===
History of the main shock and aftershocks with magnitudes larger than 4.0, data from USGS

The U.S. Geological Survey recorded eight aftershocks in the two hours after the main earthquake, with magnitudes between 4.3 and 5.9. Within the first nine hours, 32 aftershocks of magnitude 4.2 or greater were recorded, 12 of which measured magnitude 5.0 or greater; in addition, on 24 January, the US Geological Survey reported that there had been 52 aftershocks measuring 4.5 or greater since the main quake.

On 20 January, at 06:03 local time (11:03 UTC), the strongest aftershock since the earthquake, measuring magnitude 5.9 M_{w}, struck Haiti. USGS reported its epicenter was about 56 km (35 mi) WSW of Port-au-Prince, which would place it almost exactly under the coastal town of Petit-Goâve. A UN representative reported that the aftershock collapsed seven buildings in the town. According to staff of the International Committee of the Red Cross, which had reached Petit-Goâve for the first time the day before the aftershock, the town was estimated to have lost 15% of its buildings, and was suffering the same shortages of supplies and medical care as the capital. Workers from the charity Save the Children reported hearing "already weakened structures collapsing" in Port-au-Prince, but most sources reported no further significant damage to infrastructure in the city. Further casualties are thought to have been minimal since people had been sleeping in the open. There are concerns that the main earthquake could be the beginning of a new long-term sequence: "the whole region is fearful"; historical accounts, although not precise, suggest that there has been a sequence of quakes progressing westwards along the fault, starting with an earthquake in the Dominican Republic in 1751.

=== Tsunami ===
The Pacific Tsunami Warning Center issued a tsunami warning immediately after the initial quake, but quickly cancelled it. Nearly two weeks later it was reported that the beach of the small fishing town of Petit Paradis was hit by a localised tsunami shortly after the earthquake, probably as a result of an underwater landslide, and this was later confirmed by researchers. At least three people were swept out to sea by the wave and were reported dead. Witnesses told reporters that the sea first retreated and a "very big wave" followed rapidly, crashing ashore and sweeping boats and debris into the ocean. The tsunami reached heights up to 3 m (9.8 ft).

== Damage to infrastructure ==
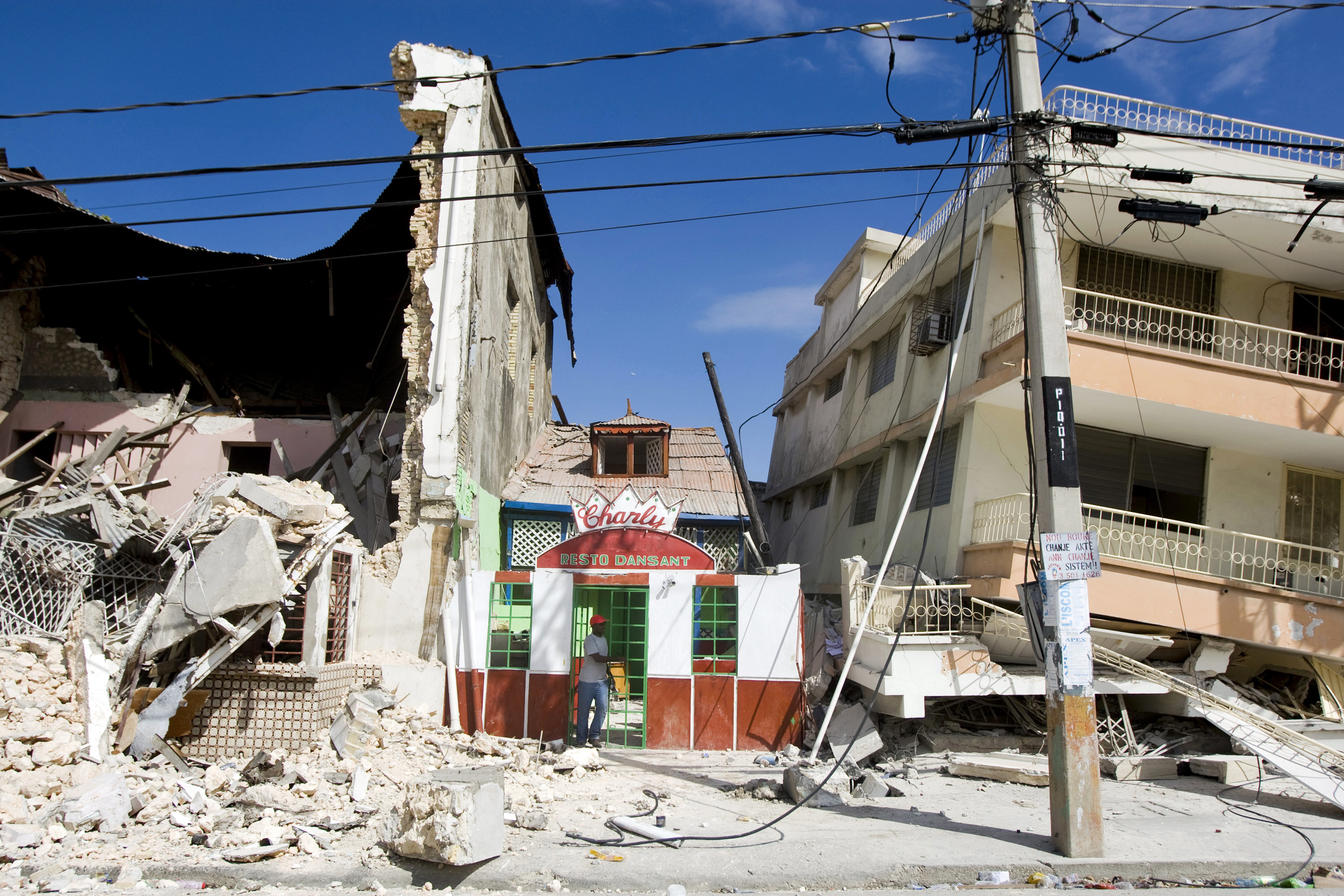
Damaged buildings in Port-au-Prince

=== Essential services ===
The quake affected the three Médecins Sans Frontières (Doctors Without Borders) medical facilities around Port-au-Prince, causing one to collapse completely. A hospital in Pétion-Ville, a wealthy suburb of Port-au-Prince, also collapsed, as did the St. Michel District Hospital in the southern town of Jacmel, which was the largest referral hospital in south-east Haiti.

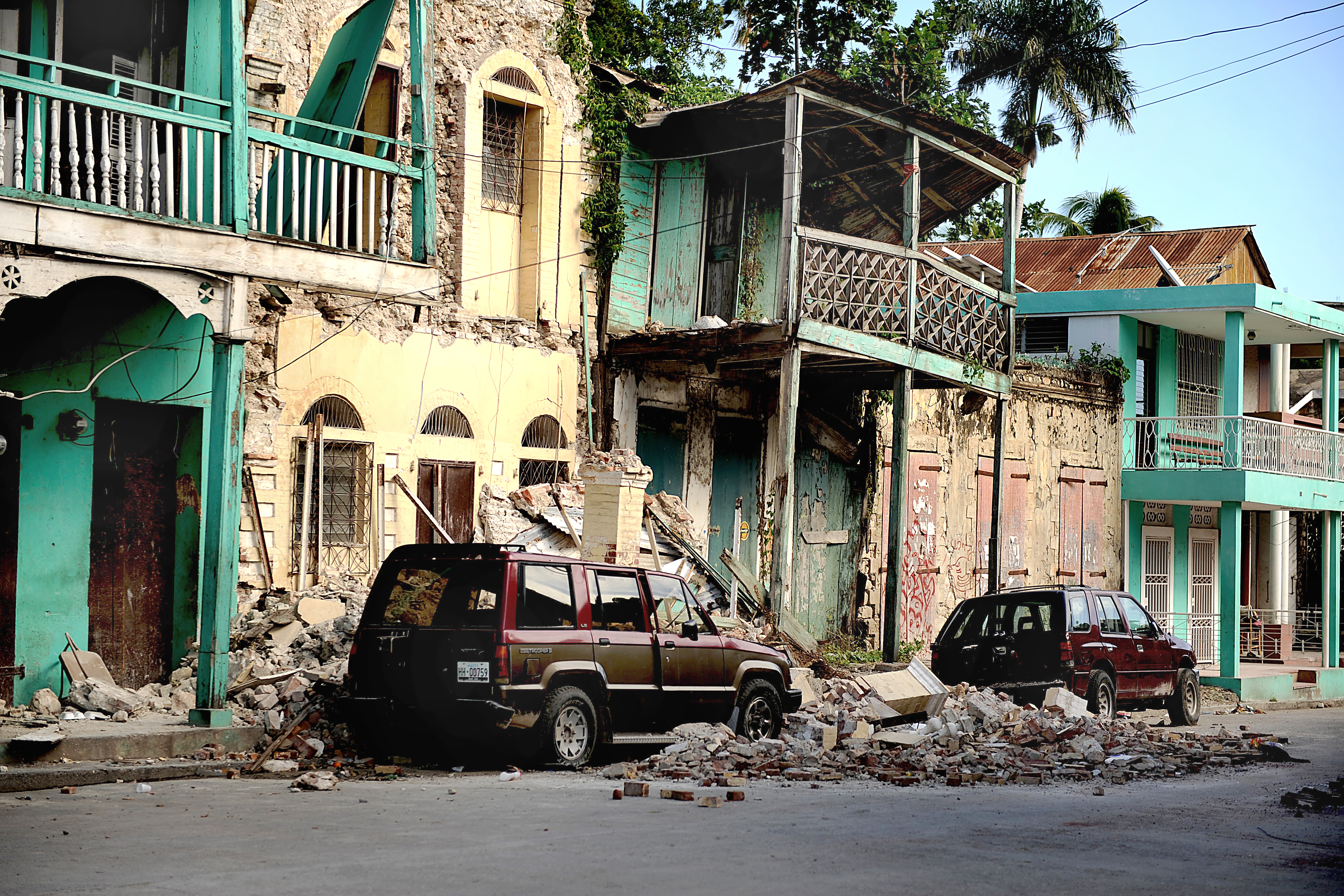
Damaged buildings in Jacmel

The quake seriously damaged the control tower at Toussaint L'Ouverture International Airport. Damage to the Port-au-Prince seaport rendered the harbor unusable for immediate rescue operations; its container crane subsided severely at an angle because of weak foundations. Gonaïves seaport in northern Haiti remained operational.

Roads were blocked with road debris or the surfaces broken. The main road linking Port-au-Prince with Jacmel remained blocked ten days after the earthquake, hampering delivery of aid to Jacmel. When asked why the road had not been opened, Hazem el-Zein, head of the south-east division of the UN World Food Programme said that "We ask the same questions to the people in charge...They promise rapid response. To be honest, I don't know why it hasn't been done. I can only think that their priority must be somewhere else."

There was considerable damage to communications infrastructure. The public telephone system was not available, and two of Haiti's largest cellular telephone providers, Digicel and Comcel Haiti, both reported that their services had been affected by the earthquake. Fibre-optic connectivity was also disrupted. According to Reporters Sans Frontières (RSF), Radio Lumière, which broadcasts out of Port-au-Prince and reaches 90% of Haiti, was initially knocked off the air, but it was able to resume broadcasting across most of its network within a week. According to RSF, some 20 of about 50 stations that were active in the capital region before the earthquake were back on air a week after the quake.

=== General infrastructure ===
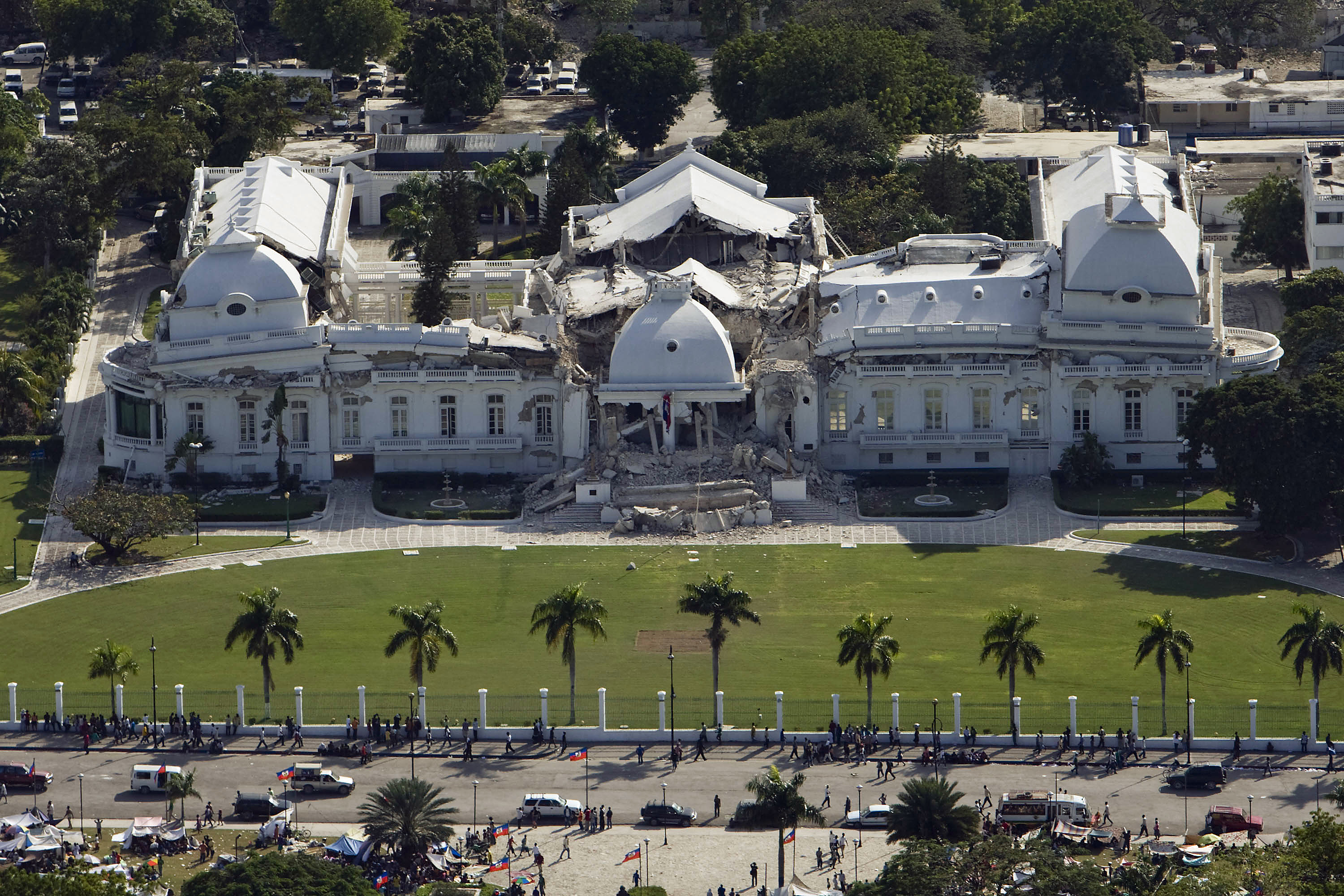
Large portions of the National Palace collapsed

In February 2010, Prime Minister Jean-Max Bellerive estimated that 250,000 residences and 30,000 commercial buildings were severely damaged and needed to be demolished. The deputy mayor of Léogâne reported that 90% of the town's buildings had been destroyed. Many government and public buildings were damaged or destroyed including the Palace of Justice, the National Assembly, the Supreme Court and Port-au-Prince Cathedral. The National Palace was severely damaged, though President René Préval and his wife Elisabeth Delatour Préval escaped without injury. The Prison Civile de Port-au-Prince was also destroyed, allowing around 4,000 inmates to escape.

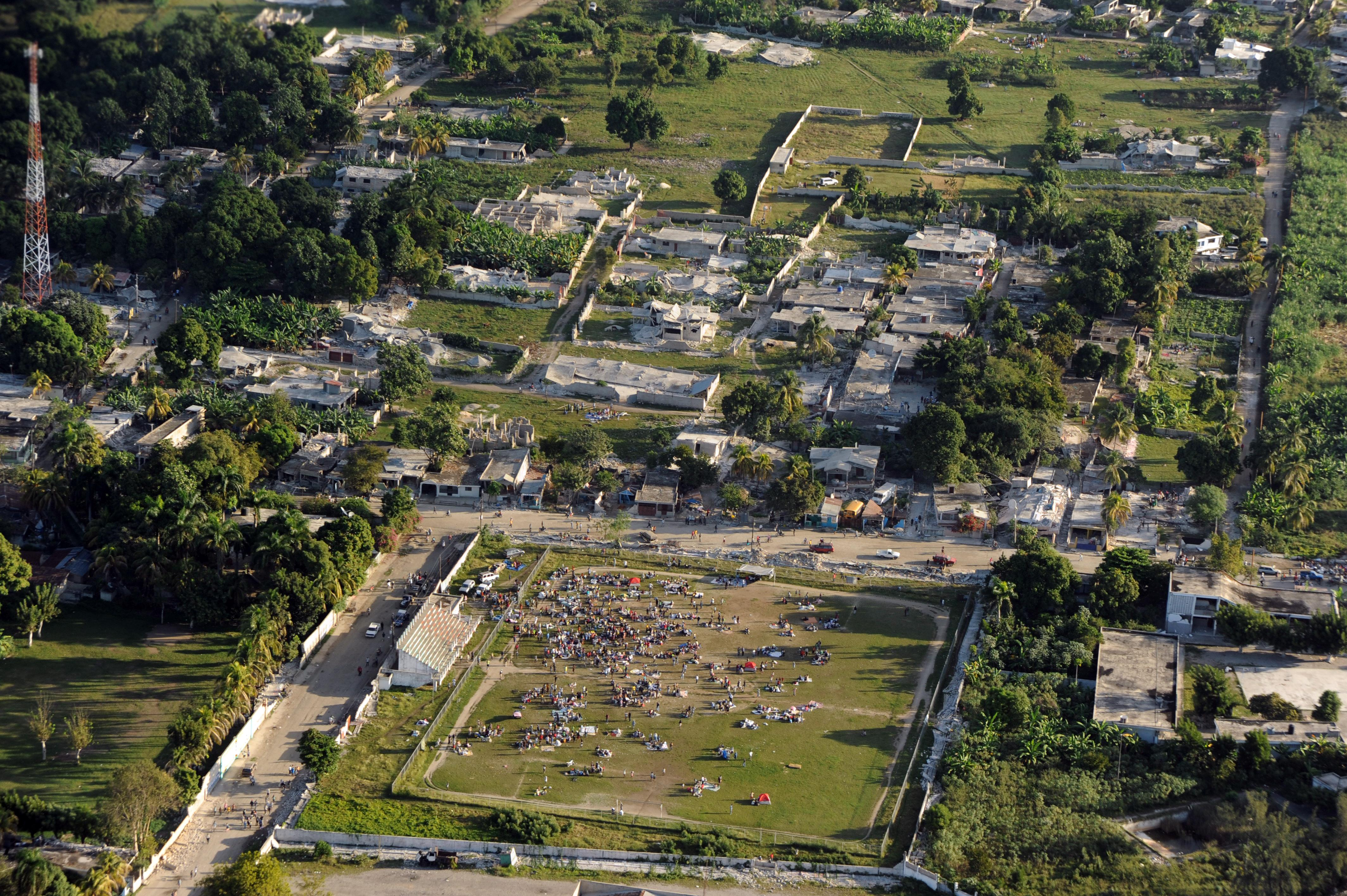
Léogâne, close to the earthquake epicenter

Most of Port-au-Prince's municipal buildings were destroyed or heavily damaged, including the City Hall, which was described by The Washington Post as, "a skeletal hulk of concrete and stucco, sagging grotesquely to the left." Port-au-Prince had no municipal petrol reserves and few city officials had working mobile phones before the earthquake, making communications and transportation very difficult.

Minister of Education Joel Jean-Pierre stated that the education system had "totally collapsed". About half the nation's schools and the three main universities in Port-au-Prince were affected. More than 1,300 schools and 50 health care facilities were destroyed.

The earthquake also destroyed a nursing school in the capital and severely damaged the country's primary midwifery school. The Haitian art world suffered great losses; artworks were destroyed, and museums and art galleries were extensively damaged, among them Port-au-Prince's main art museum, Centre d'Art school, College Saint Pierre and Holy Trinity Cathedral.

The headquarters of the United Nations Stabilization Mission in Haiti (MINUSTAH) at Christopher Hotel and offices of the World Bank were destroyed. The building housing the offices of Citibank in Port-au-Prince collapsed, killing five employees. The clothing industry, which accounts for two-thirds of Haiti's exports, reported structural damage at manufacturing facilities.

The quake created a landslide dam on the Rivière de Grand Goâve. As of February 2010 the water level was low, but engineer Yves Gattereau believed the dam could collapse during the rainy season, which would flood Grand-Goâve 12 km (7.5 mi) downstream.

== Conditions in the aftermath ==
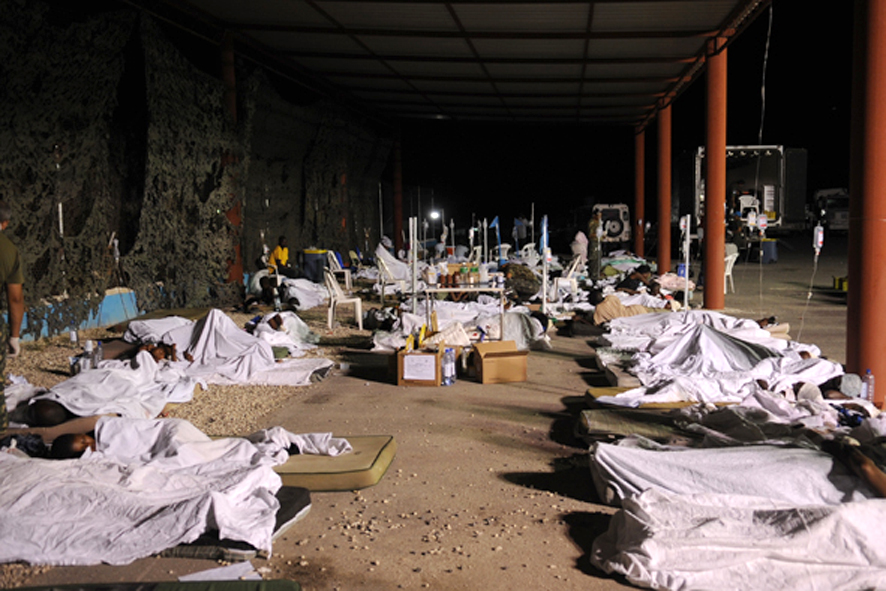
Assistance camp set up by the Brazilian Army

In the nights following the earthquake, many people in Haiti slept in the streets, on pavements, in their cars, or in makeshift shanty towns either because their houses had been destroyed, or they feared standing structures would not withstand aftershocks. Construction standards are low in Haiti; the country has no building codes. Engineers have stated that it is unlikely many buildings would have stood through any kind of disaster. Structures are often raised wherever they can fit; some buildings were built on slopes with insufficient foundations or steel supports. A representative of Catholic Relief Services has estimated that about two million Haitians lived as squatters on land they did not own. The country also suffered from shortages of fuel and potable water even before the disaster.

President Préval and government ministers used police headquarters near the Toussaint L'Ouverture International Airport as their new base of operations, although their effectiveness was extremely limited; several parliamentarians were still trapped in the Presidential Palace, and offices and records had been destroyed. Some high-ranking government workers lost family members, or had to tend to wounded relatives. Although the president and his remaining cabinet met with UN planners each day, there remained confusion as to who was in charge and no single group had organized relief efforts as of 16 January. The government handed over control of the airport to the United States to hasten and ease flight operations, which had been hampered by the damage to the air traffic control tower.

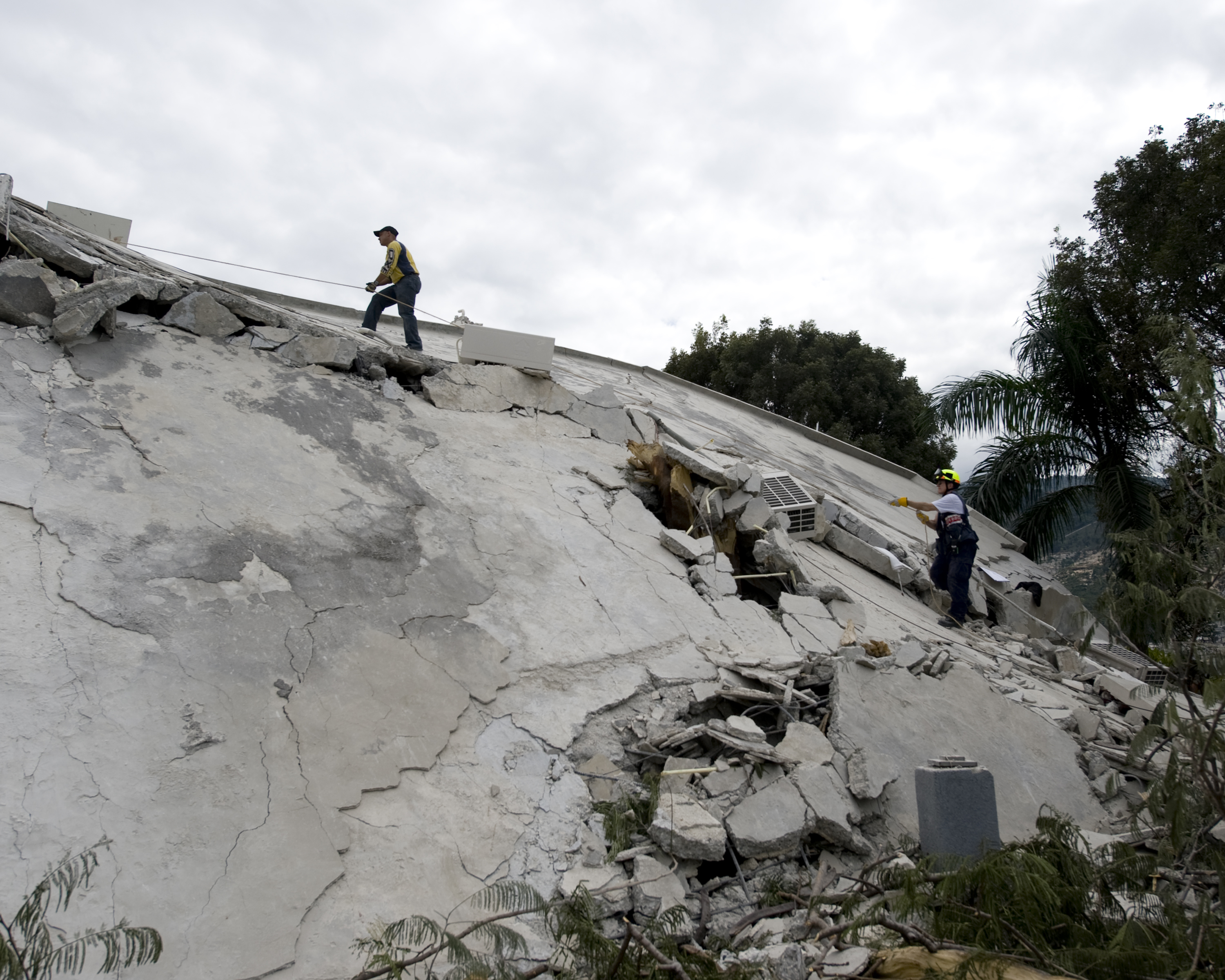
Urban Search and Rescue specialists work at the Hôtel Montana.

Almost immediately Port-au-Prince's morgue facilities were overwhelmed. By 14 January, a thousand bodies had been placed on the streets and pavements. Government crews collected thousands more by truck, burying them in mass graves. In the heat and humidity, corpses buried in rubble began to decompose and smell. Mati Goldstein, head of the Israeli ZAKA International Rescue Unit delegation to Haiti, described the situation as "Shabbat from hell. Everywhere, the acrid smell of bodies hangs in the air. It's just like the stories we are told of the Holocaust – thousands of bodies everywhere. You have to understand that the situation is true madness, and the more time passes, there are more and more bodies, in numbers that cannot be grasped. It is beyond comprehension."

Mayor Jean-Yves Jason said that officials argued for hours about what to do with the volume of corpses. The government buried many in mass graves, some above-ground tombs were forced open so bodies could be stacked inside, and others were burned. Mass graves were dug in a large field outside the settlement of Titanyen, north of the capital; tens of thousands of bodies were reported as having been brought to the site by dump truck and buried in trenches dug by earth movers. Max Beauvoir, a Vodou priest, protested the lack of dignity in mass burials, stating, "... it is not in our culture to bury people in such a fashion, it is desecration".

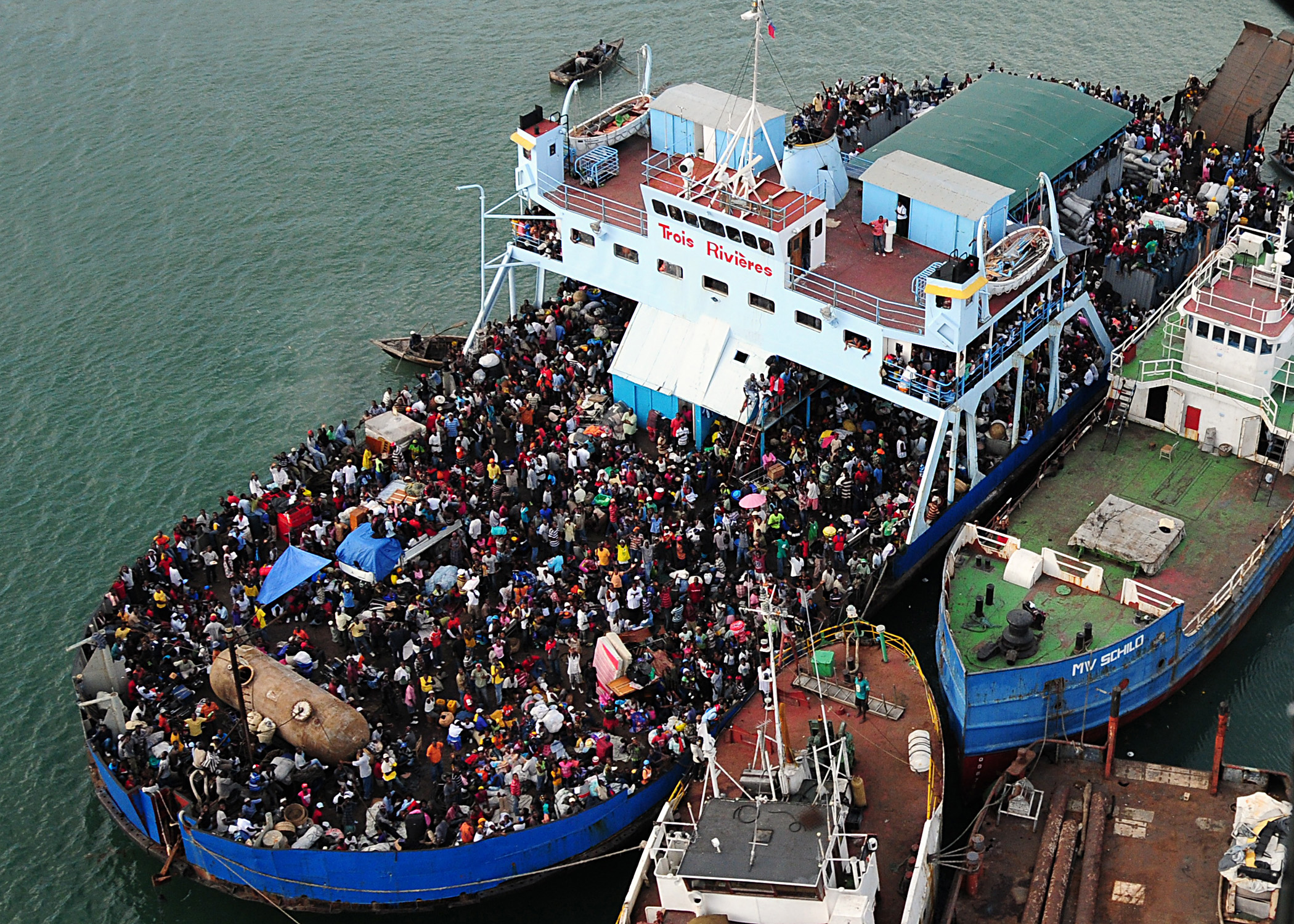
The Haitian government began a programme to move homeless people out of Port-au-Prince on a ferry to Port Jeremie and in hired buses to temporary camps.

Towns in the eastern Dominican Republic began preparing for tens of thousands of refugees, and by 16 January hospitals close to the border had been filled to capacity with Haitians. Some began reporting having expended stocks of critical medical supplies such as antibiotics by 17 January. The border was reinforced by Dominican soldiers, and the government of the Dominican Republic asserted that all Haitians who crossed the border for medical assistance would be allowed to stay only temporarily. A local governor stated, "We have a great desire and we will do everything humanly possible to help Haitian families. But we have our limitations with respect to food and medicine. We need the helping hand of other countries in the area."

Slow distribution of resources in the days after the earthquake resulted in sporadic violence, with looting reported. There were also accounts of looters wounded or killed by vigilantes and neighbourhoods that had constructed their own roadblock barricades. Dr Evan Lyon of Partners in Health, working at the General Hospital in Port-au-Prince, claimed that misinformation and overblown reports of violence had hampered the delivery of aid and medical services.

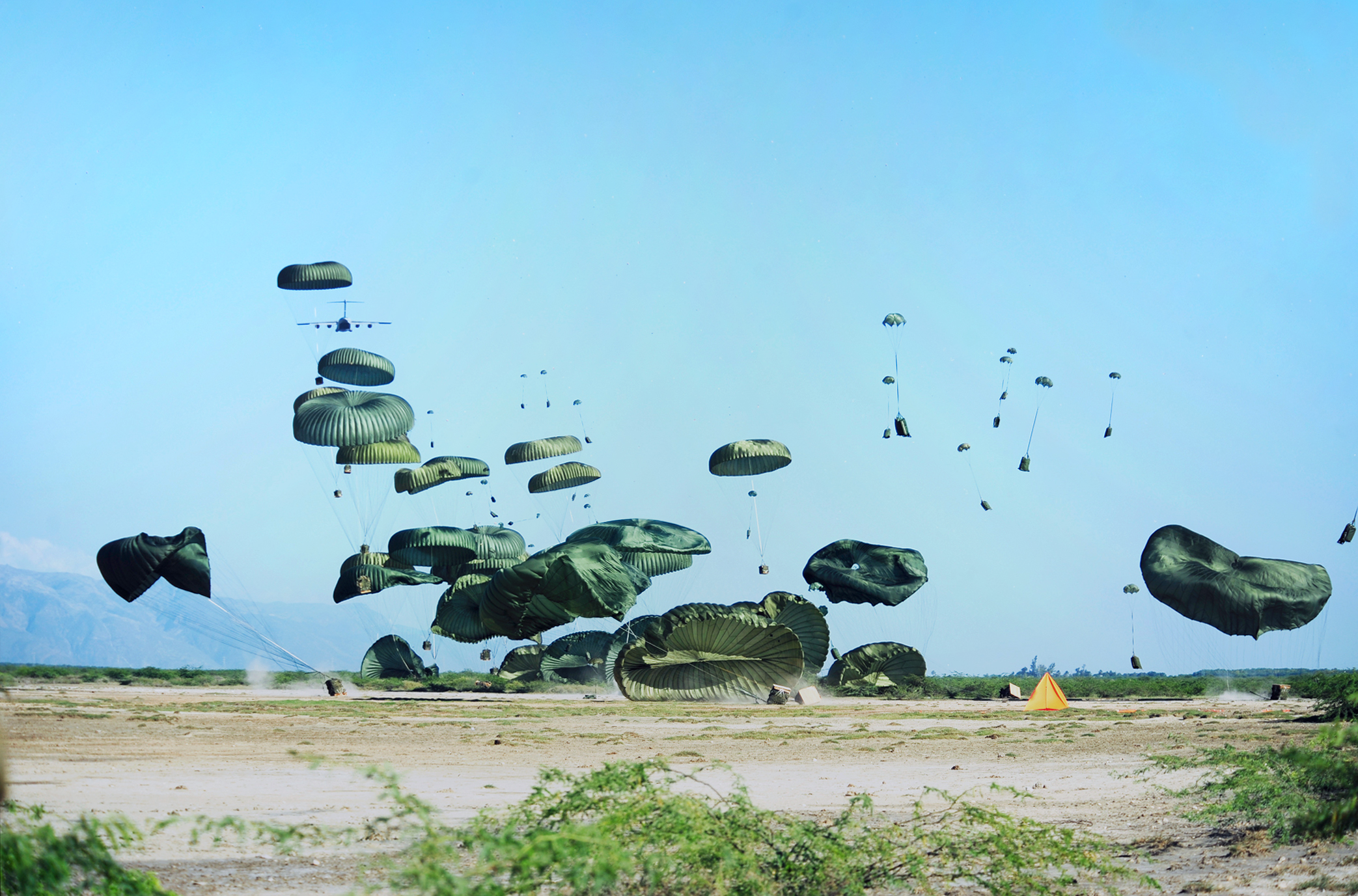
One of the first parachute air drops after the quake, 18 January

Former US president Bill Clinton acknowledged the problems and said Americans should "not be deterred from supporting the relief effort" by upsetting scenes such as those of looting. Lt. Gen. P.K. Keen, deputy commander of US Southern Command, however, announced that despite the stories of looting and violence, there was less violent crime in Port-au-Prince after the earthquake than before.

In many neighbourhoods, singing could be heard through the night and groups of men coordinated to act as security as groups of women attempted to take care of food and hygiene necessities. During the days following the earthquake, hundreds were seen marching through the streets in peaceful processions, singing and clapping.

The earthquake caused an urgent need for outside rescuers to communicate with Haitians whose main or only language is Haitian Creole. As a result, a mobile translation program to translate between English and Haitian Creole had to be written quickly.

The generation of waste from relief operations was referred to as a "second disaster". The United States military reported that millions of water bottles and styrofoam food packages were distributed although there was no operational waste management system. Over 700,000 plastic tarpaulins and 100,000 tents were required for emergency shelters. The increase in plastic waste, combined with poor disposal practices, resulted in open drainage channels being blocked, increasing the risk of disease.

== Casualties ==
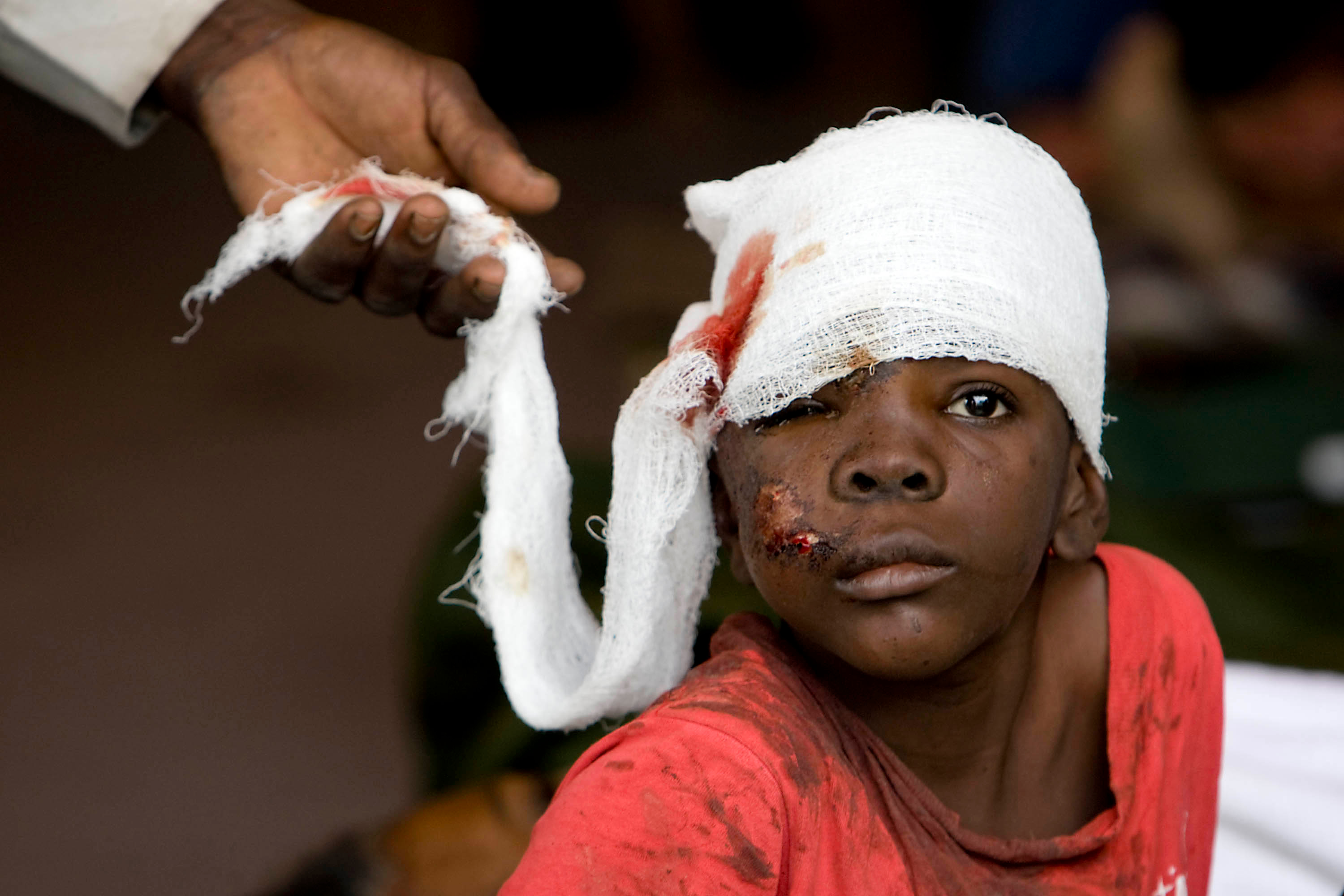
A Haitian boy receives treatment at a MINUSTAH logistics base.

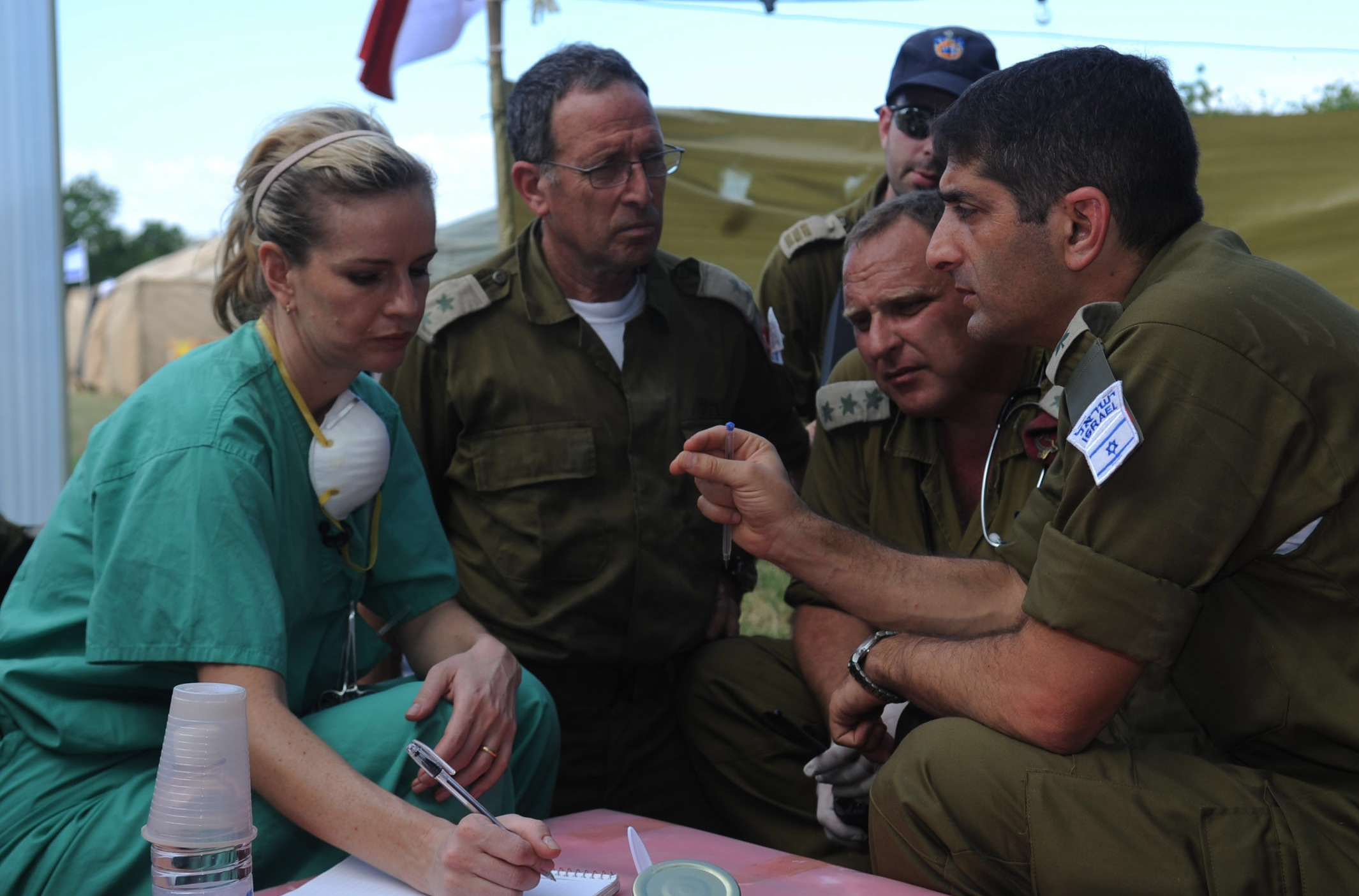
Israeli and U.S. medical personnel coordinate relief efforts.

The earthquake struck in the most populated area of the country. The International Federation of Red Cross and Red Crescent Societies estimated that as many as 3 million people had been affected by the quake. In mid February 2010, the Haitian government reported the death toll to have reached 230,000. A report from the Inter-American Development Bank in February 2010 gave a range of 200,000 to 250,000 dead, stating that it was "the most destructive event a country has ever experienced when measured in terms of the number of people killed as a share of the country's population". However, an investigation by Radio Netherlands has questioned the official death toll, reporting an estimate of 92,000 deaths as being a more realistic figure. On the first anniversary of the earthquake, 12 January 2011, Haitian Prime Minister Jean-Max Bellerive said the death toll from the quake was more than 316,000, raising the figures from previous estimates.

Several experts have questioned the validity of the death toll numbers; Anthony Penna, professor emeritus in environmental history at Northeastern University, warned that casualty estimates could only be a "guesstimate", and Belgian disaster response expert Claude de Ville de Goyet noted that "round numbers are a sure sign that nobody knows." Edmond Mulet, UN Assistant Secretary-General for Peacekeeping Operations, said, "I do not think we will ever know what the death toll is from this earthquake", while the director of the Haitian Red Cross, Jean-Pierre Guiteau, noted that his organization had not had the time to count bodies, as their focus had been on the treatment of survivors.

While the vast majority of casualties were Haitian civilians, the dead included aid workers, embassy staff, foreign tourists—and a number of public figures, including Archbishop of Port-au-Prince Monsignor Joseph Serge Miot, aid worker Zilda Arns and officials in the Haitian government, including opposition leader Michel "Micha" Gaillard. Also killed were a number of well-known Haitian musicians and sports figures, including thirty members of the Fédération Haïtienne de Football. At least 85 United Nations personnel working with MINUSTAH were killed, among them the Mission Chief, Hédi Annabi, his deputy, Luiz Carlos da Costa, and police commissioner Douglas Coates. Around 200 guests were killed in the collapse of the Hôtel Montana in Port-au-Prince.

On 31 May 2011, an unreleased draft report based on a survey commissioned by the US Agency for International Development (USAID) challenged the Haiti earthquake death toll and several damage estimates. The unpublished report put the death toll between 46,000 and 85,000 and put the number of displaced persons at 895,000, of which only 375,000 remained in temporary shelters. The unreleased report, which compiled its figures from a door-to-door survey, was done by a Washington consulting firm, LTL Strategies. A US State Department spokesperson said the report had inconsistencies and would not be released until they were resolved. As of January 2012, USAID has not released the report and states on its website that 1.5 million people were displaced, of which 550,000 remain without permanent shelter. The most reliable academic estimate of the number of earthquake casualties in Haiti (over 95% were in the immediate Port-au-Prince area) "within six weeks of the earthquake" appears to be the 160,000 estimate in a 2010 University of Michigan study. A 2013 preprint study placed the death toll at around 137,000.

== Early response ==
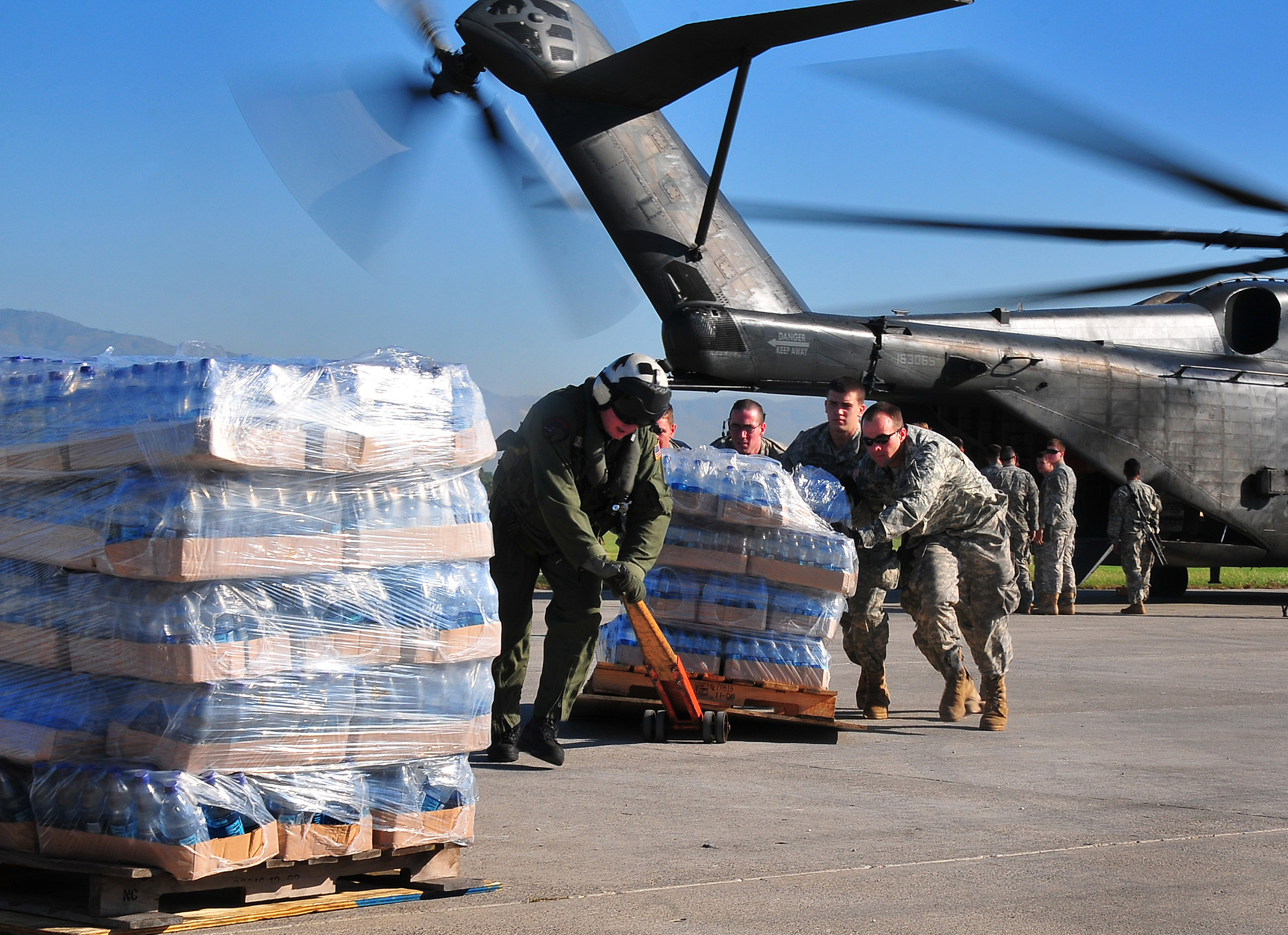
Heavy-lift helicopters ferry water from the offshore flotilla, 15 January.

Appeals for humanitarian aid were issued by many aid organizations, the United Nations and president René Préval. Raymond Joseph, Haiti's ambassador to the United States, and his nephew, singer Wyclef Jean, who was called upon by Préval to become a "roving ambassador" for Haiti, also pleaded for aid and donations. Images and testimonials circulating after the earthquake across the internet and through social media helped to intensify the reaction of global engagement.

Many countries responded to the appeals and launched fund-raising efforts, as well as sending search and rescue teams. The neighbouring Dominican Republic was the first country to give aid to Haiti, sending water, food and heavy-lifting machinery. The hospitals in the Dominican Republic were made available; a combined effort of the Airports Department (DA), together with the Dominican Naval Auxiliaries, the UN and other parties formed the Dominican-Haitian Aerial Support Bridge, making the main Dominican airports available for support operations to Haiti. The Dominican website FlyDominicanRepublic.com made available to the internet, daily updates on airport information and news from the operations center on the Dominican side. The Dominican emergency team assisted more than 2,000 injured people, while the Dominican Institute of Telecommunications (Indotel) helped with the restoration of some telephone services. The Dominican Red Cross coordinated early medical relief in conjunction with the International Red Cross. The government sent eight mobile medical units along with 36 doctors including orthopaedic specialists, traumatologists, anaesthetists, and surgeons. In addition, 39 trucks carrying canned food were dispatched, along with 10 mobile kitchens and 110 cooks capable of producing 100,000 meals per day.

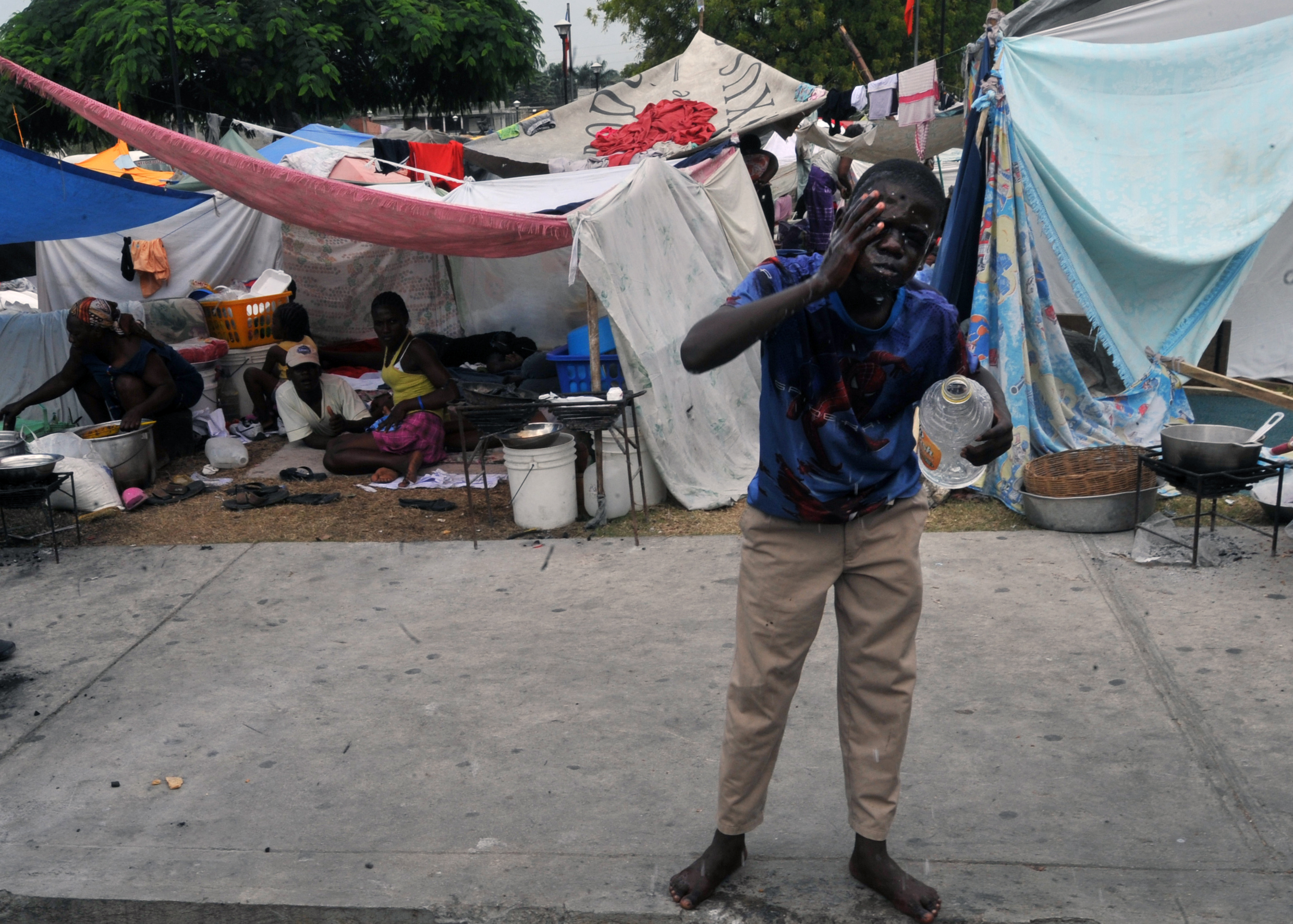
Having lost their homes, many Haitians moved to live in precarious camps.

Other nations from farther afield also sent personnel, medicines, materiel, and other aid to Haiti. The first team to arrive in Port-au-Prince was ICE-SAR from Iceland, landing within 24 hours of the earthquake. A 50-member Chinese team arrived early Thursday morning. From the Middle East, the government of Qatar sent a strategic transport aircraft (C-17), loaded with 50 tonnes of urgent relief materials and 26 members from the Qatari armed forces, the internal security force (Lekhwiya), police force and the Hamad Medical Corporation, to set up a field hospital and provide assistance in Port-au-Prince and other affected areas in Haiti. A rescue team sent by the Israel Defense Forces' Home Front Command established a field hospital near the United Nations building in Port-au-Prince with specialised facilities to treat children, the elderly, and women in labor. It was set up in eight hours and began operations on the evening of 16 January. A Korean International Disaster Relief Team of 40 rescuers, medical doctors, nurses and two police dogs was deployed to epicenters to assist mitigation efforts of Haitian Government.

The American Red Cross announced on 13 January that it had run out of supplies in Haiti and appealed for public donations. Giving Children Hope worked to get much-needed medicines and supplies on the ground. Partners in Health (PIH), the largest health care provider in rural Haiti, was able to provide some emergency care from its ten hospitals and clinics, all of which were outside the capital and undamaged. MINUSTAH had over 9,000 uniformed peacekeepers deployed to the area. Most of these workers were initially involved in the search for survivors at the organization's collapsed headquarters.

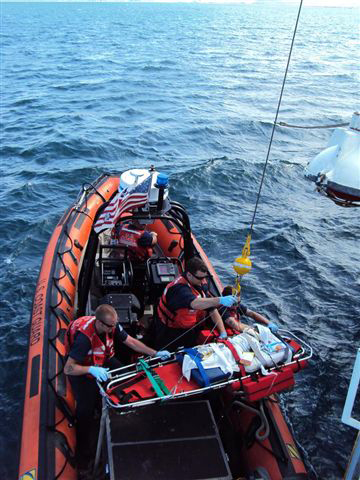
Haitian survivors were transferred to rescue ships for medical aid.

The International Charter on Space and Major Disasters was activated, allowing satellite imagery of affected regions to be shared with rescue and aid organizations. Members of social networking sites such as Twitter and Facebook spread messages and pleas to send help. Facebook was overwhelmed by—and blocked—some users who were sending messages about updates. The American Red Cross set a record for mobile donations, raising US$7 million in 24 hours when they allowed people to send US$10 donations by text messages. The OpenStreetMap community responded to the disaster by greatly improving the level of mapping available for the area using post-earthquake satellite photography provided by GeoEye, and crowdmapping website Ushahidi coordinated messages from multiple sites to assist Haitians still trapped and to keep families of survivors informed. Some online poker sites hosted poker tournaments with tournament fees, prizes or both going to disaster relief charities. Google Earth updated its coverage of Port-au-Prince on 17 January, showing the earthquake-ravaged city.

Easing refugee immigration into Canada was discussed by Canadian Prime Minister Stephen Harper, and in the US Haitians were granted Temporary protected status, a measure that permits about 100,000 undocumented Haitians in the United States to stay legally for 18 months, and halts the deportations of 30,000 more, though it does not apply to Haitians outside the US. Local and state agencies in South Florida, together with the US government, began implementing a plan ("Operation Vigilant Sentry") for a mass migration from the Caribbean that had been laid out in 2003.

Several orphanages were destroyed in the earthquake. After the process for the adoption of 400 children by families in the US and the Netherlands was expedited, Unicef and SOS Children urged an immediate halt to adoptions from Haiti. Jasmine Whitbread, chief executive of Save the Children said: "The vast majority of the children currently on their own still have family members alive who will be desperate to be reunited with them and will be able to care for them with the right support. Taking children out of the country would permanently separate thousands of children from their families—a separation that would compound the acute trauma they are already suffering and inflict long-term damage on their chances of recovery." However, several organizations were planning an airlift of thousands of orphaned children to South Florida on humanitarian visas, modelled on a similar effort with Cuban refugees in the 1960s named "Pedro Pan". On 29 January 2010, a group of ten American Baptist missionaries from Idaho attempted to cross the Haiti-Dominican Republic border with 33 Haitian children. The group, known as the New Life Children's Refuge, did not have proper authorization for transporting the children and were arrested on kidnapping charges. The Canadian government worked to expedite around 100 adoption cases that were already underway when the earthquake struck, issuing temporary permits and waiving regular processing fees; the federal government also announced that it would cover adopted children's healthcare costs upon their arrival in Canada until they could be covered under provincially administered public healthcare plans.

== Rescue and relief efforts ==
Rescue efforts began in the immediate aftermath of the earthquake, with able-bodied survivors extricating the living and the dead from the rubble of the many buildings that had collapsed. Treatment of the injured was hampered by the lack of hospital and morgue facilities: the Argentine military field hospital, which had been serving MINUSTAH, was the only one available until 13 January. Rescue work intensified only slightly with the arrival of doctors, police officers, military personnel and firefighters from various countries two days after the earthquake.

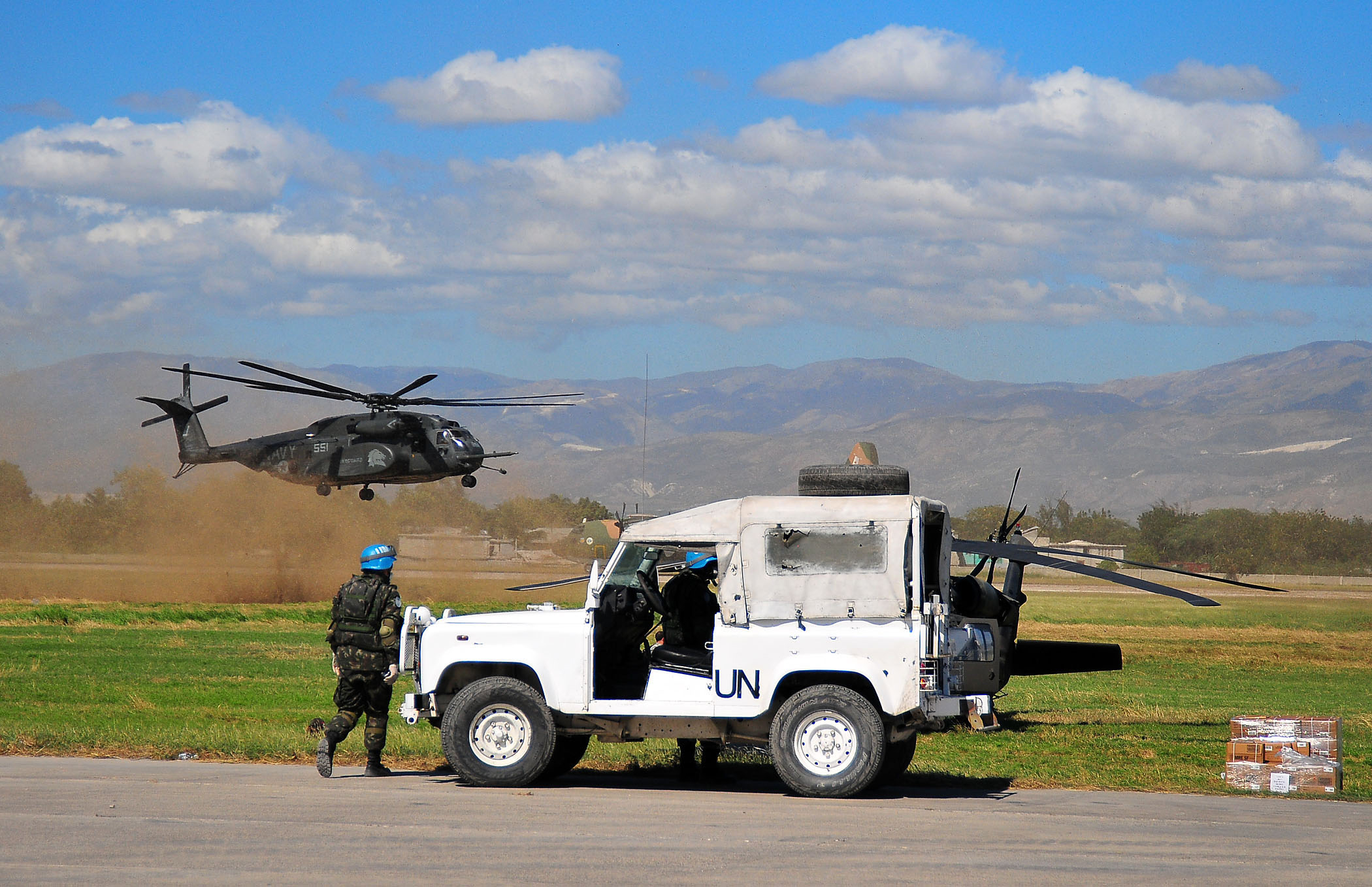
MINUSTAH troops meet a U.S. relief flight on 16 January.

From 12 January, the International Committee of the Red Cross, which has been working in Haiti since 1994, focused on bringing emergency assistance to victims of the catastrophe. It worked with its partners within the International Red Cross and Red Crescent Movement, particularly the Haitian Red Cross and the International Federation of Red Cross and Red Crescent Societies. The American Red Cross also spearheaded a mobile donation initiative with Mobile Accord to raise over $2 million within the first 24 hours after the earthquake.

Médecins Sans Frontières (Doctors Without Borders; MSF) reported that the hospitals that had not been destroyed were overwhelmed by large numbers of seriously injured people. The hospitals had to perform many amputations. Running short of medical supplies, some teams had to work with any available resources, constructing splints out of cardboard and reusing latex gloves. Other rescue units had to withdraw as night fell, amid security fears. Over 3,000 people had been treated by Médecins Sans Frontières as of 18 January. Ophelia Dahl, director of Partners in Health, reported, "there are hundreds of thousands of injured people. I have heard the estimate that as many as 20,000 people will die each day that would have been saved by surgery."

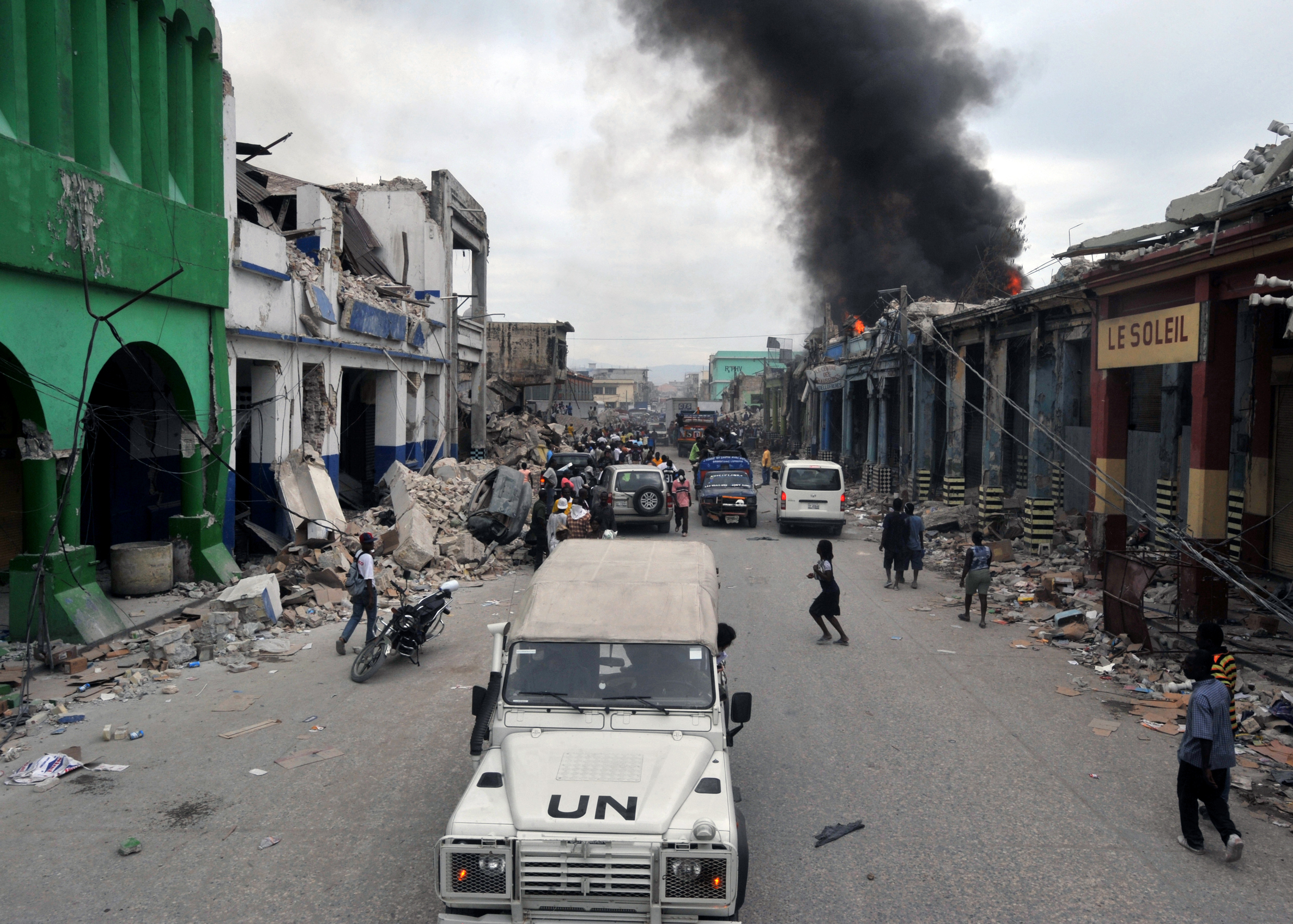
UN forces took to patrolling the streets of Port-au-Prince.

An MSF aircraft carrying a field hospital was repeatedly turned away by US air traffic controllers, who had assumed control at Toussaint L'Ouverture International Airport. Four other MSF aircraft were also turned away. In a 19 January press release MSF said, "It is like working in a war situation. We don't have any more morphine to manage pain for our patients. We cannot accept that planes carrying lifesaving medical supplies and equipment continue to be turned away while our patients die. Priority must be given to medical supplies entering the country." First responders voiced frustration with the number of relief trucks sitting unused at the airport. Aid workers blamed US-controlled airport operations for prioritising the transportation of security troops over rescuers and supplies; evacuation policies favouring citizens of certain nations were also criticised.

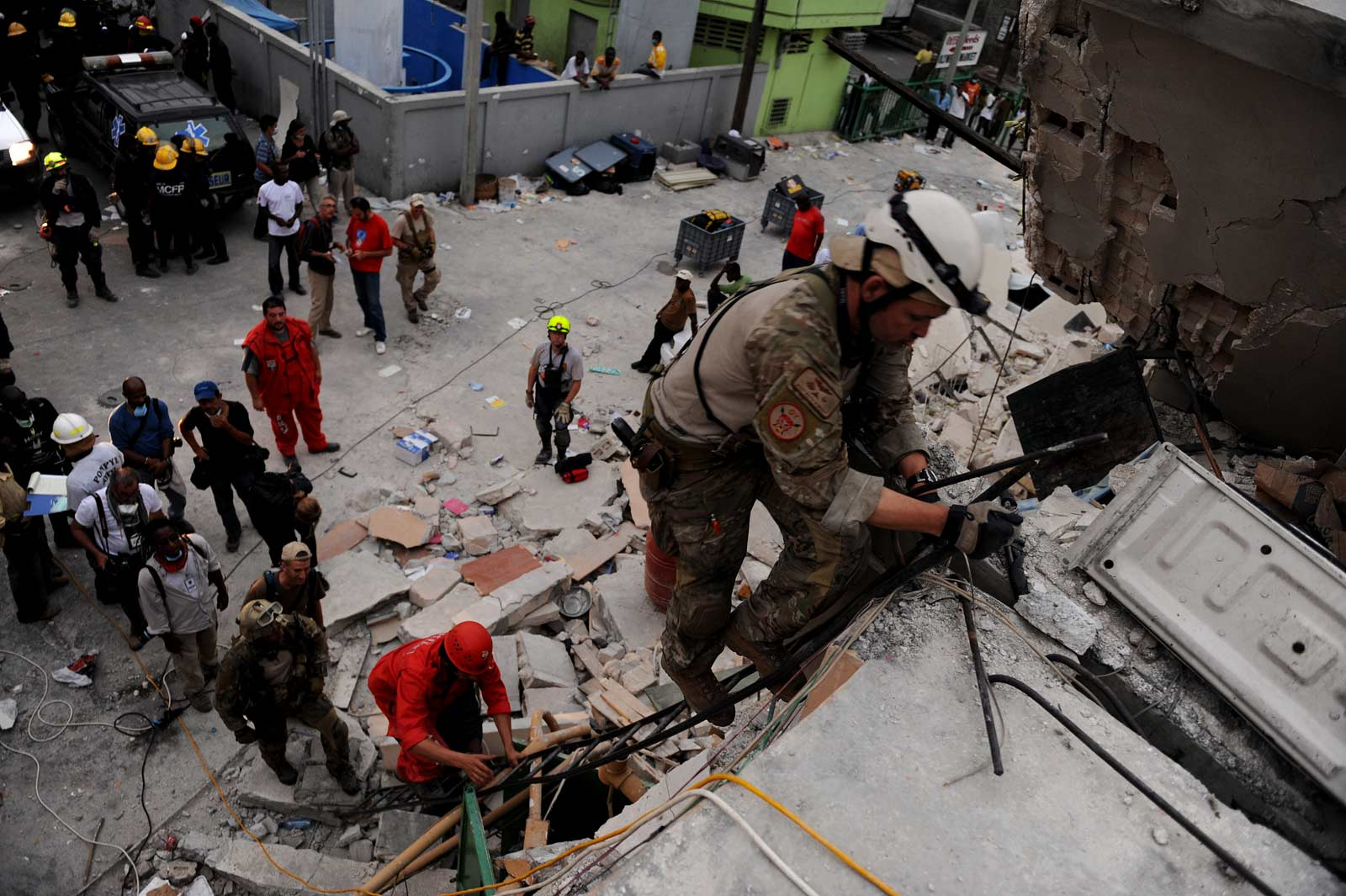
A USAF pararescueman searching through demolished buildings in Port-au-Prince for survivors

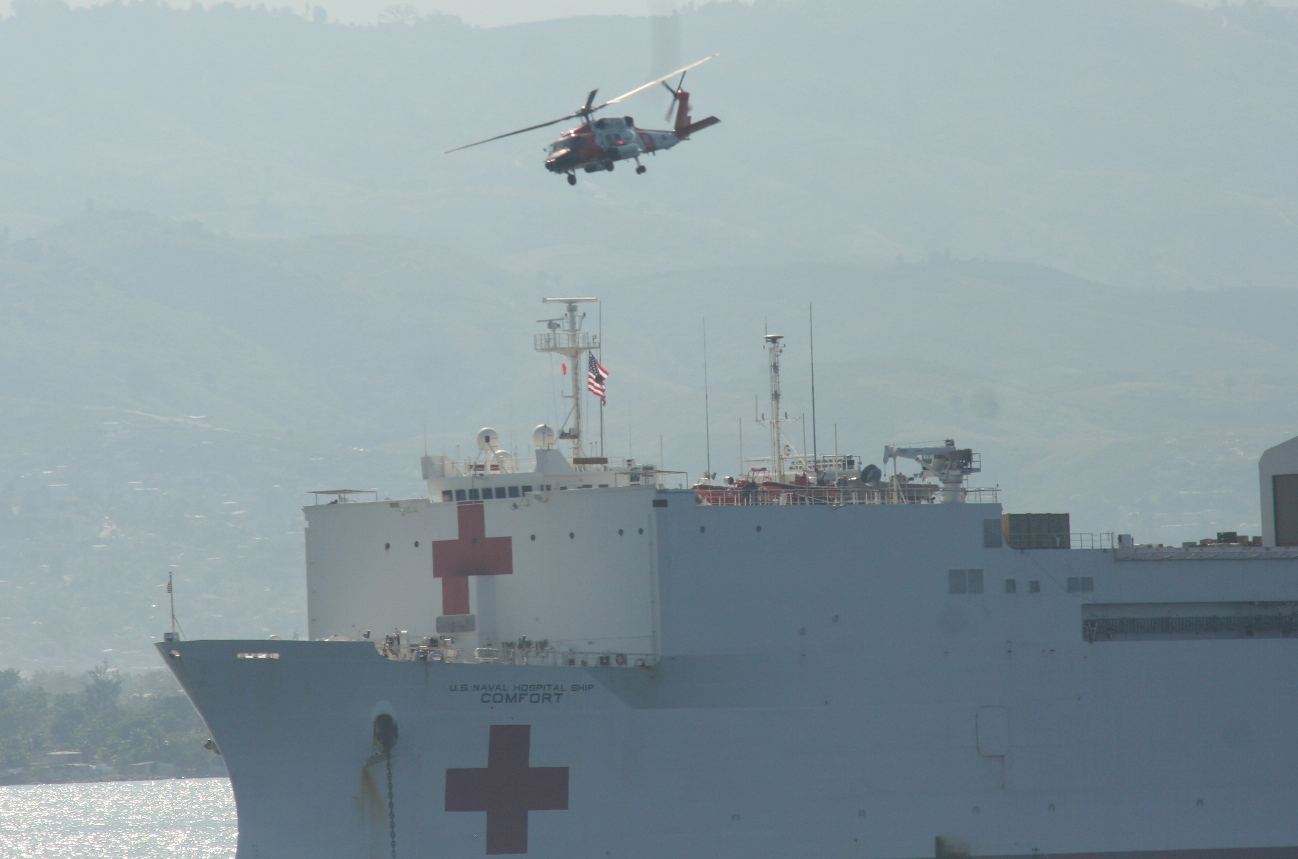
Helicopters transfer injured earthquake victims to hospital ship USNS Comfort off the coast of Haiti.

The US military acknowledged the non-governmental organizations' complaints concerning flight-operations bias and promised improvement while noting that up to 17 January 600 emergency flights had landed and 50 were diverted; by the first weekend of disaster operations, diversions had been reduced to three on Saturday and two on Sunday. The airport staff was strengthened in order to support 100 landings a day, compared to the 35 a day that the airport gets during normal operation. A spokesman for the joint task force running the airport confirmed that, though more flights were requesting landing slots, none was being turned away.

Brazilian Foreign Minister Celso Amorim and French Minister of State for Cooperation Alain Joyandet criticised the perceived preferential treatment for US aid arriving at the airport. A spokesman for the French Ministry of Foreign Affairs said that the French government had not protested officially with regard to the management of the airport. US officials acknowledged that coordination of the relief effort is central to Haitian recovery. President Préval asked for calm coordination between assisting nations without mutual accusations.

Based on US Air Force logs documenting activity at the airport, the Associated Press largely disproved the claim that the US held up aid in favor of military flights. The US military initially gave priority to military units in order to secure the airport, distribute aid, and provide security, but after that, incoming relief flights were cleared or rejected on a first-come, first-served basis. According to a US Air Force captain who had coordinated flight schedules, nearly all groups sending aid insisted their shipment was urgent. Those flights that were rejected were diverted to the Dominican Republic, and their cargoes were unloaded and taken to Haiti by land.

At the peak of the relief efforts, the airport was in a state of chaos. Normally, the airport, with a single runway and 10 spaces for large planes, handled 20 flights a day. After the earthquake struck, hundreds of planes rushed to Haiti without designated landing times. On average, a plane would land or take off every two minutes. The situation was complicated by the lack of room on ramps for planes to unload their cargo, and some planes did not have enough fuel to leave.

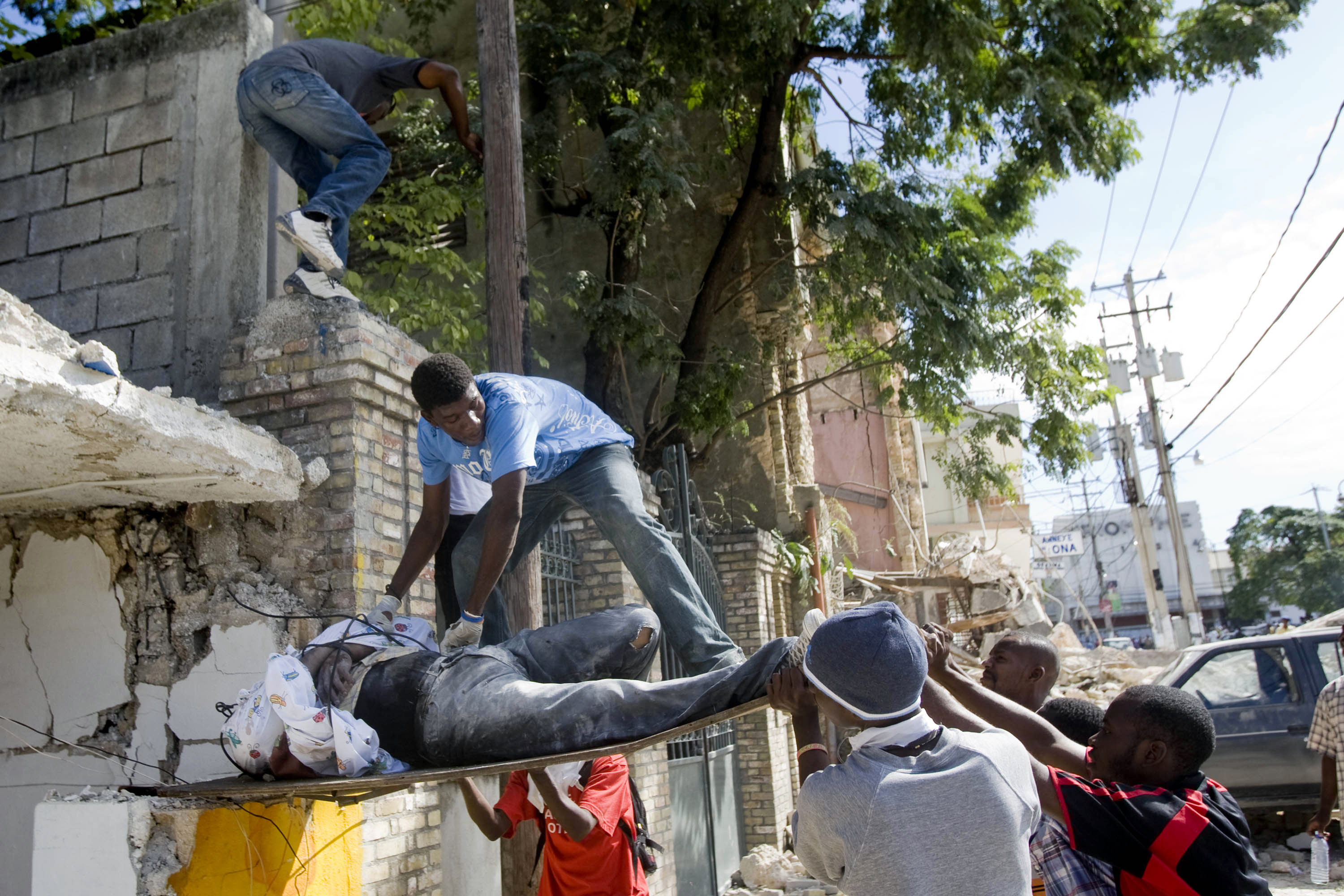
While international efforts received significant media coverage, much of the local rescue effort was conducted by Haitians.

While the Port-au-Prince airport ramp has spaces for more than a dozen airliners, in the days following the quake, it sometimes served nearly 40 at once, creating serious delays. The supply backup at the airport was expected to ease as the apron management improved, and when the perceived need for heavy security diminished. Airport congestion was reduced on 18 January when the United Nations and US forces formally agreed to prioritise humanitarian flights over security reinforcement.

By 14 January, more than 20 countries had sent military personnel to the country, with Canada, the United States, and the Dominican Republic providing the largest contingents. The supercarrier USS Carl Vinson arrived at maximum possible speed on 15 January with 600,000 emergency food rations, 100,000 ten-litre water containers, and an enhanced wing of 19 helicopters; 130,000 litres of drinking water were transferred to shore on the first day.

The helicopter carrier USS Bataan sailed with three large dock landing ships and two survey/salvage vessels, to create a "sea base" for the rescue effort. They were joined by the French Navy vessel Francis Garnier on 16 January, the same day the hospital ship USNS Comfort and guided-missile cruiser USS Bunker Hill left for Haiti. Another large French vessel was later ordered to Haiti, the amphibious transport dock Siroco.

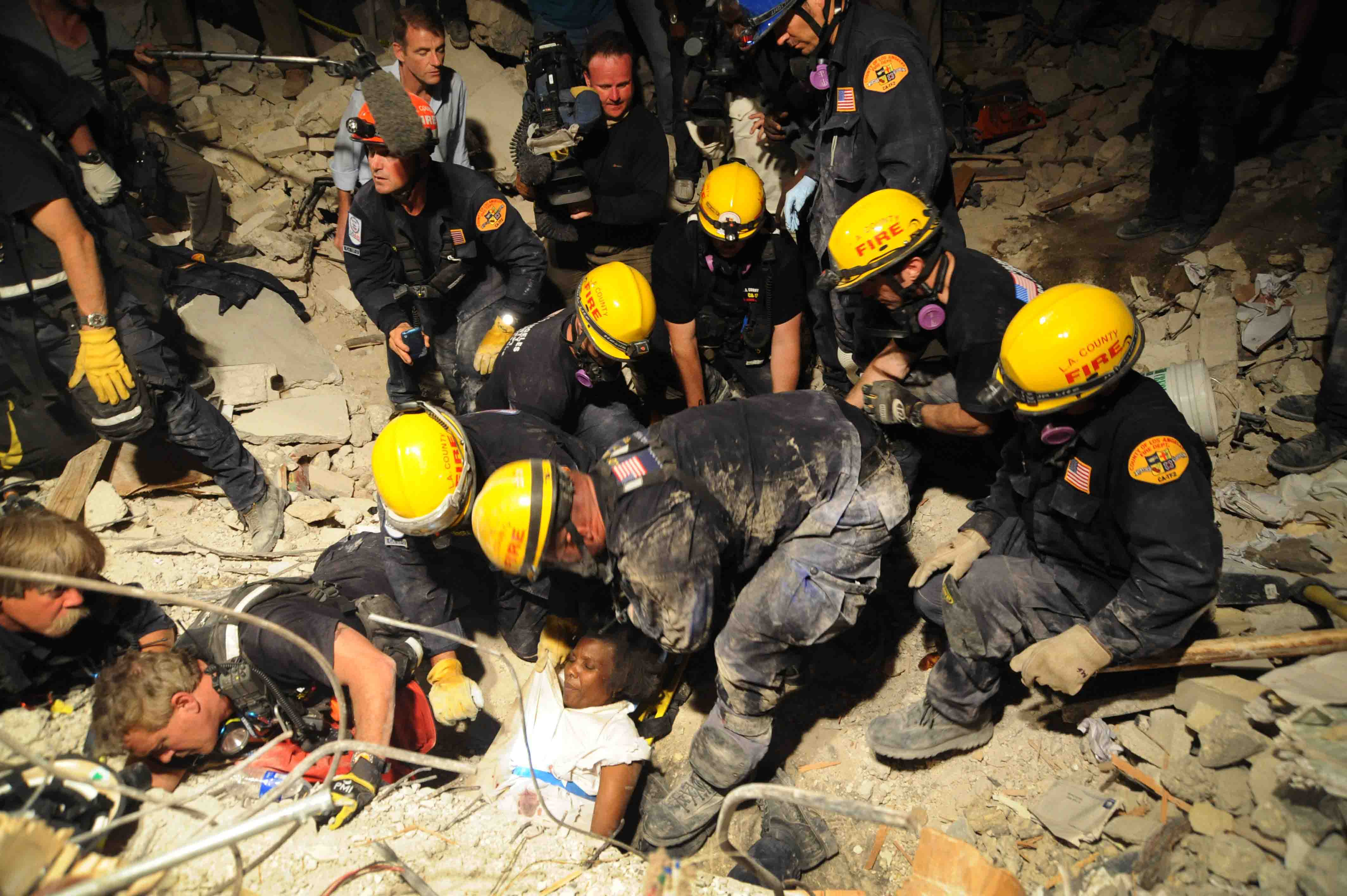
A woman is rescued alive from rubble several days after the initial quake.

International rescue efforts were restricted by traffic congestion and blocked roads. Although US Secretary of Defense Robert Gates had previously ruled out dropping food and water by air as too dangerous, by 16 January, US helicopters were distributing aid by drops to areas impossible to reach by land.

In Jacmel, a city of 50,000, the mayor claimed that 70 percent of the homes had been damaged and that the quake had killed 300 to 500 people and left some 4,000 injured. The small airstrip suffered damage rendering it unusable for supply flights until 20 January. The Canadian navy vessel HMCS Halifax was deployed to the area on 18 January; the Canadians joined Colombian rescue workers, Chilean doctors, a French mobile clinic, and Sri Lankan relief workers who had already responded to calls for aid.

About 64,000 people living in the three adjacent agricultural communities of Durissy, Morne a Chandelle, and Les Palmes were relatively unharmed because most of the people were working in the fields when the quakes struck. All their churches, chapels, and at least 8,000 homes were destroyed.

On 17 January 2010, British search and rescue teams were the first to reach Léogane, the town at the epicenter of the quake. The Canadian ship HMCS Athabaskan reached the area on 19 January, and by 20 January some 250–300 Canadian personnel were assisting relief efforts in the town. By 19 January, staff of the International Red Cross had also managed to reach the town, which they described as "severely damaged ... the people there urgently need assistance." By 20 January they had reached Petit-Goâve as well, where they set up two first-aid posts and distributed first-aid kits.

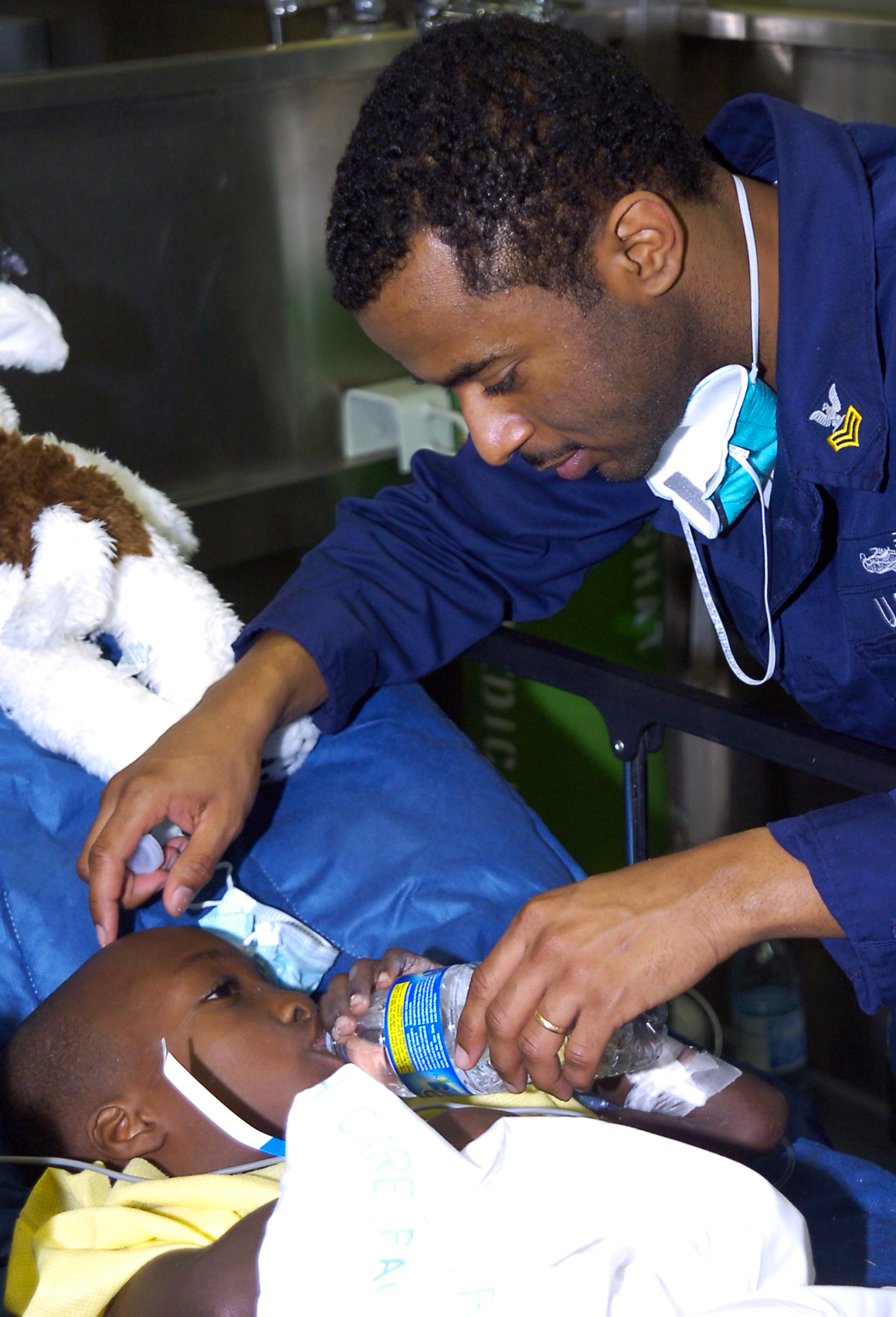
A Haitian child is treated aboard a hospital ship.

Over the first weekend 130,000 food packets and 70,000 water containers were distributed to Haitians, as safe landing areas and distribution centers such as golf courses were secured. Nearly 2,000 rescuers had arrived from 43 different groups, with 161 search dogs; the airport had handled 250 tons of relief supplies by the end of the weekend. Reports from Sunday showed a record-breaking number of successful rescues, with at least 12 survivors pulled from Port-au-Prince's rubble, bringing the total number of rescues to 110.

The buoy tender USCG Oak and USNS Grasp (T-ARS-51) were on scene by 18 January to assess damage to the port and work to reopen it, and by 21 January one pier at the Port-au-Prince seaport was functional, offloading humanitarian aid, and a road had been repaired to make transport into the city easier. In an interview on 21 January, Leo Merores, Haiti's ambassador to the UN, said that he expected the port to be fully functional again within two weeks.

The US Navy listed its resources in the area as "17 ships, 48 helicopters and 12 fixed-wing aircraft" in addition to 10,000 sailors and Marines. The Navy had conducted 336 air deliveries, delivered 32,400 US gallons (123,000 L) of water, 532,440 bottles of water, 111,082 meals and 9,000 lb (4,100 kg) of medical supplies by 20 January. Hospital ship Comfort began operations on 20 January, completing the arrival of the first group of sea-base vessels; this came as a new flotilla of USN ships were assigned to Haiti, including survey vessels, ferries, elements of the maritime prepositioning and underway replenishment fleets, and a further three amphibious operations ships, including another helicopter carrier, USS Nassau (LHA-4).

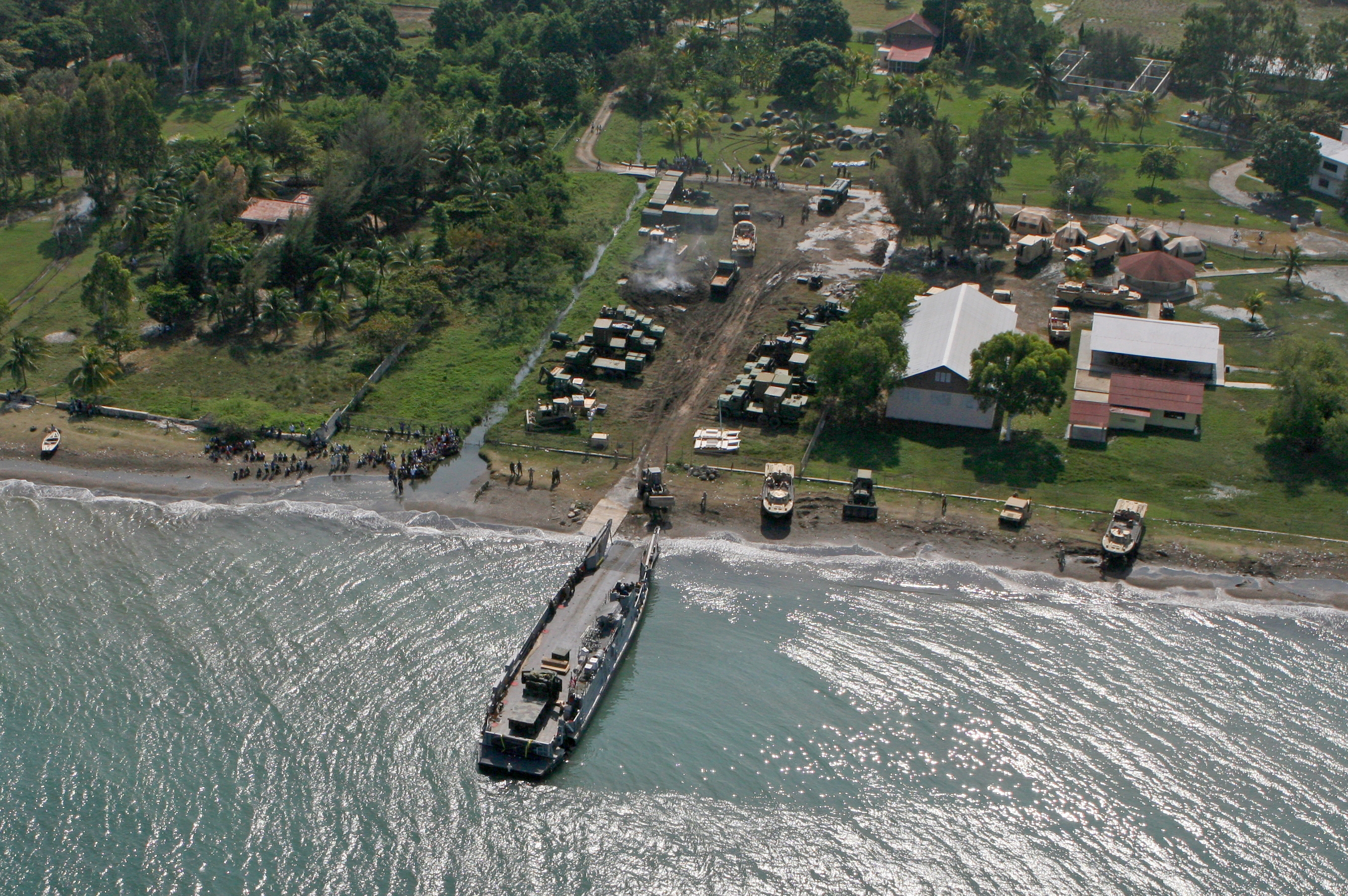
Landing ships move supplies onshore from the rescue fleet.

On 22 January the UN and United States formalised the coordination of relief efforts by signing an agreement giving the US responsibility for the ports, airports and roads, and making the UN and Haitian authorities responsible for law and order. The UN stated that it had resisted formalising the organization of the relief effort to allow as much leeway as possible for those wishing to assist in the relief effort, but with the new agreement "we're leaving that emergency phase behind". The UN also urged organizations to coordinate aid efforts through its mission in Haiti to allow for better scheduling of the arrival of supplies. On 23 January the Haitian government officially called off the search for survivors, and most search and rescue teams began to prepare to leave the country. However, as late as 8 February 2010, survivors were still being discovered, as in the case of Evan Muncie, 28, found in the rubble of a grocery store.

On 5 February, ten Baptist missionaries from Idaho led by Laura Silsby were charged with criminal association and kidnapping for trying to smuggle 33 children out of Haiti. The missionaries claimed they were rescuing orphaned children but investigations revealed that more than 20 of the children had been taken from their parents after they were told the children would have a better life in America. In an interview, Kenneth Merten, the United States Ambassador to Haiti, stated that the US justice system would not interfere and that "the Haitian justice system will do what it has to do." By 9 March 2010, all but Silsby were deported and she remained incarcerated.

Social networking organizations such as Crisis Camp Haiti were developed to aid in the structure and coordination of relief efforts in Haiti and future catastrophic events as well. By 4 March, the American Red Cross, in conjunction with Mobile Accord's mGive platform, had raised a total of $50 million for victims of the Haiti earthquake. James Eberhard of Mobile Accord stated that $32.5 million of the donations came from text giving.

On 10 April, due to the potential threat of mudslides and flooding from the upcoming rainy season, the Haitian government began operations to move thousands of refugees to a more secure location north of the capital.

== Recovery ==
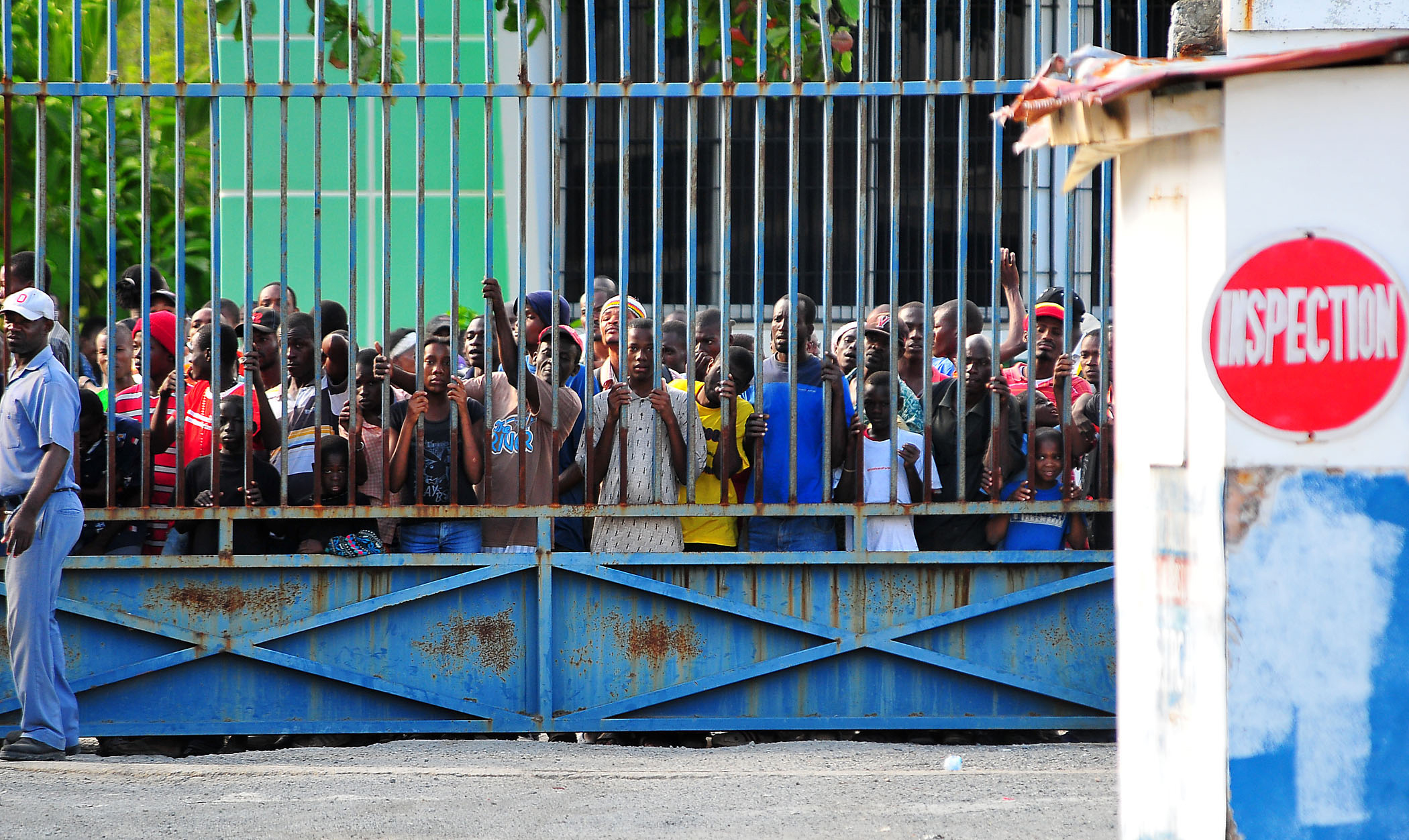
Haitians await the opening of a supply depot, 16 January.

US President Barack Obama announced that former presidents Bill Clinton, who was the UN special envoy to Haiti at the time, and George W. Bush would coordinate efforts to raise funds for Haiti's recovery. Secretary of State Hillary Clinton visited Haiti on 16 January to survey the damage and stated that US$48 million had been raised already in the US to help Haiti recover. Following the meeting with Secretary Clinton, President Préval stated that the highest priorities in Haiti's recovery were establishing a working government, clearing roads, and ensuring the streets were cleared of bodies to improve sanitary conditions.

US Vice President Joe Biden stated on 16 January that President Obama "does not view this as a humanitarian mission with a life cycle of a month. This will still be on our radar screen long after it's off the crawler at CNN. This is going to be a long slog."

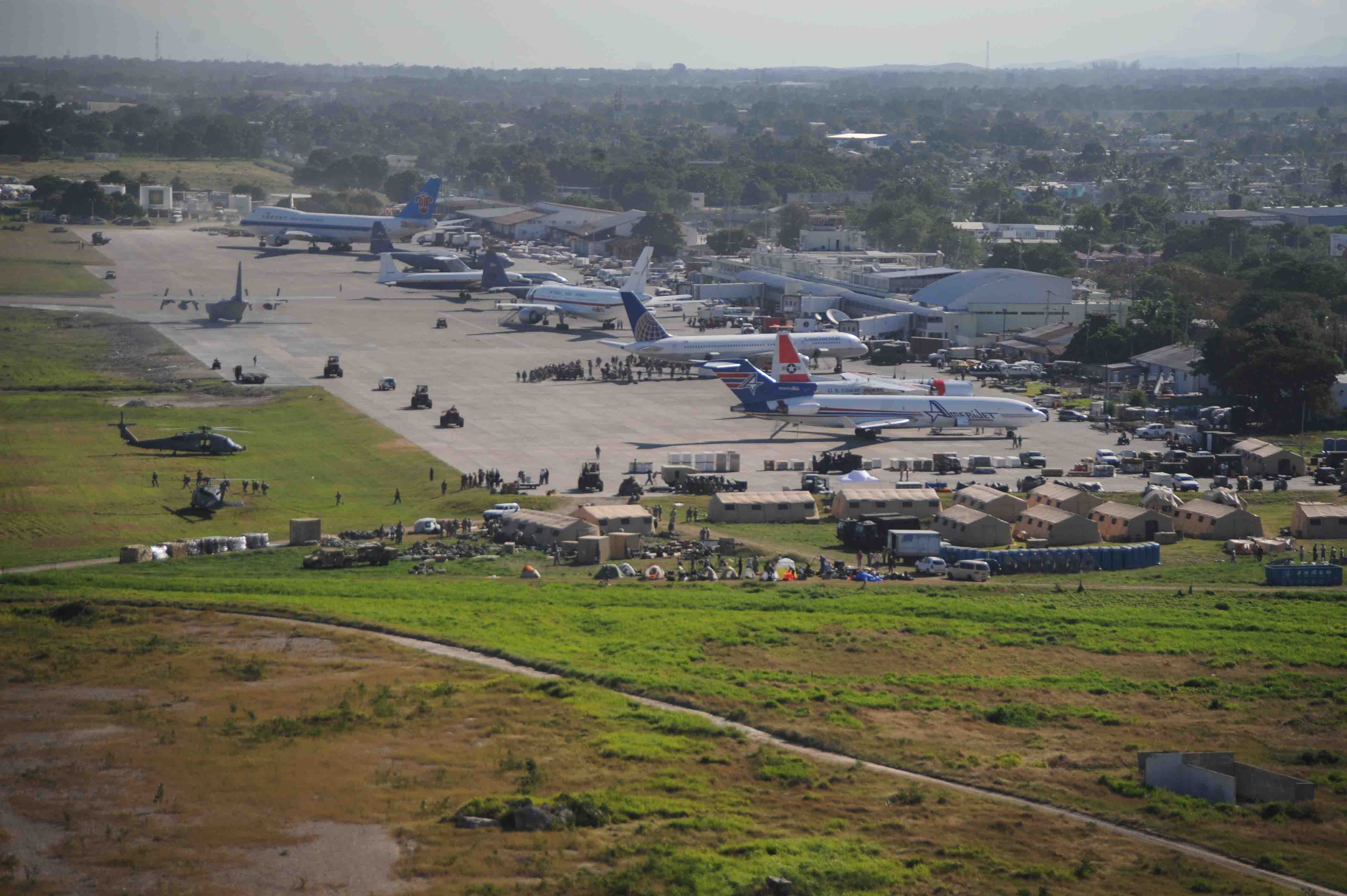
Planes loaded with aid supplies crowd the tarmac at Port-au-Prince airport, waiting to be unloaded, 18 January.

A remake of the song "Wavin' Flag" by Somalian-Canadian singer K'naan became a charity single in Canada, reaching number 1 on the "Canadian Hot 100" chart. The song was later chosen as Coca-Cola's promotional anthem for the 2010 FIFA World Cup hosted by South Africa.

Trade and Industry Minister Josseline Colimon Fethiere estimated that the earthquake's toll on the Haitian economy would be massive, with one in five jobs lost. In response to the earthquake, foreign governments offered badly needed financial aid. The European Union promised €330 million for emergency and long-term aid. Brazil announced R$375 million for long-term recovery aid, R$25 million of which was in immediate funds. The United Kingdom's Secretary of State for International Development Douglas Alexander called the result of the earthquake an "almost unprecedented level of devastation", and committed the UK to £20 million in aid, while France promised €10 million. Italy announced it would waive repayment of the €40 million it had loaned to Haiti, and the World Bank waived the country's debt repayments for five years. On 14 January, the US government announced it would give US$100 million to the aid effort and pledged that the people of Haiti "will not be forgotten".

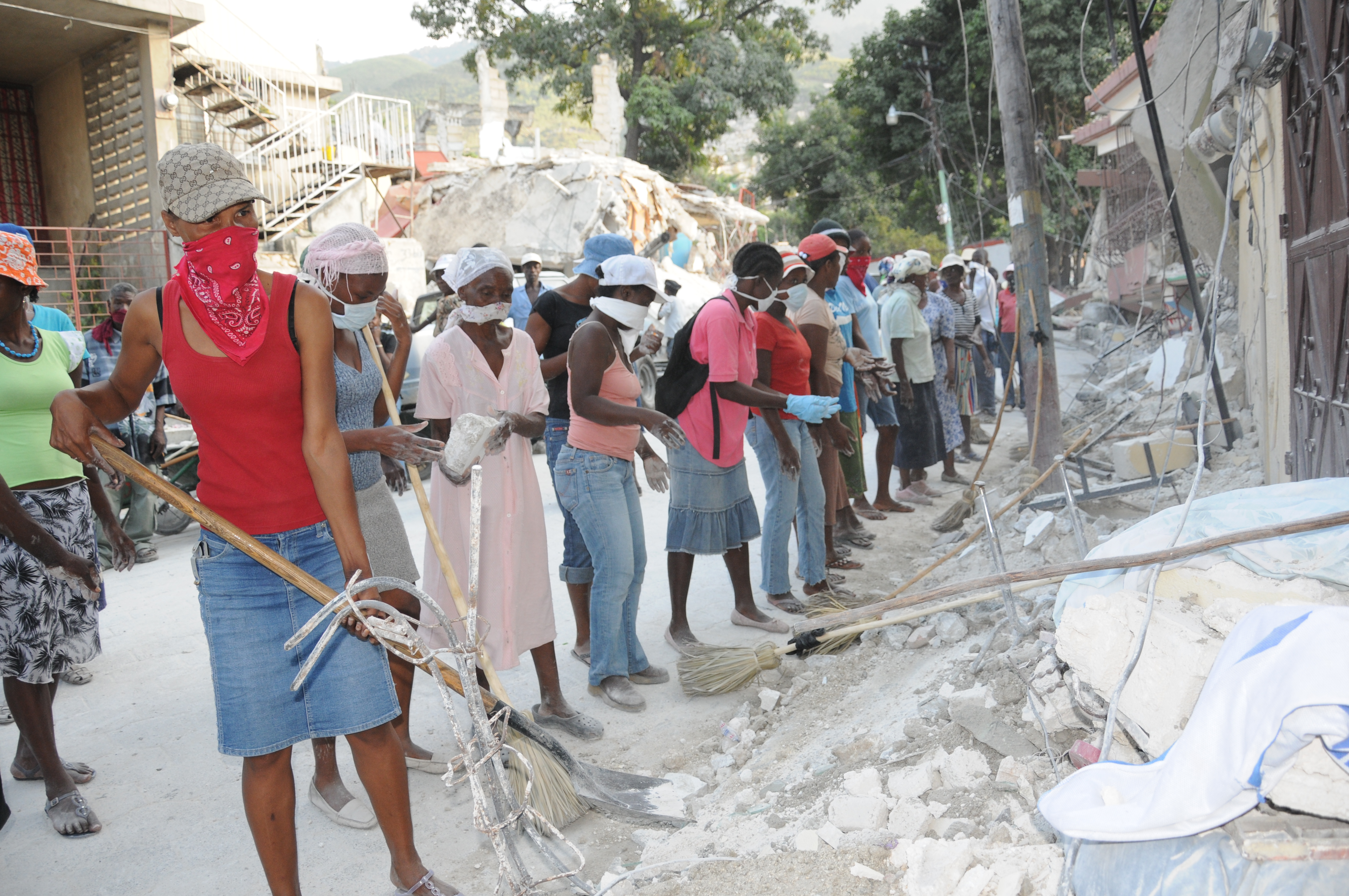
The UN Development Programme employed hundreds of Haitians to clear roads and to make fuel pellets in a cash-for-work scheme.

In the aftermath of the earthquake, the government of Canada announced that it would match the donations of Canadians up to a total of C$50 million. Canadians were able to donate through the Humanitarian Coalition which distributed funds to partner organizations working in the field. During this time the Humanitarian Coalition raised over C$15 Million. After a United Nations call for help for the people affected by the earthquake, Canada pledged an additional C$60 million in aid on 19 January 2010, bringing Canada's total contribution to C$135 million. By 8 February 2010, the federal International Co-operation Department, through the Canadian International Development Agency (CIDA), had already provided about C$85 million in humanitarian aid through UN agencies, the International Federation of Red Cross and Red Crescent Societies and to organizations such as CARE, Médecins du Monde, Save the Children, Oxfam Quebec, the Centre for International Studies and co-operation, and World Vision. On 23 January 2010, Canadian Prime Minister Stephen Harper announced that the federal government had lifted the limit on the amount of money allocated for matching individual donations to relief efforts, and that the federal government would continue to match individual donations until 12 February 2010; by the deadline, Canadians had privately raised C$220 million. On top of matching donations, International Co-operation Minister Bev Oda pledged an additional C$290 million in long-term relief to be spent between 2010 and 2012, including C$8 million in debt relief to Haiti, part of a broader cancellation of the country's overall World Bank debt. The government's commitment to provide C$550 million in aid and debt relief and Canadians' individual donations amount to a total of C$770 million.

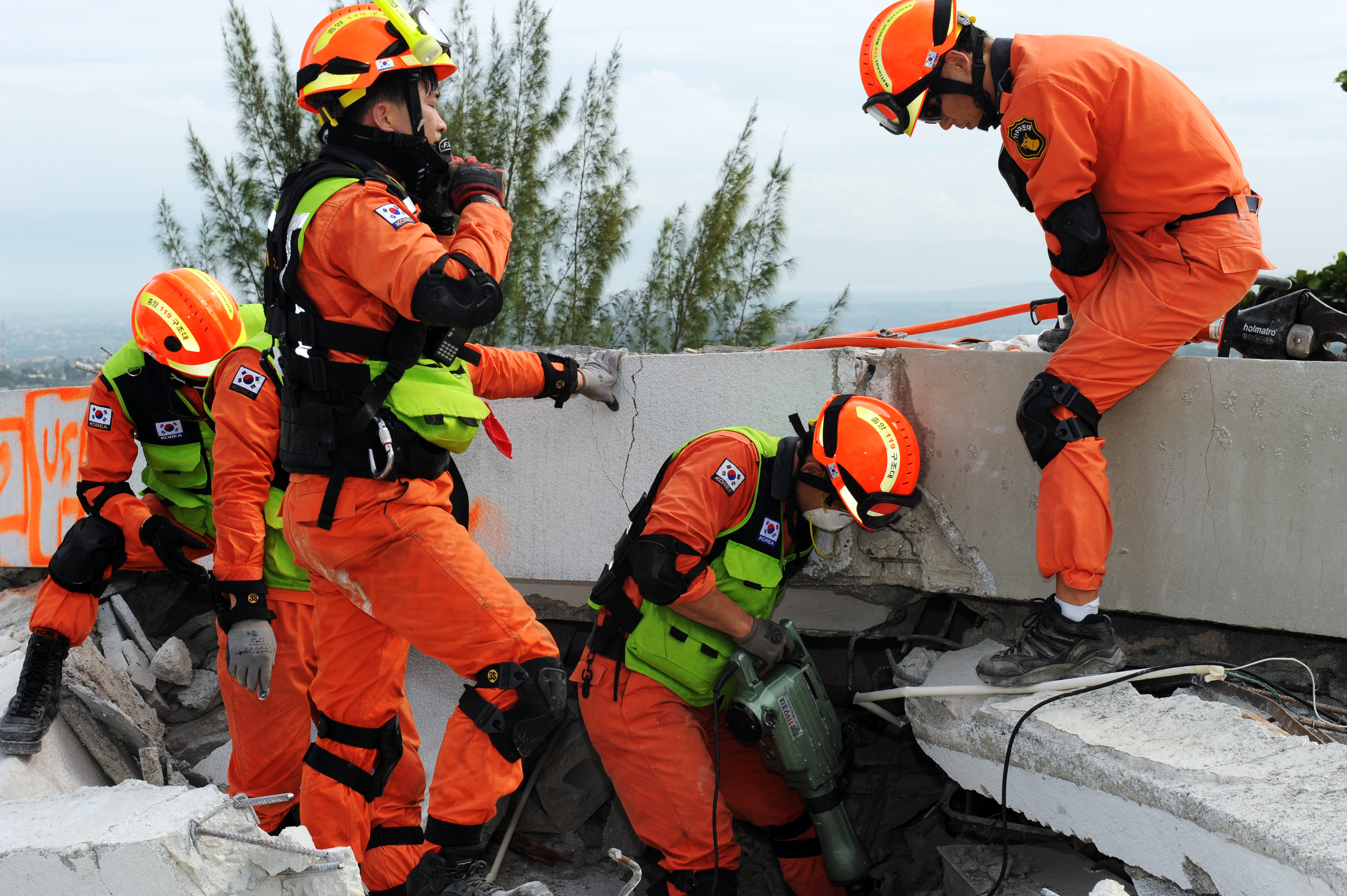
South Korea's National Rescue Services team

In addition to Canada's federal government, the governments of several of the provinces and territories of Canada also announced that they would provide immediate emergency aid to Haiti. On 18 January 2010, the province of Quebec, whose largest city – Montreal – houses the country's largest Haitian diaspora, pledged C$3 million in emergency aid. Both the provincial government of Quebec and the Canadian federal government reaffirmed their commitment to rebuilding Haiti at the 2010 Francophonie Summit; Prime Minister Harper used his opening speech to "tell the head of the Haitian delegation to keep up their spirits" and to urge other nations to continue to support recovery efforts.

President Abdoulaye Wade of Senegal offered interested Haitians free land in Senegal; depending on how many respond to the offer, this could include up to an entire region. Around 2,000 Haitians applied for this offer. In October 2010, 163 of these applicants arrived in Senegal. They are Haitian students who were selected to continue their education in Senegal.

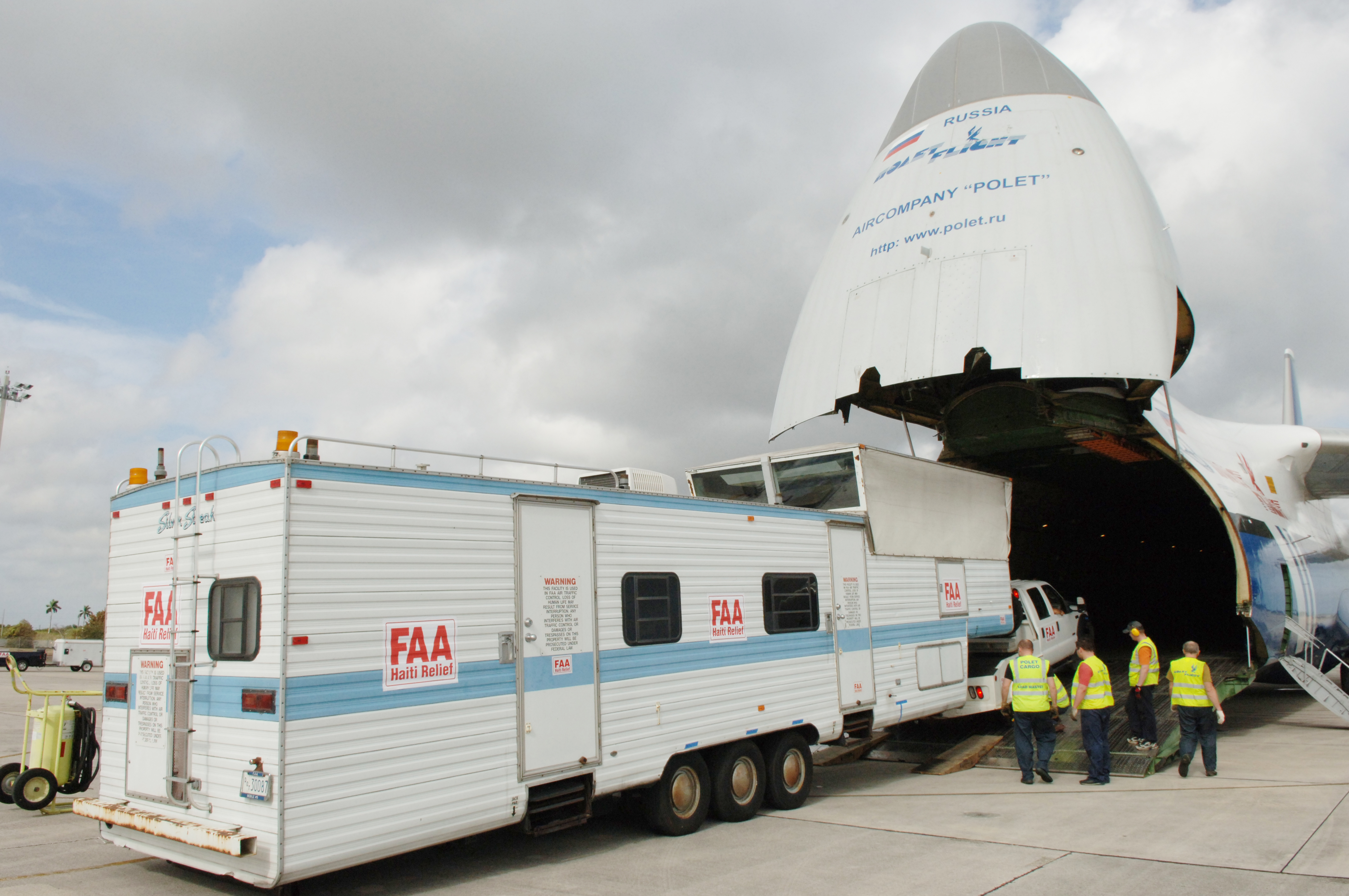
A US mobile air traffic control tower is moved to Haiti by a Russian Antonov An-124 Ruslan.

Prime Minister Bellerive announced that from 20 January, people would be helped to relocate outside the zone of devastation, to areas where they may be able to rely on relatives or better fend for themselves; people who have been made homeless would be relocated to the makeshift camps created by residents within the city, where a more focused delivery of aid and sanitation could be achieved. Port-au-Prince, according to an international studies professor at the University of Miami, was ill-equipped before the disaster to sustain the number of people who had migrated there from the countryside over the past ten years to find work. After the earthquake, thousands of Port-au-Prince residents began returning to the rural towns they came from.

On 25 January a one-day conference was held in Montreal to assess the relief effort and discuss further plans. Prime Minister Bellerive told delegates from 20 countries that Haiti would need "massive support" for its recovery from the international community. A donors' conference was expected to be held at the UN headquarters in New York in March, however, took more than three months to hold the UN conference. The 26-member international Interim Haiti Reconstruction Commission, headed by Bill Clinton and Haitian Prime Minister Jean-Max Bellerive, convened in June 2010. That committee is overseeing the US$5.3 billion pledged internationally for the first two years of Haiti's reconstruction.

The commission was critiqued by Haitian groups for lacking Haitian civil society representation and accountability mechanisms. Half the representation on the commission was given to foreigners who effectively bought their seats by pledging certain amounts of money. An international development consultant contracted by the commission was quoted as saying, "Look, you have to realize the IHRC [commission] was not intended to work as a structure or entity for Haiti or Haitians. It was simply designed as a vehicle for donors to funnel multinationals' and NGOs' project contracts."

The Netherlands sponsored a project, called Radio555. The Dutch radio channels 3FM, Radio 538 and Radio Veronica all broadcast under the name of Radio555, funded by a contribution of €80 million.

Several organizations of the US building industry and government, such as the Department of Homeland Security and the International Code Council, among others, reported that they were compiling a "Haiti Toolkit" coordinated by the National Institute of Building Sciences. The toolkit would comprise building technology resources and best practices for consideration by the Haitian government with the goal of creating a more resilient infrastructure to prevent future losses of life.

Immediately following the earthquake, Real Medicine Foundation began providing medical staffing, in-kind medical supplies and strategic coordination to help meet the surging needs of the health crisis on the ground. Working in close partnership with other relief organizations, Real Medicine organized deployments of volunteer medical specialists to meet the needs of partner hospitals and clinics at the Haiti–Dominican Republic border and in Port-au-Prince, provided direct funding, medical supplies and pharmaceuticals to local health facilities and partner hospitals, provided advisory services and coordination to local health facilities, including physical therapy support, and coordinated mobile health outreaches, field clinics and food supplies to outlying villages overlooked in the relief effort.

On 15 January 2011, the Catholic Relief Services announced a US$200 million, five-year relief and reconstruction program that covers shelter, health, livelihoods, and child protection among its program areas.

=== Status of the recovery ===
Six months after the quake as much as 98% of the rubble remained uncleared. An estimated 26 million cubic yards (20 million cubic meters) remained, making most of the capital impassable, and thousands of bodies remained in the rubble. The number of people in relief camps of tents and tarps since the quake was 1.6 million, and almost no transitional housing had been built. Most of the camps had no electricity, running water, or sewage disposal, and the tents were beginning to fall apart. Crime in the camps was widespread, especially against women and girls. Between 23 major charities, US$1.1 billion had been collected for Haiti for relief efforts, but only two percent of the money had been released. According to a CBS report, US$3.1 billion had been pledged for humanitarian aid and was used to pay for field hospitals, plastic tarps, bandages, and food, plus salaries, transportation and upkeep of relief workers. By May 2010, enough aid had been raised internationally to give each displaced family a cheque for US$37,000.

In July 2010, CNN returned to Port-au-Prince and reported, "It looks like the quake just happened yesterday", and Imogen Wall, spokeswoman for the United Nations office of humanitarian affairs in Haiti, said that "six months from that time it may still look the same".

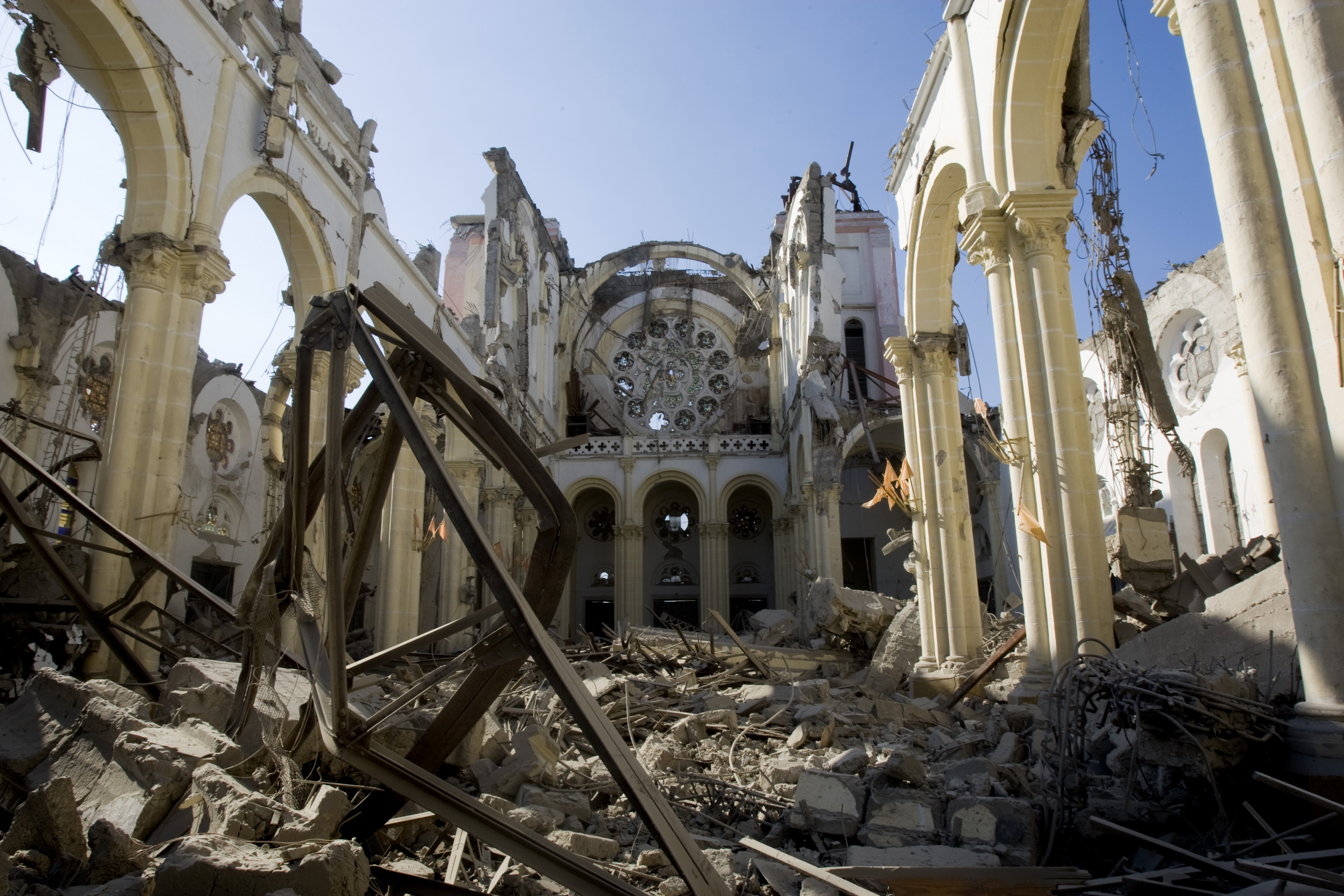
Remnants of the Cathedral of Our Lady of the Assumption after its collapse. In 2020, the building is still in ruins.

Haitian grassroots groups advocated for the government to fulfill the right to housing as designated in the Haitian constitution, and for donor governments to support this as well. They also worked to push the international community to recognize the wave of evictions from camps that started as early as three months after the earthquake and to put protections in place, but little was done in response.

In September 2010 there were over one million refugees still living in tents, and the humanitarian situation was characterized as still being in the emergency phase, according to the Apostolic Nuncio to Haiti, Archbishop Bernard Auza. He went on to say that the number was rising instead of diminishing, and reported that the state had decided to first rebuild downtown Port-au-Prince and a new government center, but reconstruction had not yet begun.

In October 2010, Refugees International characterized the aid agencies as dysfunctional and inexperienced saying,"The people of Haiti are still living in a state of emergency, with a humanitarian response that appears paralyzed". It was reported that gang leaders and land owners were intimidating the displaced and that sexual, domestic, and gang violence in and around the camps was rising. They claimed that rape of Haitian women and girls who had been living in camps since the January earthquake was increasing, in part, because the United Nations wasn't doing enough to protect them.

In October, a cholera epidemic broke out, probably introduced by United Nations peacekeepers. Cholera most often affects poor countries with limited access to clean water and proper sanitation. By the end of 2010, more than 3,333 had died at a rate of about 50 deaths a day.

==== 2011 ====
In January 2011, one year after the quake, Oxfam published a report on the status of the recovery. According to the report, relief and recovery were at a standstill due to government inaction and indecision on the part of the donor countries. The report stated:

"One year on, only five percent of the rubble has been cleared and only 15 percent of the required basic and temporary houses have been built. House building on a large scale cannot be started before the enormous amount of rubble is cleared. The government and donors must prioritize this most basic step toward helping people return home".

Robert Fox, executive director of Oxfam Canada, said:

"The dysfunction has been aided unabated by the way the international community has organized itself, where pledges have been made and they haven't followed through [and] where they come to the table with their own agendas and own priorities. Most donors provided funds for transitional housing but very little money for clearing rubble or repairing houses". Fox said that in many instances rubble removal "means it was [moved] off someone's property onto the road in front of the property".

According to a UNICEF report, "Still today more than one million people remain displaced, living in crowded camps where livelihoods, shelter and services are still hardly sufficient for children to stay healthy". Amnesty International reported that armed men were preying with impunity on girls and women in displacement camps, worsening the trauma of victims who have lost homes, livelihoods and loved ones.

On the first anniversary of the earthquake, Haitian-born Michaëlle Jean, who served as the Governor General of Canada at the time of the disaster, and who became United Nations Educational, Scientific and Cultural Organization (UNESCO) Special Envoy for Haiti on 8 November 2010, voiced her anger at the slow rate of aid delivery. She blamed the international community for abandoning its commitments. In a public letter co-authored with UNESCO head Irina Bokova, Jean said, "As time passes, what began as a natural disaster is becoming a disgraceful reflection on the international community." The Interim Haiti Recovery Commission, led by former US President Bill Clinton and Haitian Prime Minister Jean-Max Bellerive, had been set up to facilitate the flow of funds toward reconstruction projects in April 2010, but as of January 2011, no major reconstruction had started.

==== 2012 ====
In January 2012, two years since the quake, figures released by the United Nations show that of the nearly US$4.5 billion pledged for reconstruction projects in 2010 and 2011, only 43% has been delivered. Venezuela and the US, which promised the major share of reconstruction funds, have disbursed only 24% and 30%, respectively. Japan and Finland are among the few donors to have fully met their pledges. The data shows that some crucial sectors face particularly large funding gaps. In 2010 and 2011, for example, donors disbursed just US$125 million of the US$311 million in grants allocated to agriculture projects, and only US$108 million of the US$315 million in grants allocated to health projects. Only 6% of bilateral aid for reconstruction projects has gone through Haitian institutions, and less than 1% of relief funding has gone through the government of Haiti.

A January 2012 Oxfam report said that a half a million Haitians remained homeless, still living under tarps and in tents. Watchdog groups have criticized the reconstruction process saying that part of the problem is that charities spent a considerable amount of money on "soaring rents, board members' needs, overpriced supplies and imported personnel," the Miami Herald reported. "A lot of good work was done; the money clearly didn't all get squandered," but, "A lot just wasn't responding to needs on the ground. Millions were spent on ad campaigns telling people to wash their hands. Telling them to wash their hands when there's no water or soap is a slap in the face."

The Institute for Justice & Democracy in Haiti, Let Haiti Live, and the Center for Constitutional Rights have recommended immediate changes to recovery efforts to ensure that critical human rights concerns are addressed. A report found that, "The conditions in the displaced persons camps are abysmal, particularly for women and girls who too often are victims of gender-based violence". They call for more oversight of accountability of reconstruction plans, asking, "Why have only 94,000 transitional shelters been built to date despite a stated goal of 125,000 in the first year?"

On 25 August 2012, recovery was hampered due to Tropical Storm Isaac impacting Haiti's southern peninsula. There it caused flooding and 29 deaths according to local reporting. As a result of the 2010 earthquake, more than 400,000 Haitians continue to live in tents and experienced the storm without adequate shelter. In late October, with over 370,000 still living in tent camps, a second tropical storm, Hurricane Sandy, killed 55 and left large portions of Haiti under water.

At the 2012 Consultative Group meeting of the Global Facility for Disaster Reduction and Recovery (GFDRR), the Haitian delegation shared a "bottom-up" approach to disaster reduction and management based on community integration and sustainable development with a group of experts from approximately 38 nations.

==== 2013 ====
According to the International Monetary Fund, more than half of the 10,000,000 cubic metres (13,000,000 yd^{3}) of debris have been removed, and 20% of it has been recycled.

The 2010 cholera outbreak has continued. According to U.S. Centers for Disease Control and Prevention it is considered the worst epidemic of cholera since the 1994 outbreak in the Democratic Republic of the Congo (called Zaire at that time). By August 2013, it had killed over 8,231 Haitians and hospitalized hundreds of thousands more. More than 6% of Haitians have had the disease. Care of cholera patients remains inadequate with much now done in tent facilities with rows of cots for patient treatment. The United Nations peacekeeping force, widely believed responsible for the cholera outbreak, continues to refuse to accept responsibility, however, they have launched a $2.2 billion initiative to combat cholera and the construction of a $17 million teaching hospital in Mirebalais which will employ 800 Haitians and treat 185,000 people.

By the beginning of the year only a small part—$215 million—of the total funds collected for aid had been spent on permanent housing, with most of it—$1.2 billion—going for short-term solutions including tent camps, temporary shelters, and cash grants that paid a year's rent. A 2013 survey disclosed that of the 1.5 million Haitians living in camps following the quake, about 279,000 remained in a total of 352 camps. 15% of the camps had no basic protection services, and 48% no health services. While 20% lacked functioning toilets, this is higher than the population outside tent cities, where 50% lack toilets. Many camps remained at a risk for flooding and more than a third of the camps (108) were at risk for evictions. In a 2013 statement, the American Red Cross reported that almost all of the money collected for quake relief has been spent or is scheduled for making progress permanent by ensuring people can leave camps and return to stable communities, which includes building new homes, repairing homes, completing a new hospital and clinic, and signing an agreement for a second hospital.

==== 2015 ====
In 2015, NPR and ProPublica investigated the disappearance of US$500 million donated to the American Red Cross for earthquake relief, earlier described by the charity as the result of "one of the most successful fundraisers ever". Despite the claims of the American Red Cross that 130,000 homes had been built, the investigation discovered that only six had been built. The investigation reviewed "hundreds" of pages of internal documents and interviewed "more than a dozen" former and current staff members, investigating the organization's claim that 4.5 million Haitians had been helped "back on their feet". Joel Boutroue, a Haitian government advisor, said that this number would cover "100 percent of the urban area", and observed that it would mean the Red Cross had served every city in Haiti. Numerous other claims did not hold up under investigation. NPR found that the project was riddled with "multiple staffing changes", bureaucratic delays and a language barrier, as many of the Red Cross officials spoke neither French nor Haitian Creole. General counsel for the American Red Cross, David Meltzer, provided investigators with the NGO's official statistics, but would not elaborate on them. The public affairs office of the Red Cross disputed NPR and ProPublica's claims in an email, and claimed that their investigative report could cause an international incident. By June the American Red Cross had transferred the rebuilding efforts to the Haitian Red Cross.

==== 2016 ====
In 2016, Haiti was struck by Hurricane Matthew which leveled entire communities and caused an upsurge in the ongoing cholera epidemic which was introduced to the island by United Nations peacekeepers. As of March 2017, around 7% of Haiti's population (around 800,665 people) have been affected with cholera, and 9,480 Haitians have died.

==== 2017 ====
In 2017, the United Nations reported that 2.5 million Haitians were still in need of humanitarian aid. U.N. Humanitarian Coordinator Mourad Wahba said, "There are still about 55,000 people in camps and makeshift camps. Many are still living in unsanitary conditions due to displacement caused by the earthquake. We have a very long way to go."

== In literature ==
The Haiti 2010 earthquake has been depicted in the novel God Loves Haiti, by Dimitry Elias Léger.

== See also ==
- 2010 Haiti cholera outbreak
- 2004 Indian Ocean earthquake and tsunami
- 2018 Haiti earthquake
- 2021 Haiti earthquake
- List of earthquakes in 2010
- List of earthquakes in Haiti
- List of natural disasters in Haiti
- List of deadliest earthquakes

== Sources ==
This article incorporates text from a free content work. Licensed under CC BY-SA 3.0 IGO (license statement/permission). Text taken from Drowning in Plastics – Marine Litter and Plastic Waste Vital Graphics, United Nations Environment Programme.
