= Timeline of relief efforts after the 2010 Haiti earthquake =

The timeline of rescue efforts after the 2010 Haiti earthquake of 12 January 2010 involves the sequence of events in the days following a highly destructive 7.0 Mw earthquake with an epicenter 25 kilometres (16 mi) west of the nation's capital, Port-au-Prince. With at least 70% of the city's buildings destroyed, the earthquake also caused damage and loss of life in other parts of the country. The Haitian government experienced a near-collapse and affected people were left mostly to their own resources until foreign aid arrived in the following days. Initial death toll estimates ranged between 50,000 and 200,000.

== Tuesday 12 January 2010 ==
16:53 local time (21:53 UTC): the earthquake happened.

People dug through rubble, rescuing survivors and recovering bodies. The bodies were laid out in the streets, some in piles. During the night, many people digging through the rubble used flashlights or torches. The Argentine Air Force Mobile Field Hospital, already deployed at Port-au-Prince, was the only medical facility still open. Argentine helicopters from the United Nations force were helping evacuate the gravely injured people to Santo Domingo.

== 13 January 2010 ==
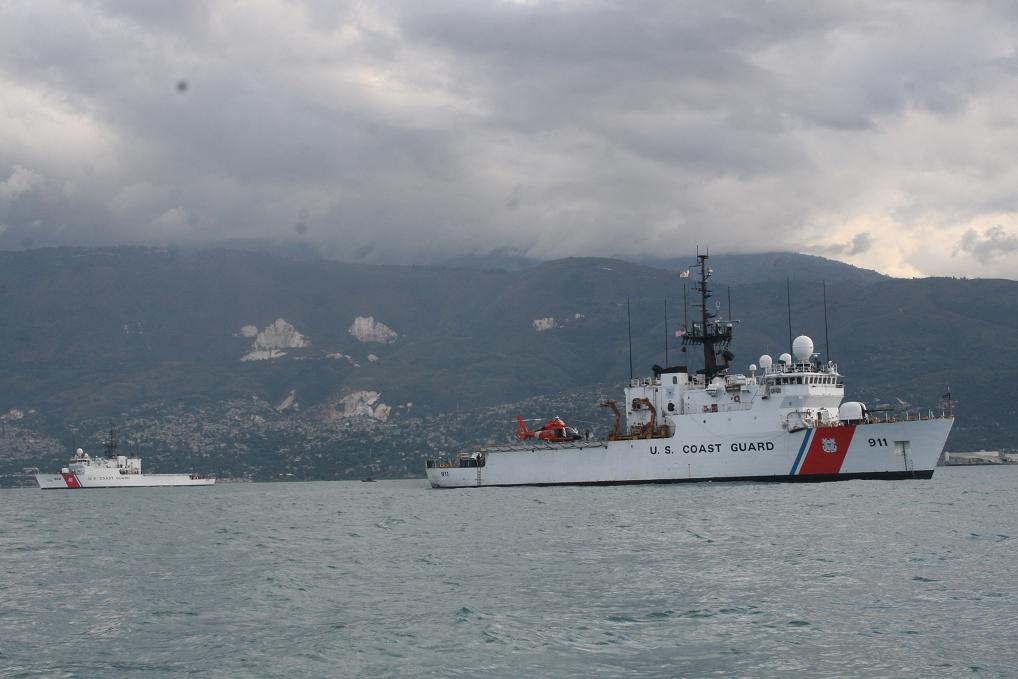
Two US Coast Guard cutters offshore of Haiti on 13 January 2010

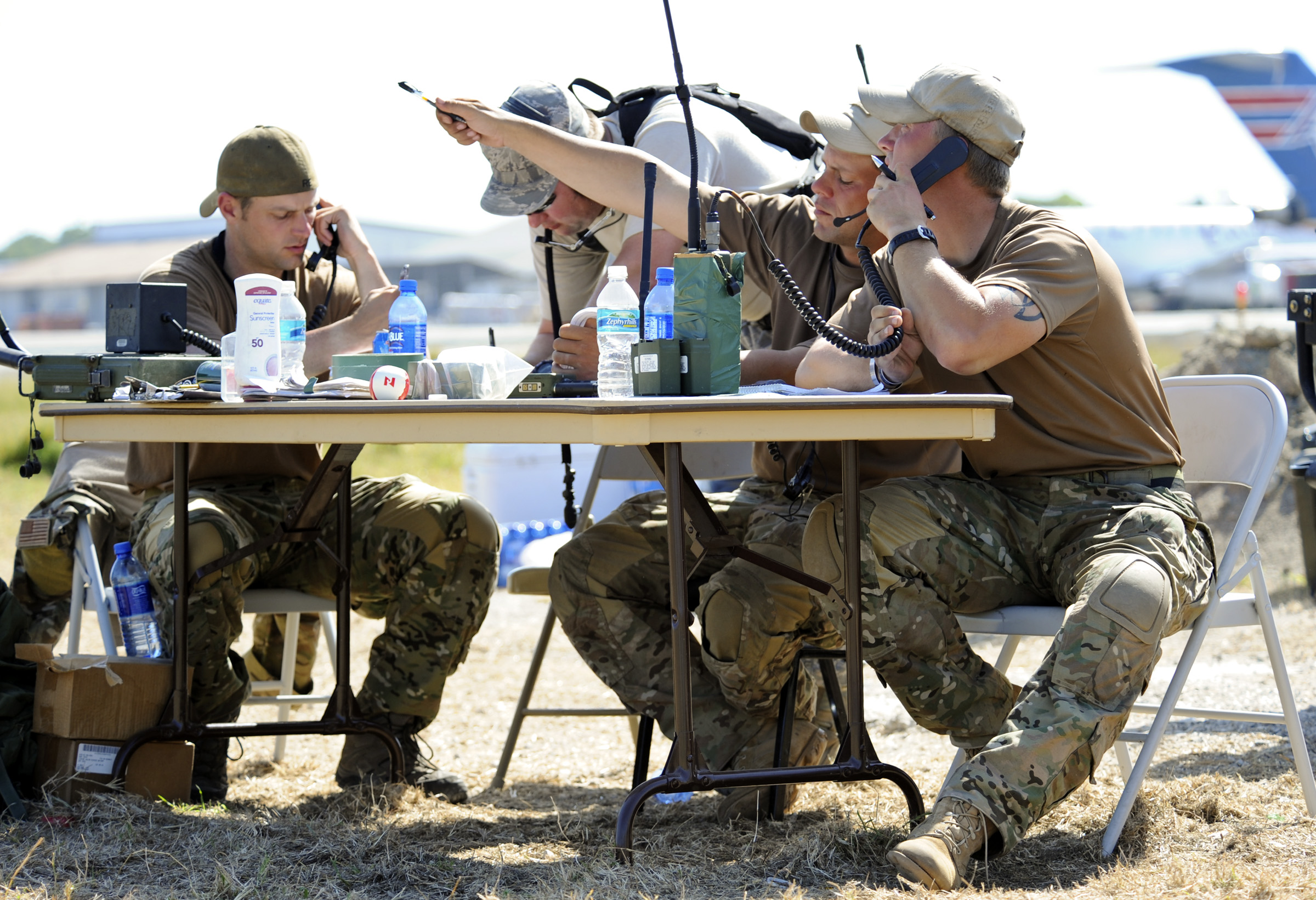
USAF Combat Controllers directing air traffic in from Toussaint Louverture International Airport

Haitian Rescuers searched collapsed buildings for victims. The wounded were taken to hospital in ambulances, police pickup trucks, wheelbarrows, and improvised stretchers. Many hospitals collapsed: on 13 January 2010, the Argentine military field hospital remained open in Port-au-Prince, and it was struggling to attend to the huge numbers of injured. Médecins Sans Frontières (Doctors Without Borders) reported that at least two hospitals were still in good shape, and their doctors would begin treating about 500 people who needed emergency surgery. Bodies of the victims were piled on the streets. Heavy equipment was needed to dig through the ruins; many people were still trapped in collapsed buildings. A triage center was set up in a parking lot, but the wounded were forced to lie in medical tents to await treatment, due to the many patients, and water was scarce. In Pétion-Ville, people used sledgehammers and their hands to dig through a collapsed commercial center.

The first international team to arrive in Port-au-Prince was ICE-SAR from Iceland, landing within 24 hours of the earthquake. Some rescue teams, such as the ones from Cuba, arrived in Haiti and started their mission. The Peruvian government sent rescue teams, dogs and 50 tons of food transported by two Peruvian Air Force airplanes. Peruvian companies were providing food donations and other basic aid. However, the scale of rescue and relief efforts was yet to meet the need. Because of difficulties reaching some affected areas, some rescue teams tried to enter Haiti through the Dominican Republic. The United States Coast Guard deployed helicopters and several aircraft and cutters to the region to aid in relief work and perform reconnaissance flights over Haiti, which aided in assessing the worst damaged areas. The Coast Guard Cutter Forward arrived in the waters off Port-au-Prince at about 8 a.m. on Wednesday, and together with a Maritime Intelligence Support Team was able to assess some of the damage caused to the port. The Coast Guard Cutter Mohawk also arrived in the coastal waters of Haiti on Wednesday afternoon.

The International Committee of the Red Cross set up a special website to facilitate family contacts, which allowed people in Haiti and abroad to register the names of relatives whom they wanted to contact. It incorporated responses to those queries as they became available. Catholic Relief Services, which has worked in Haiti for 50 years, prepared food and other aid to help those affected, committing US $5 million to help survivors.

At 7pm EST a team of United States Air Force Combat Controllers landed at Toussaint Louverture International Airport and established control of Air Traffic Control duties within 28 minutes to assist in humanitarian aid efforts. The Combat Controllers directed over 2,500 flights without incident from a card table using only hand radios. Under their direction planes were able to take off and land every five minutes, bringing in over 4 million lb. of supplies. The team leader of the Combat Controllers, Chief Master Sergeant Tony Travis, was later recognized as one of Time magazine's 100 most influential people of 2010 because of their efforts.

== 14 January 2010 ==
Medical aid for the Haiti earthquake became a military-style operation. At least 20 countries provided manpower, supplies or financial aid to Haiti, while the most immediate foreign assistance was being provided by military and humanitarian contingents from neighboring Dominican Republic. Dominican president Leonel Fernández visited Haiti to set up an emergency plan for assistance with president René Préval, to include reestablishing communications, rescuing the victims, burying the dead, clearing the rubble, reestablishing the supplies for electricity and water and coordinating the Dominican army with the United Nations Stabilization Mission for the relief operations. Colombia's military also contributed to the relief effort by sending relief flights. Jamaica sent a team of 168 military and medical personnel to Port-au-Prince.

Staff of the International Committee of the Red Cross already in the country distributed medical items to hospitals and two ICRC-chartered aircraft carrying specialized staff and 40 tonnes of relief supplies – mainly medical items – left Geneva for the island. At the same time, the organization made its forensic expertise available to organizations attempting to recover and identify the dead.

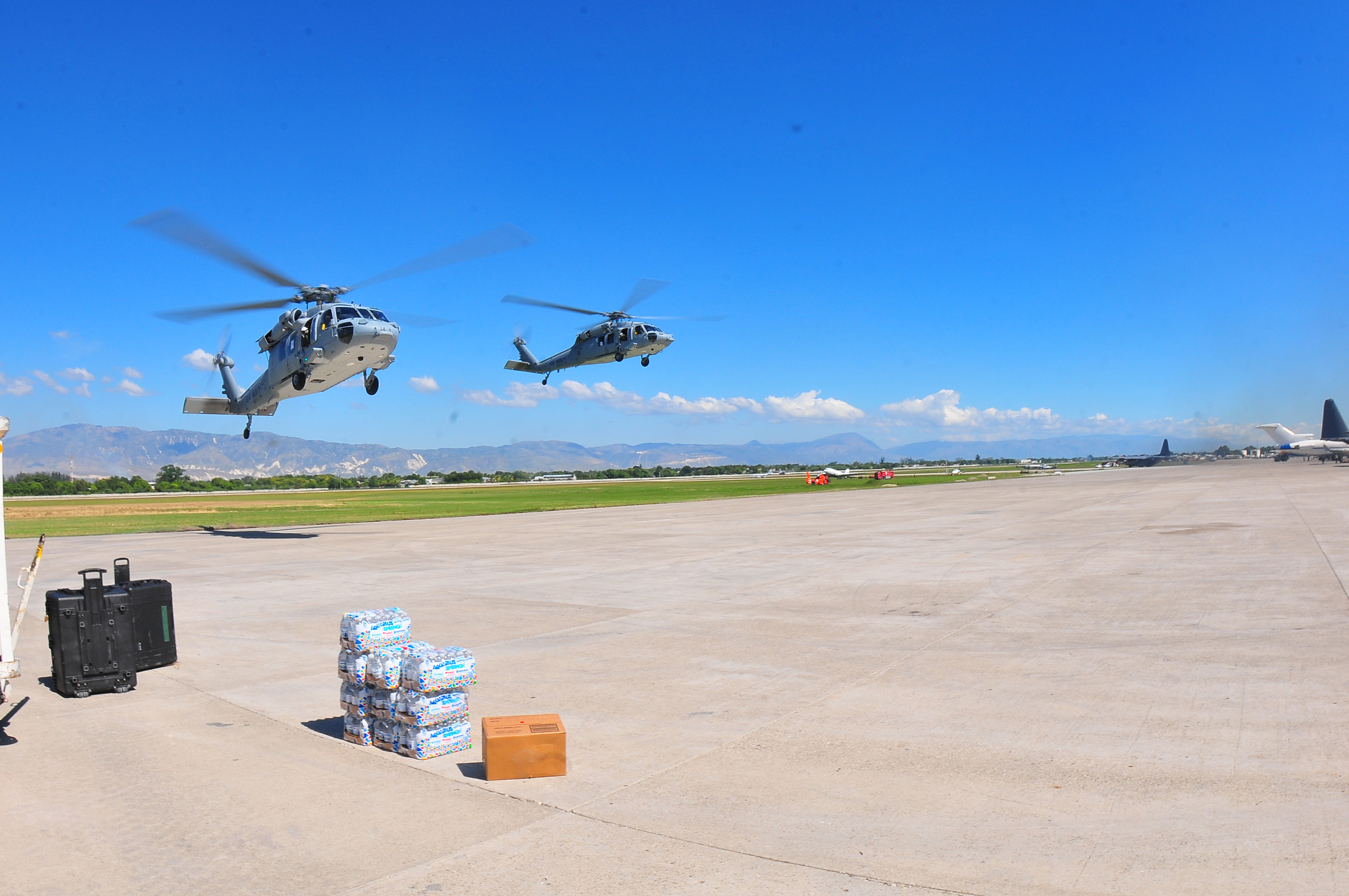
USN Seahawk helicopters arriving from rescue vessels

Communication and infrastructure problems were worsened by the destruction. Streets were clogged with debris and rubble, making it nearly impossible to distribute food, water, temporary shelter, and medical supplies that had been delivered throughout the day by international charities and governments to the airport. Ships were also unable to render aid because the port facilities had been too damaged. The Port-au-Prince morgue became overwhelmed with thousands of dead bodies that were laid outside on the streets and sidewalks. Aid workers began to concentrate on identification and disposal of corpses. Concerns were also raised by a representative from Oxfam that aid workers may be overwhelmed with rampant crime from gangs who had taken over the country, which prompted the UN to intervene to restore some order.

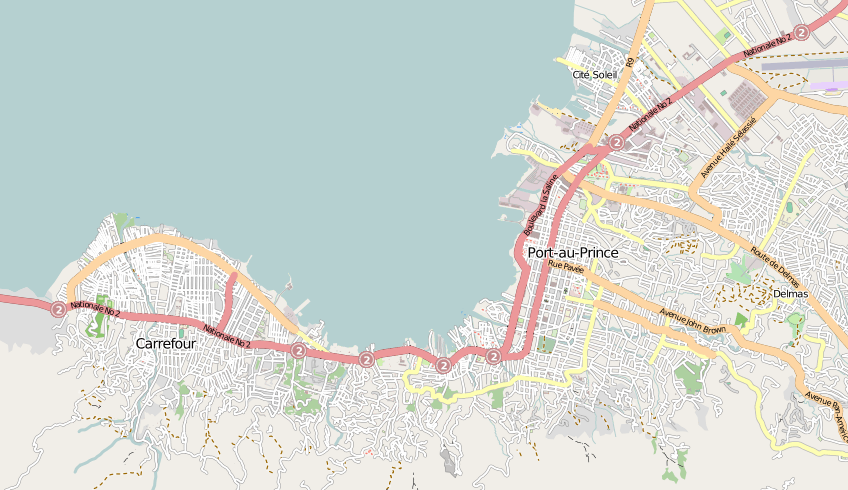
OpenStreetMap map of Port-au-Prince and Carrefour made almost entirely by volunteers after the earthquake. (link to larger version)

Social networking became a significant response to the earthquake as Twitter and Facebook spread messages and pleas to assist; "Haiti", "Help Haiti", and "Red Cross" were among the most popular topics on Twitter. However, Haitians updating their Facebook statuses were blocked for repeatedly sending messages to tell people that they and their friends or family members were alive, which triggered spam guards on the website. The American Red Cross generated $7 million within 24 hours by offering an option to text message $10 donations by cell phone, setting a record for mobile donating. The OpenStreetMap community responded by greatly improving the level of mapping available for the area using post-earthquake satellite photography provided by GeoEye.

== 15 January 2010 ==
A reported 9,000 corpses were cleared off the street by Haitian government crews, and buried in mass graves, with thousands more awaiting burial in the streets and outside the morgue. Search and rescue teams from eight nations were employed to attempt to find survivors still trapped in buildings. Transportation into the affected areas remained problematic, as a bottleneck blocked aid arriving from the Port-au-Prince airport. Some organizations landed in Santo Domingo and drove into Haiti on rugged dirt roads. Pilots were told that any flights coming into Port-au-Prince should expect to circle the airport for at least an hour, and that no jet fuel was available. Cuba lifted airspace restrictions to allow US airplanes to save time transporting critically wounded Haitians to the US.

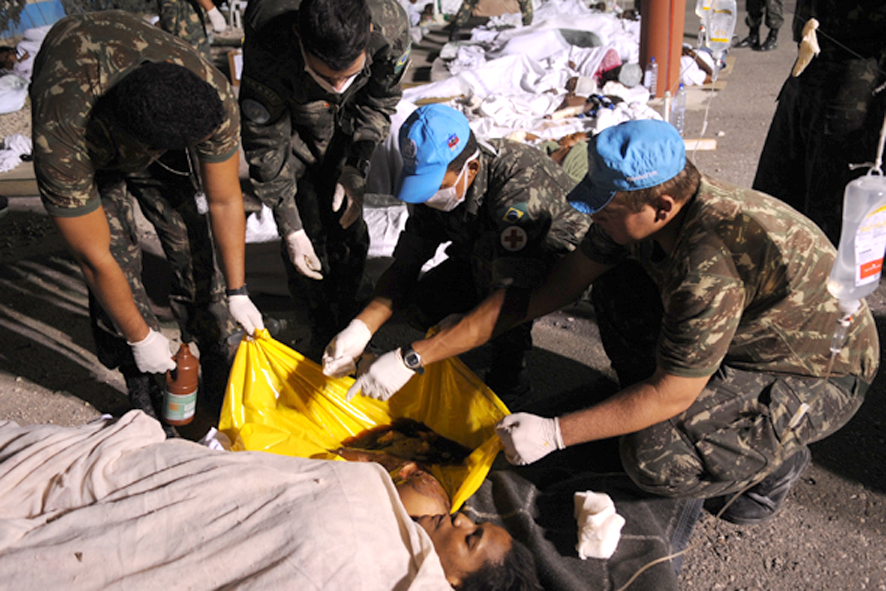
Brazilian soldiers give medical aid to a Haitian woman.

Médecins Sans Frontières reported that the need for medical services at their two hospitals was "overwhelming". Although it had been badly damaged, the Hotel Villa Creole in Port-au-Prince was transformed into a hospital and media center; journalists used the drained swimming pool as an operating base, and Hope for Haiti and the International Medical Corps started a makeshift clinic for the wounded. The Dominican Institute of Communications set up a cell tower using a satellite link, to replace towers damaged by the quake.

Canadian Prime Minister Stephen Harper announced that Canada will consider fast-tracking immigration to help Haitian refugees. In the US, Haitians were granted Temporary Protected Status after Homeland Security Secretary Janet Napolitano called the earthquake "a disaster of historic proportions". Temporary protected status will allow about 100,000 Haitians in the United States illegally to stay for 18 months, will stop the current deportations of 30,000 more, but will not apply to Haitians outside the US.

The U.N. World Food Programme denied that its warehouses in the Haitian capital had been looted, contrary to earlier erroneous reports. A Russian search-and-rescue team said the looting and general insecurity were forcing them to suspend their efforts after nightfall. Aid organizations were urged by the Brazilian military to add security details. The destruction of the U.N. base by the earthquake added to problems keeping order; the U.N. Stabilization Force was in Haiti before the earthquake to assist with emergency relief efforts, necessary because the country has a significant gang presence.

The staff of the International Committee of the Red Cross in Haiti distributed medical aid, assessing water needs and prepared for the arrival of several Emergency Response Units sent by Red Cross societies from across the world. These include a field hospital, mobile health units and water and sanitation units. The ICRC began working with the Federation and the Haitian Red Cross to enable these arriving specialists to be operational.

The tracking website Ushahidi joined social networking efforts, as messages from multiple sites were collected to assist Haitians still trapped or to get word to family members of survivors.

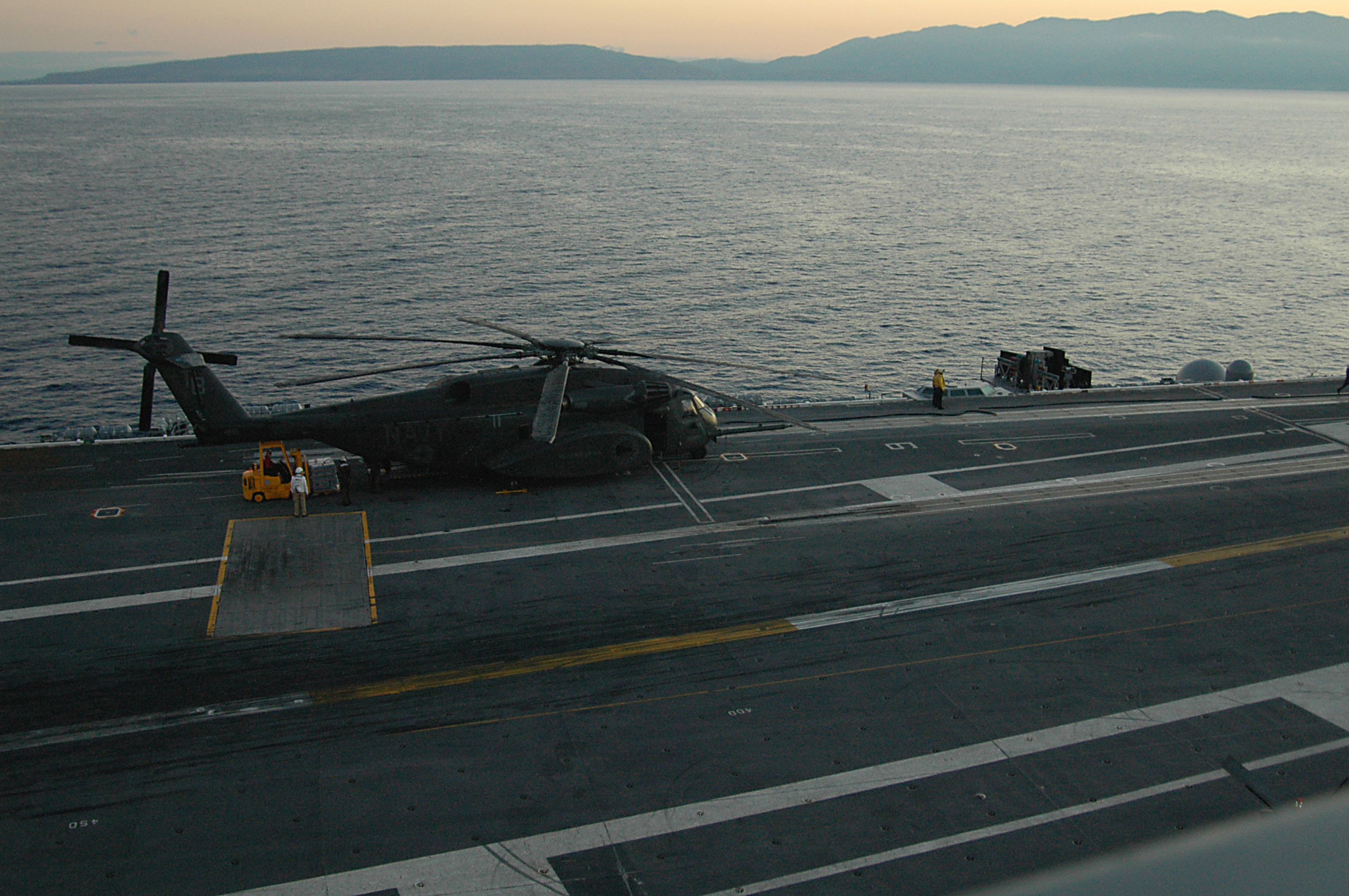
Sunrise on 15 January 2010 as USS Carl Vinson begins helicopter relief operations

On the dawn of 15 January 2010, USS Carl Vinson and her escort group began deploying their helicopters, after sailing from the US at full speed. During her first day on-scene, she transferred about 35,000 gallons of fresh water to shore; she has the overall capability to distill 400,000 gallons daily. Carl Vinson will also provide medical, air transport, and food preparation facilities; she offloaded combat aircraft in order to provide more space for relief supplies and an increased complement of 19 helicopters. The carrier is transporting 600,000 emergency food rations and 100,000 ten-liter water containers; 20,000 containers of water were distributed on 15 January 2010. The amphibious helicopter carrier USS Bataan has also been deployed to Haiti, along with three large dock landing ships and two survey and salvage vessels, intending to create a "sea base" for the rescue effort.

On 15 January 2010, an Australian news crew assisted in the rescue of an 18-month-old baby girl from the rubble of her home. While the majority of the crew assisted from on top of the rubble, a man from the Dominican Republic working with the crew became frustrated with the pace and climbed into the rubble himself. He pulled the baby out. Her uncle was one of the people trying to rescue her. He said her mother was dead. Baby Winnie was seemingly unhurt from her ordeal of 68 hours in the rubble. A Spanish firefighting team, part of the Grupo de Especialistas Bomberos de Castilla y Leon, rescued a toddler from building rubble, and reunited him with his family. It was the first foreign mission of the team.

== 16 January 2010 ==
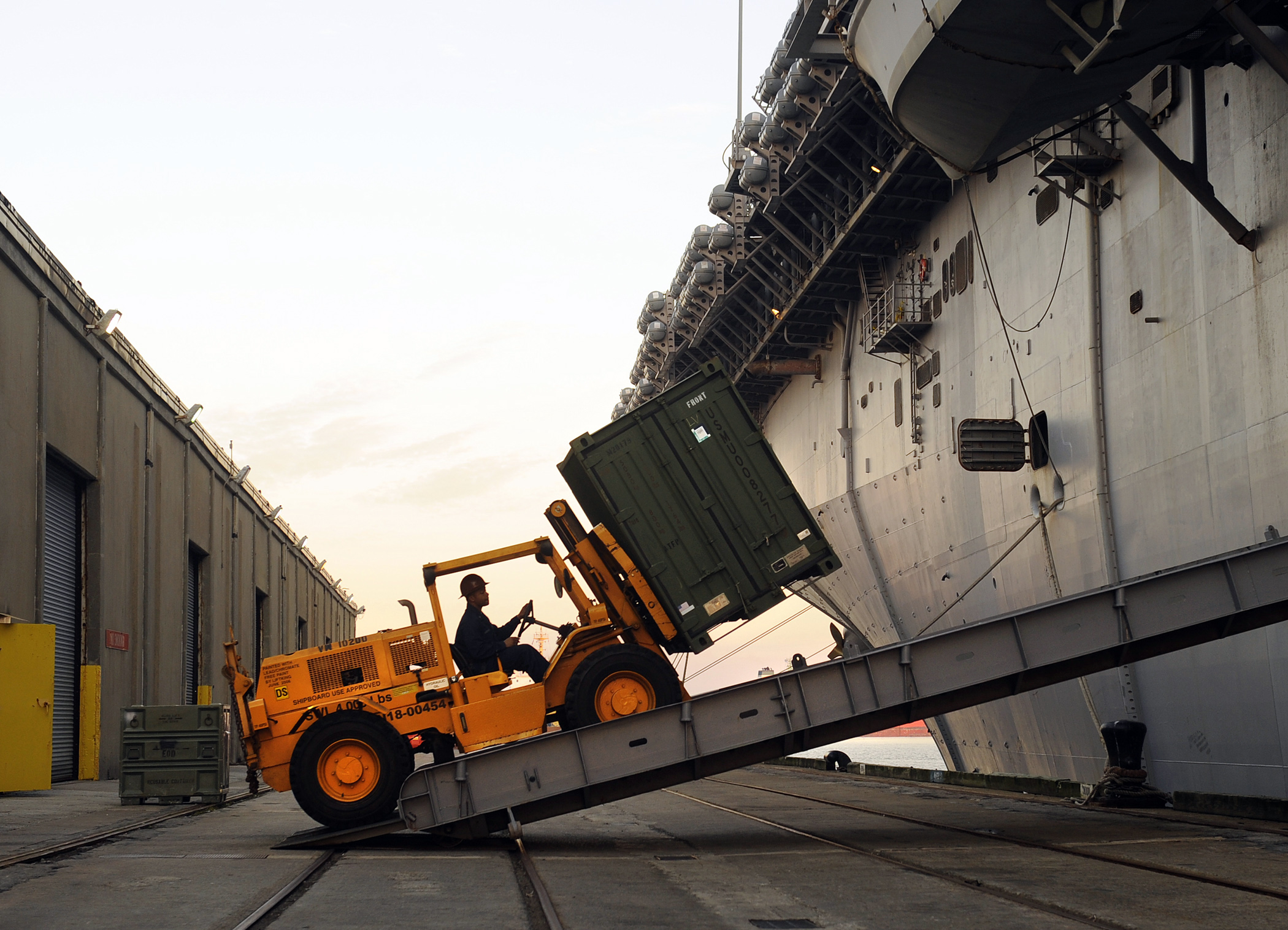
US Marines load supplies onto a ship bound for Haiti.

A rescue team sent by the Israel Defense Forces' Home Front Command established a field hospital which included specialised facilities to perform surgery, treat children, the elderly, and women in labour near the United Nations building in Port-au-Prince. It was set up in eight hours and began operations on the evening of 16 January.

French Navy vessel Francis Garnier left Martinique on 15 January 2010 carrying 60 Army personnel, land vehicles, and excavators. She stopped over at Guadeloupe to load further resources, and departed for Haiti on 16 January 2010. French cooperation minister Alain Joyandet had to liaise with the US ambassador in Paris after a French airplane carrying a field hospital was prevented from landing at Port-au-Prince airport.

Canadian Forces announced that its jet transports would be scheduled to complete two relief flights per day, while their slower C-130s will make three flights every two days; for this operation Canadian response personnel have been primarily selected from French-speaking regions.

The hospital ship USNS Comfort left the Port of Baltimore on 16 January 2010 bound for Haiti. On 16 January 2010, the guided-missile cruiser USS Bunker Hill headed toward Haiti, part of the US Navy's enlarging sea base directed at implementing disaster relief. Salvage ship USNS Grasp is being dispatched with divers whose task is to assess the Port-au-Prince seaport damage. By 16 January 2010, US military helicopters were airdropping food and supplies to the survivors.

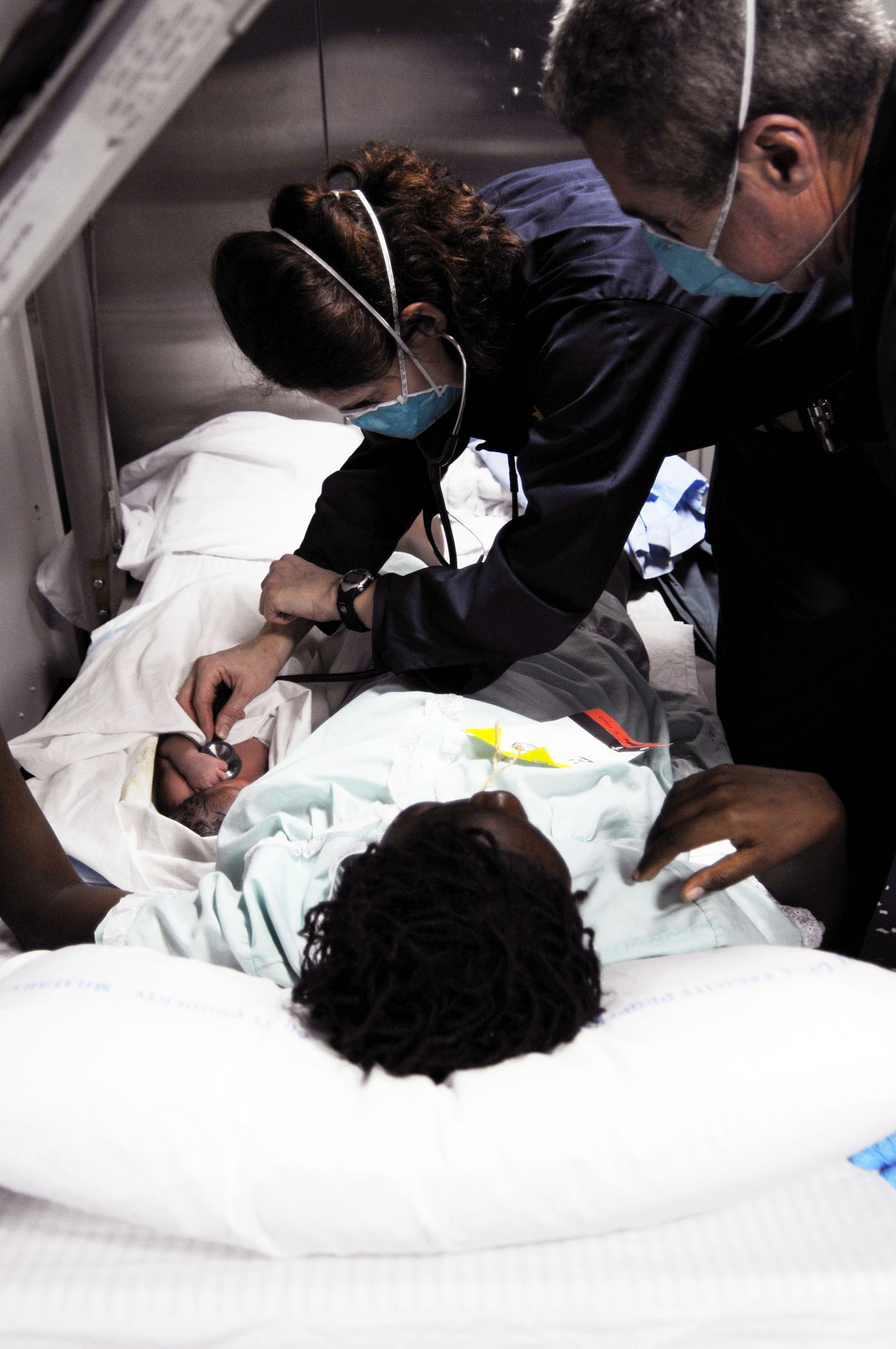
US and Canadian sailors treat a Haitian family in the Vinson's onboard hospital.

By 18 January 2010, approximately 10,000 US troops are expected to be off the shores of Haiti, while MINUSTAH retains primary responsibility for security in Port-au-Prince, according to Defense Secretary Robert Gates. The US Dept. of Defense has created Joint Task Force Haiti to coordinate the Pentagon's relief efforts. Port-au-Prince's airport, now operated by the US military, can currently handle 90 flights a day, far short of what is needed; other distribution problems have become apparent, but despite the tension there are signs that aid is reaching those in need. Paratroopers from the U.S. 82nd Airborne Division set up a base for distributing water and food as the number of dead remains unknown.

International Committee of the Red Cross emergency experts assessed the capacity of the city's main medical facilities, the water and sanitation infrastructure of Port-au-Prince's Cité Soleil neighbourhood, and the assistance needs of those living in makeshift camps. ICRC teams also provided more non-food assistance to several local hospitals and places of detention. The first Red Cross basic health care emergency response unit (ERUs, designed to provide basic and immediate health care to 30,000 people) arrived on 16 January. It included water and sanitation units, logistic units, IT and telecommunication infrastructure, and a 250-bed hospital. Many more ERUs were to be deployed over the following days.

A Haitian woman gave birth to a healthy baby boy while on board USCGC Tahoma during the afternoon of 16 January 2010; the cutter was transporting wounded survivors from Port-au-Prince to the still-functional medical facilities of Cap-Haïtien, to the north.

A minister for the Haitian government reported on 16 January 2010 that nearly 20,000 bodies had been recovered by government crews. In addition, some reports indicated total deaths may approach 200,000 with a further 250,000 injuries; other estimates showed as many as one million Haitians are now homeless.

== 17 January 2010 ==
Landing craft of this LCU 2000 class are being deployed to Haiti.

Haitian Police officers opened fire on hundreds of looters, killing at least one. Episodes of looting continued, as aid officials feared a breakout of lawlessness unless US troops can deliver the needed aid to the up to three million survivors who have not received any.

USNS Grasp and USS Underwood resupplied at Naval Station Guantanamo Bay and then began operations in Haitian waters. Additional doctors and corpsmen were transferred from USS Carl Vinson offshore, to the inshore USCG cutters, with the objective of enhancing littoral medical access for injured Haitians.

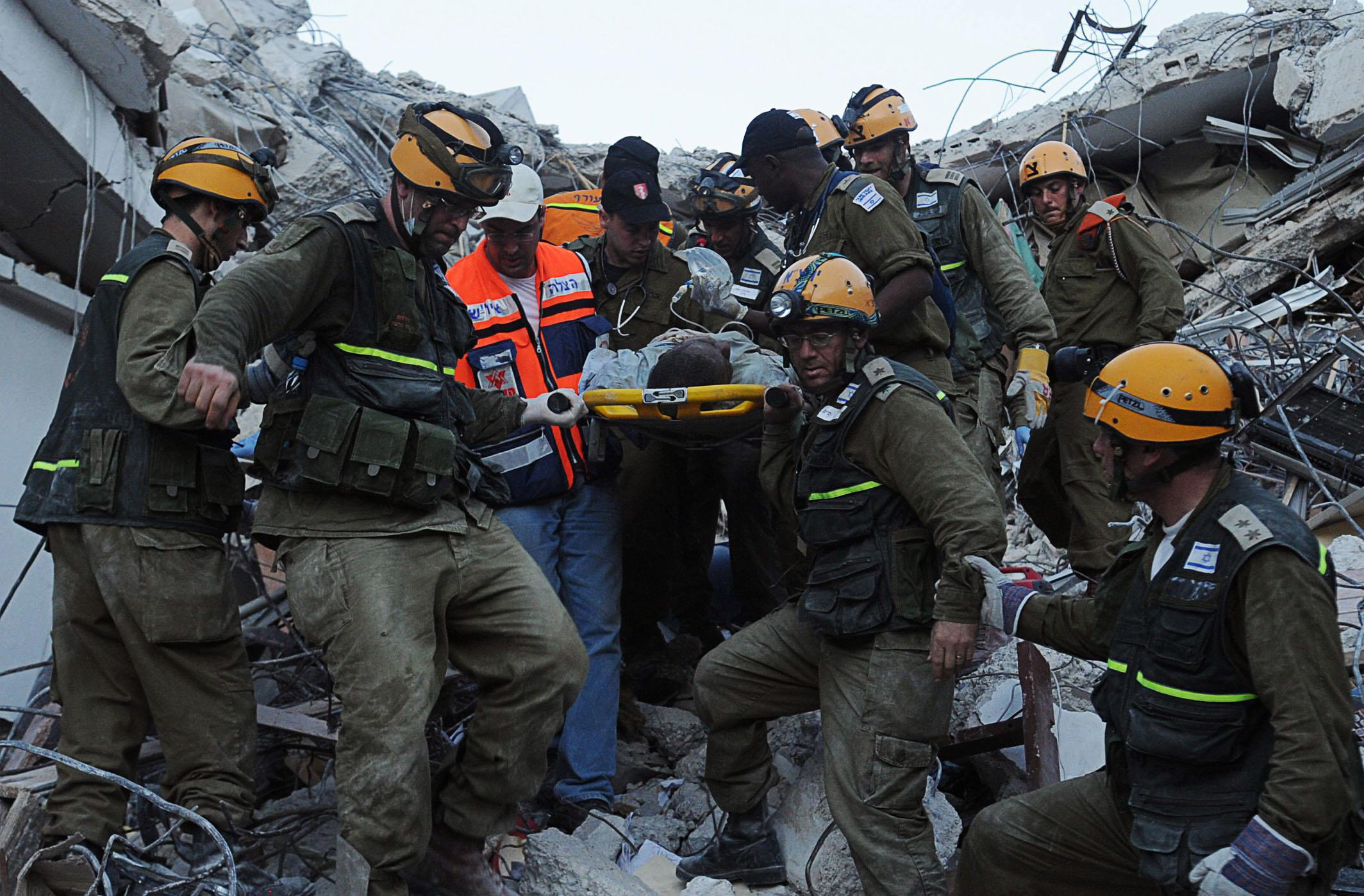
The Israel Defense Forces team extracts a person who was trapped under the rubble in Port-au-Prince for 125 hours.

The US Army is sending two landing craft utilities to help unload shipments from larger vessels, while the facilities at Port international de Port-au-Prince are not usable.

The first of three massive Red Cross Red Crescent basic health care emergency response units (ERUs) arrived on 16 January 2010. The ERU is designed to provide basic and immediate health care to 30,000 people. So far, 14 ERUs have been deployed to Haiti, with most expected to arrive in the coming days. They include water and sanitation units, logistic units, IT and telecommunication infrastructure, and a massive 250-bed hospital.

Two aftershock earthquakes measuring 4.6 and 4.7 struck an area about ten miles West of the Haitian capital of Port-au-Prince.

It was announced that Canada would send 1,000 soldiers from Royal 22^{e} Régiment to help secure a rapidly deteriorating Haiti in addition to about 200 Canadian soldiers already on the ground there (Operation Hestia).

== 18 January 2010 ==
US Marines with the 22nd Marine Expeditionary Unit (MEU) – joined under the Bataan Amphibious ready group (ARG) – begin arriving in Haiti in order to conduct a Humanitarian-Assistance Disaster-Relief (HADR) mission. The ARG consists of the USS Bataan, USS Carter Hall and USS Fort McHenry. Units within the MEU consist of 1,600 Marines with the Combat Logistics Battalion 22, 3rd Battalion, 2nd Marines, Marine Heavy Helicopter Squadron 461 and the MEU Command Element. 150 Marines aboard the USS Gunston Hall joined the 22nd MEU as well. Ships arriving off Port-au-Prince on 18 January 2010 included the first vessel of the proposed seabase, USS Gunston Hall, along with the cruiser USS Normandy and salvage ship USNS Grasp.

Royal Caribbean International has begun using scheduled ports of call in northern Haiti to transfer emergency supplies using extra space on its liners.

Long-awaited air drops have begun by the US air force in the countryside. Three sites were secured. If air drops are successful, the method will be used more widely. It was originally feared that air drops with no security would cause riots and other problems. By 18 January 2010, 5,800 US troops were in Haiti or offshore on naval vessels, and 7,500 Marines were sent to join their effort.

On 18 January 100 US troops were transported by helicopter onto the lawn of the Presidential Palace to help restore order and distribute aid. An airfield near Jacmal was prepared to take incoming flights to increase aid to more isolated towns west of Port-au-Prince.

Canada is sending HMCS Halifax to Jacmel and HMCS Athabaskan to Léogâne.

Spain is dispatching the amphibious warfare ship Castilla to Haiti.

The Dutch warship Hr. Ms. Pelikaan arrives at Port-au-Prince with relief supplies.

== 19 January 2010 ==
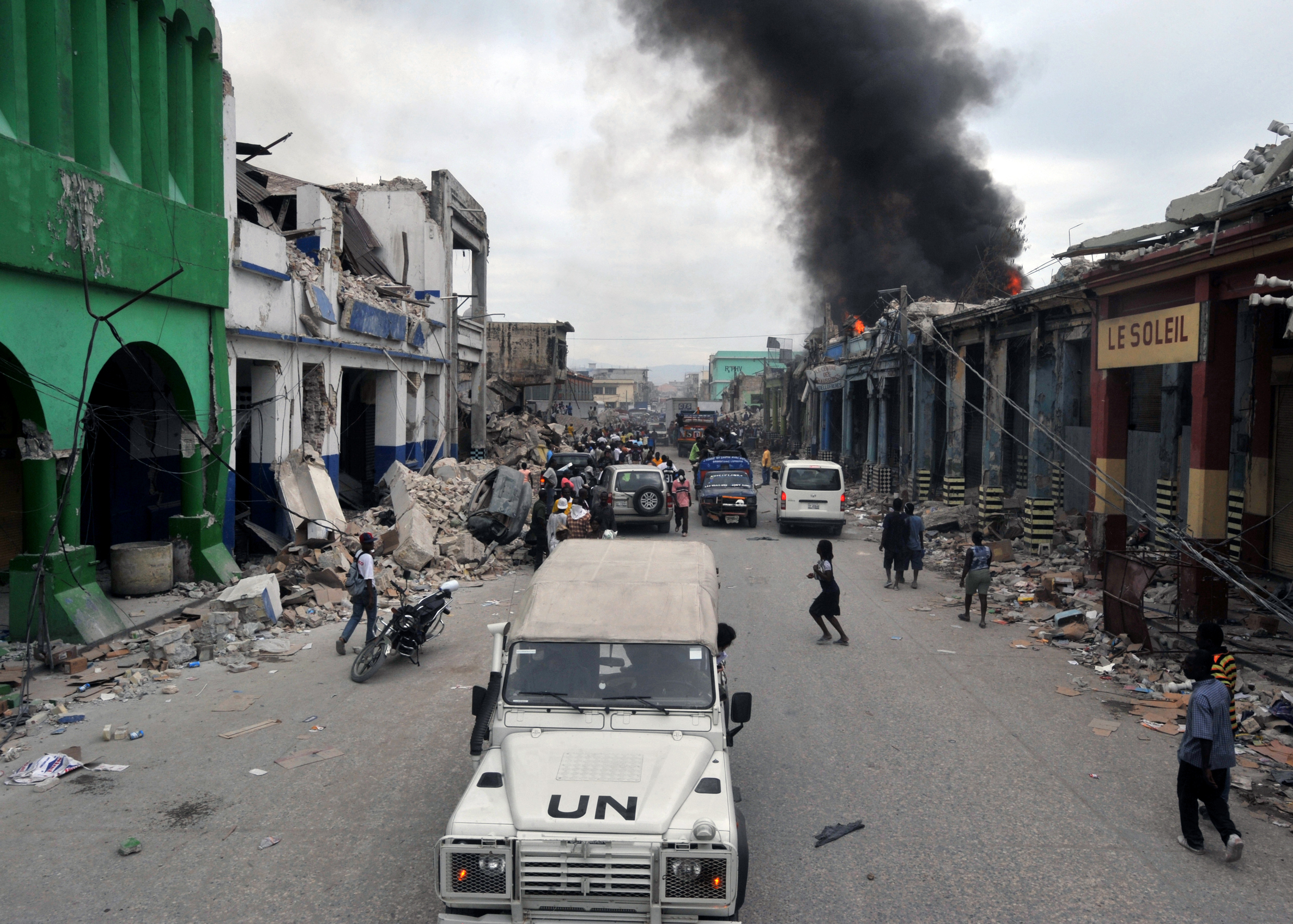
A United Nations patrol on 19 January through the damaged suburb of Bel Air

It was announced USS Bataan, USS Fort McHenry, and USS Carter Hall sailed into Haitian waters, putting most major elements of the sea-base on scene, except for USNS Comfort which is scheduled to arrive within the next 24 hours; Comfort has expanded its intensive-care center from 50 to 80 beds while en route, in anticipation of Haitian needs. Another large French vessel was ordered to Haiti, the Landing Platform Dock Siroco. The US Navy Listed its assets in the area as "17 ships, 48 helicopters and 12 fixed-wing aircraft;" this was in addition to 10,000 sailors and Marines.

With help of technicians from Radio France and TDF who installed a new transmitter, MINUSTAH FM, the radio of the United Nations Stabilization Mission in Haiti is emitting again, including programs by Haitian journalists from other destroyed radios.

A 22-day-old baby girl was found in the ruins of the Jacmel hospital's maternity ward, by Colombian rescuers. Her parents were unable to get news about her since the earthquake struck. The girl was found many days beyond the usual survival period of three days without water.

Canada's 8 Air Communications and Control Squadron installed runway lighting at Jacmel Airport, enabling aircraft to land at night, with radar control of the airspace provided by the nearby HMCS Halifax in the Bay of Jacmel. Opening the Jacmel airfield 24 hours-a-day was intended to help relieve congestion at Toussaint Louverture International Airport in Port-au-Prince.

Italy dispatched the aircraft carrier Cavour to Haiti for earthquake relief.

== 20 January 2010 ==
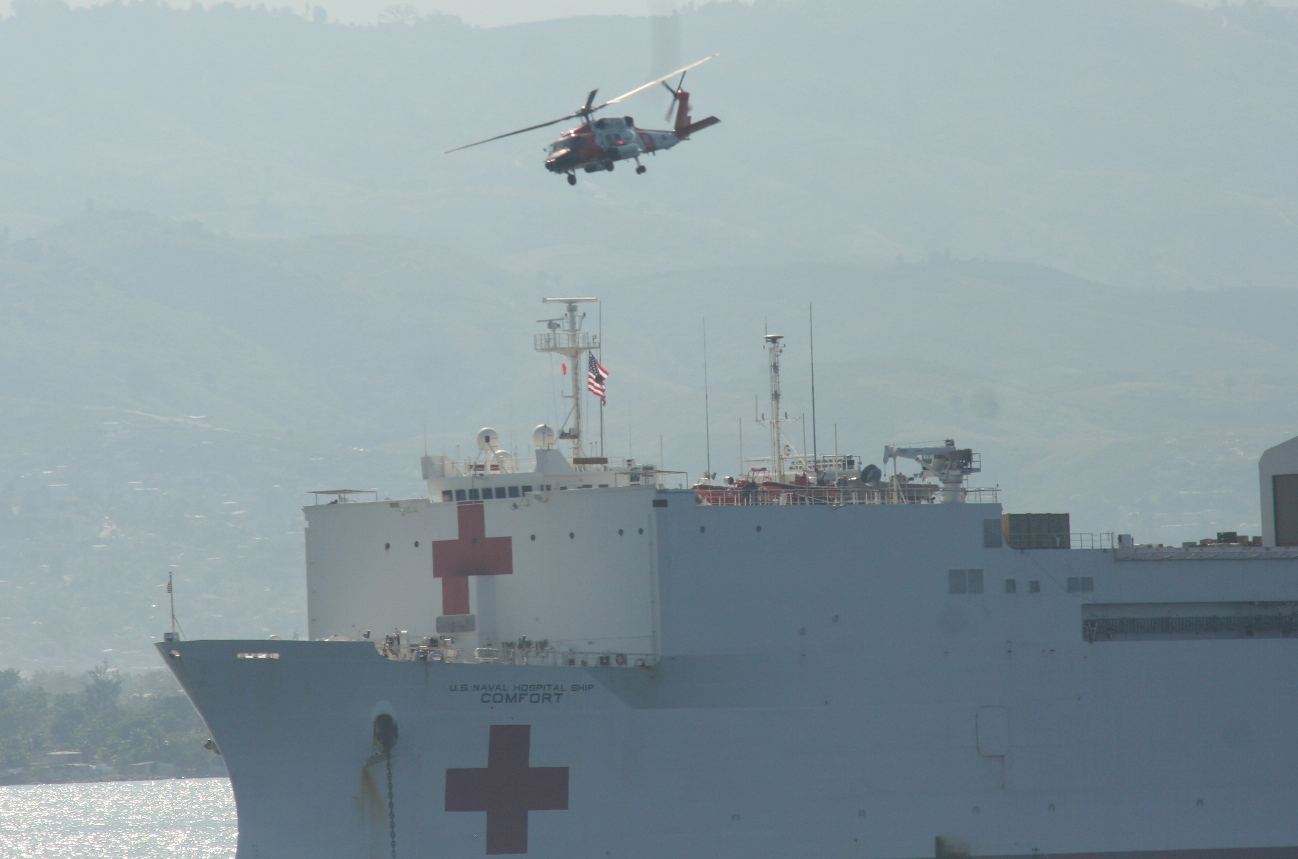
USNS Comfort, in Haiti, 20 January 2010

USNS Comfort arrives in Haiti.

== 21 January 2010 ==
The delivery of aid to those suffering in Haiti remains problematic.

Haitian burial workers continued to fill mass graves. Earth-moving equipment was used to dig the graves, and up to 10,000 bodies were buried in a single day.

Downhillers for Haiti was set up, and the bibs of alpine skiers for the Saturday event at Kitzbühel were to be auctioned off on the internet. They would be signed by the skiers.

Nassau Amphibious Ready Group (ARG) carrying the 24th MEU (Marine Expeditionary Unit) arrives to assist with the international humanitarian aid effort following the earthquake.

== 22 January 2010 ==
Radar and air traffic control services are activated by the Canadian Forces at Jacmel Airport, located near the city with the same name on Haiti's south coast, Jacmel, in order to start 24-hours-a-day flight operations. This will relieve congestion at Toussaint Louverture International Airport in Port-au-Prince. An air traffic control facility was established at the airport, runway lighting installed, and as of 22 January the airport could accommodate a mix of 160 military and civilian fixed-wing and helicopter flights per day. Further expansion of the airport is underway, with a view to accommodating heavy-lift transporters such as C-17 Globemasters.

Cuba has opened its airspace up to relief flights to fly directly from South Florida to Haiti.

== 23 January 2010 ==
The Haitian government declares an end to rescue efforts.

In a TV interview made by C5N channel, the Commander of the Argentine force in MINUSTAH declared that the different countries of the world had already transported to Haiti 14 million field rations.

== 24 January 2010 ==
Canadian military firefighters are inspecting buildings in Jacmel to ascertain which are structurally sound and usable.

== 25 January 2010 ==
Although more aid is reaching the Haitian people, the relief efforts are still falling short of the need. Uruguayan UN Peacekeepers had to fire rubber bullets to try to control unruly crowds, while distributing rice.

Haiti: Strength in Union (Haïti – L'union fait la force), the donors conference in Montreal is underway (within the ICAO headquarters building). Many attend, including US Secretary of State Hillary Clinton, Canadian Prime Minister Stephen Harper, Canadian Minister of Foreign Affairs Lawrence Cannon, French Minister of Foreign Affairs, Bernard Kouchner, Haitian Prime Minister Jean-Max Bellerive.

The European Union has decided to ship 300–350 police officers to Haiti, as part of the relief effort. France will contribute around 140, Spain 100, the Netherlands 60, and the rest will come from other EU members.

== 26 January 2010 ==
A man is rescued from the rubble in central Port-au-Prince two weeks after the earthquake, although, he claimed to have been trapped in a later aftershock.

Brazilian troops distributed food at the tent city next to the Palais National had to use tear gas and pepper spray because of unruly crowds.

France has offered to rebuild the Presidential Palace, as it was.

== 27 January 2010 ==
A 16-year-old girl was pulled alive and dehydrated from the rubble 15 days after the earthquake.

It was discovered that the south pier of the Port international de Port-au-Prince was more damaged that initially appeared, and cannot be used safely. It had previously been used by one ship at a time, unloading one container at a time, gingerly. The port continues to be used by military landing craft of the type used in amphibious warfare to force a beachhead from a seaborne invasion.

In Pétion-Ville, Nepalese UN Peacekeepers had to wield batons to try to control unruly crowds. The World Food Program convoy delivering food was one of the few to make it to the point of distribution and distribute all of the aid. Several earlier convoys were unable to complete delivery, or reach distribution points before delivery. Some had been targeted by bandits. With banditry striking right after distribution, stealing from the recipients of food aid, all UN food distribution sorties are escorted by UN Peacekeepers now, utilizing over 50% of available Peacekeepers.

Francis Garnier left to return to Fort-de-France.

== 28 January 2010 ==
Several violent incidents occurred while distributing food in Port-au-Prince. At the Ministry of Culture, Haitian police distributed oil, soap, pasta and rice. Several men scaled walls and jumped onto the trucks with aid, and started throwing stuff into the crowd. In Cité Soleil, stones were thrown at aid workers distributing rice, and their Argentine UN Peacekeeper escort.

== 29 January 2010 ==
Plans have been established by the US military to shift some military flights from Toussaint Louverture International Airport in Port-au-Prince to Jacmel Airport, to allow civilian flights into Toussaint Louverture. It is expected that around 100 flights would be shifted. Canadian Forces are preparing for the increase in traffic, and already dealing with degradation of the airstrip surface due to the current overuse at Jacmel.

141 orphans were flown to the US, in an aircraft chartered by a group led by Stephen Studdert. The group came to Haiti with 130 doctors, nurses and contractors to help rebuild the Healing Hands children's hospital.

== 30 January 2010 ==
Nearly three weeks after the earthquake, the UN is preparing to start a major food distribution program with the goal of reaching two million people in two weeks. Only women will be allowed to directly receive the supplies. The program, run by the World Food Programme (WPF) working with its partners in the relief effort, began Sunday in Port-au-Prince with the US military keeping order to avoid chaos.

The Canadian military have started to patrol Jacmel-area orphanages to try to protect against orphan-trafficking.

A food aide convoy transporting aide delivered to Jérémie Airport through Jérémie, encountered a hijacking attempt by 20 men.

It is reported that the US has stopped making rescue flights of medical evacuees of the earthquake to American hospitals because of a dispute over who will pay for the medical costs. United States Transportation Command spokesman said that, apparently, some states were unwilling to accept the entry of Haitian patients. The New York Times quoted the US military as saying that the flights were suspended because of a dispute over whether the federal government or the state government of Florida would pay for the evacuees' medical care. The White House spokesman, however, declared that the flights had been halted due to "logistical reasons that have nothing to do with funding". Hundreds of patients with spinal injuries, burns and other wounds have been evacuated to the US up to 30 January.

== 31 January 2010 ==
The UN World Food Program started handing out food only to women with vouchers in Port-au-Prince on Sunday, to control the near-riotous conditions that had previously been encountered. Nine of the sixteen identified distribution points were functioning, and the crowds were calmer. The vouchers were handed out the day before on Saturday. 55 lbs bags of rice were handed out to the women. The ration card system is to be extended to other populations besides women with family in the fortnight to come.

The US White House announced that funds and hospital capacity has been found for more medevac candidates to the US. Flights had been suspended in the middle of the week, due to concerns of lack of hospital capacity in Florida, lack of funds from Florida's state government. Medivac flights were to resume Monday afternoon.

A Canadian military medical team sortied out from Léogâne, and performed aid operations in the village of Tom Gato.

A food shipment sent through the Pignon Airport, for an orphanage in the commune of Pignon was looted just after leaving the airport gates. A negotiation between the aid shippers and the local mayor lead to a partitioning of food aid between the orphanage and the rest of the population.

== 1 February 2010 ==
An effort to transport displaced children from Haiti to the Dominican Republic has been stopped by Haitian authorities. The children did not have exit visas, and were claimed to be all orphans. The New Life Children's Refuge group of 10 US Baptist missionaries from Idaho were arrested on kidnapping charges. At least 10 of the 33 children have been found to not be orphans, as claimed by the missionaries, but have parents, as revealed at the SOS Children's Village orphanage in Croix-des-Bouquets, a suburb of Port-au-Prince.

The UN Development Programme (UNDP) is employing over 12,000 Haitians in rubble clearance, as part of the relief effort, to provide jobs to the needy. The project is called the "cash-for-work" scheme and pays labourers 150 gourdes ($4 US) for a half-day's work, and also provides food.

The relief mission has ended for USS Carl Vinson, USS Bunker Hill, USNS Henson, which are leaving Haiti for other assignments.

Quincy Jones and Lionel Richie have produced a new version of "We Are The World" for Haitian quake relief, on the song's 25th anniversary year, We Are the World 25 for Haiti

Streetlighting has been restored to Delmas.

== 2 February 2010 ==
Haitians started to self-organize their refugee camps, to provide order, so that aid can be properly dispersed into the camps.

The UN announced that Japanese and South Korean military engineering teams will be deployed to Léogâne and Gressier.

The US recommenced medevac flights to the US, after having suspended them since Wednesday last. The flights would now avoid Florida, as previous flights to Florida had used up capacity in the state.

Lawyers Without Borders Canada announced an initiative to restore and reform the Haitian justice system. It would set up aid stations, and send lawyers in to advise Haitians.

300 protesters at the Pétion-Ville Mayor's Office and nearby Place Saint-Pierre square voiced complaints about the lack of aid and food.

== 3 February 2010 ==
It has been revealed that the New Life Children's Refuge group had been informed that what they were doing was illegal, but that they proceeded anyway. They had approached various orphanages in Haiti and been rejected, because they appeared to act like child-traffickers, before being directed to a mountain village, Calebasse, where they promised parents a better life for their children, and got permission from the poor subsistence farmers to take their children away. Haiti is deciding whether it can hold a trial or should "extradite" the Baptists for trial in the US.

Quebec has relaxed immigration rules on which relatives qualify for sponsorship, to allow Haitian Quebecers to sponsor more relatives to come to Quebec.

USS Higgins has ended its relief mission and has headed for its home port.

RFA Largs Bay has left Britain for Haiti carrying a load of aid supplies.

Patrimoine Sans Frontière has announced a mission to Port-au-Prince and Jacmel, to attempt to preserve as much heritage architecture as possible, while also ensuring minimal safety standards.

The UN has announced that former US President, Bill Clinton, has been named as the chief of the UN Haitian reconstruction effort.

== 4 February 2010 ==
Cuba has announced it will dispatch a fifth field hospital to Haiti, for Les Cayes.

South Korea is preparing to send 250 peacekeepers to Léogâne.

Electricity was restored to some sectors of Pétion-Ville and Carrefour at the beginning of February.

Spanish warship Castilla arrives in Petit-Goâve.

Incidents of blackmarketeering of food aide, and corruption in the distribution of ration cards have cropped up.

== 5 February 2010 ==
Laura Silsby's New Life Children's Refuge group of Southern Baptists has been charged with kidnapping and conspiracy. The kidnapping charges could result in 15 years in prison, while the criminal association charges could result in 9 years. They could additionally face life imprisonment for child trafficking.

Japanese troops will be deploying to Gressier and the surrounding region, in February. The 350 personnel will be mostly engineers, to help with demolition and reconstruction, with some earthquake building experts to examine structures.

Downhillers for Haiti raised approximately $250,000 for Haiti relief, through the auction of their racing bibs. The proceeds were to be given to the International Red Cross.

56,000 tonnes of medical supplies have departed Bayonne, New Jersey for Haiti aboard a Royal Caribbean cruise ship.

== 6 February 2010 ==
The first 160 Japanese troops are leaving for Haiti.

After the G7 Finance Ministers summit in Iqaluit, Nunavut, Canada; the G7 decided to cancel all debts of Haiti owing to their nations. Before the meeting, several of the countries had already announced intentions to do so.

Dominica and Saint Lucia announced they would provide around 60 Creole-speaking personnel to provide help to Haiti in the Haitians' own language.

== 7 February 2010 ==
The 10 Americans of Laura Silsby's group were denied conditional release by a Haitian court, due to the severity of the charges against them. Their defence lawyer says that the nine aside from Silsby, were unknowing in not having proper documentation or following procedures, in that they believed Silsby had the proper authorizations. Under Haitian justice, they are deemed guilty until proven otherwise.

The United Nations World Tourism Organization (UNWTO) announced that tourism is critical to the recovery of Haiti after the tremblor.

USS Nassau (LHA-4) has ended its relief mission, and is continuing on with its previous mission. Aboard is the US 24th MEU, which is also leaving.

== 8 February 2010 ==
The Quebec Federation of School Boards (Fédération des commissions scolaires du Québec – FCSQ) has announced its intention to participate in the rebuilding of the school system.

A survivor was found underneath the rubble of the Croix Bossal market in Port-au-Prince, where he was a rice seller. It appears that he was trapped for the entire four weeks since the earthquake. He says that at some point, someone passed him some water during his entrapment. He was extremely emaciated and dehydrated.

The first 30 of 240 Korean peacekeepers have been scheduled to leave on 10 February 2010 for Léogâne, with a freighter. The mission comprises 120 military engineers, 22 medics and a 1,200 tonne-freighter filled with supplies and equipment.

The UN Food and Agriculture Organization has started a "cash-for-work" programme to clear irrigation canals in the Léogâne area.

The National Library of France (Bibliothèque nationale de France, or BNF) has announced that it will aid in the reconstruction of the library network of Haiti.

== 9 February 2010 ==
It has been revealed that an earlier attempt by New Life Children's Refuge (Laura Silsby's group), three days before their final abortive attempt, was tried. Up to forty children were removed from a bus by a Haitian police officer at a tent city, who informed the group that it was illegal to remove Haitian children.

Choice Hotels reiterated its commitment to Jacmel, and the post-quake recovery of the city. It will go ahead with its two planned hotels in the city.

The US 24th Marine Expeditionary Unit is rotating out of Haiti, having been replaced by the US 22nd Marine Expeditionary Unit, in their position on USS Bataan and Carrefour, Léogâne, Grand-Goâve, Petit-Goâve.

== 10 February 2010 ==
Electricity has been reestablished for streetlighting to parts of Port-au-Prince.

== 11 February 2010 ==
A Dominican legal adviser to the New Life Children's Refuge for their Dominican Republic affairs has been put under investigation in Haiti and El Salvador for sex trafficking young women and girls.

Jamaica rotated its team out, with a new team composed of 158 military and medical personnel rotating in.

== 12 February 2010 ==
The single We Are the World 25 for Haiti was released and debuted on 12 February 2010, during the opening ceremony of the 2010 Winter Olympics.

The US relief force has been reduced from roughly 20,000 troops to roughly 13,000 troops.

== 13 February 2010 ==
USS Gunston Hall ended its relief mission and has headed back to its original mission.

== 14 February 2010 ==
The 190th Civil Engineering Squadron of the Kansas National Guard has returned home after relief efforts in Haiti.

== 15 February 2010 ==
The We Are the World 25 for Haiti music video is released to the public.

== 16 February 2010 ==
½ million eggs, or 50,000 lbs of liquid egg is being donated by 8 Michigan farmers, as part of the US national Good Egg Project to donate 3 million eggs to Haiti's schoolchildren.

A barge with 100,000 tons of relief supplies is being prepared at the New Orleans, Louisiana port of New Iberia, Louisiana. It is scheduled to arrive on 1 March at the port of Jacmel.

Emergency Architects of Canada is preparing for a 5–10 year mission to reconstruct Haiti, and upgrade surviving structures to better survive earthquakes.

== 17 February 2010 ==
A Haitian judge has released eight of the ten detained members of the New Life Children's Refuge, after interviewing parents who revealed that they voluntarily gave up their children. The two remaining, Laura Silsby and Charisa Coulter, have been held over for more questioning. Coulter, who has diabetes, may be held at a hospital. Coulter and Silsby are being investigated over a previous visit to Haiti, before the earthquake. Members of the group had previously stated that Silsby had misled them. Their Dominican legal advisor, Jorge Puello, has acknowledged he is being investigated for sex trafficking in El Salvador. The eight released members arrived on a USAF C-130 to Miami at 23h30. They still face kidnapping charges in Haiti.

The first 200 troops of the Japanese deployment are inspecting the safety of buildings in Gressier and Léogâne.

== 18 February 2010 ==
RFA Largs Bay arrives at Port-au-Prince, carrying relief supplies.

The Korean peacekeepers in Léogâne have started constructing a hospital.

== 19 February 2010 ==
On 19 February, HMCS Halifax finished its operational tour, and left Jacmel.

A Canadian seismic sensor network of three stations has been established in Haiti. The network is not considered permanent, but will remain for quite some time. The stations are in secure locations, being expensive equipment, and are satellite linked to Natural Resources Canada in Ottawa. They are solar powered, so do not require grid connections. One station is at the Canadian Embassy in Port-au-Prince (in the suburb of Pétion-Ville, in the district of Juvénat), and has a permanent guard of one. Another is at the Jacmel Airport, currently run by Canadian Forces personnel. The third is at a Léogâne orphanage, considered secure, but there are problems discouraging children from playing with it. The stations are roughly 50 km apart. These are the first seismic stations ever in the country.

A Spanish version of "We Are the World" was recorded for Haiti earthquake relief. Amongst the performers were Carlos Santana, José Feliciano and David Archuleta.

Partial commercial operations resumed at Port-au-Prince International Airport.

== 20 February 2010 ==
It has been revealed that all the "orphans" of the group "rescued" by Laura Silsby and Charisa Coulter's New Life Children's Refuge were not orphans at all. 13 of the children originated in the Citron slum, while others came from the mountain village of Callabas. Silsby and Coulter had engaged two Americans residing in the Dominican Republic to be official signers for their plan for an orphanage there, in the village of Gaspar Hernandez, consisting of an orphanage, a clinic and two schools. After the quake, they engaged the local Roman Catholic Church in Puerto Plata to rent them a 45-room building at $7400/month. The baptist missionaries had invested $3000 in childproofing the building. The plan was cancelled when they were arrested, said the Roman Catholic Church, and the Baptist missionaries' real estate agent, Jose Hidalgo.

Siroco ends its mission and heads for home.

== 21 February 2010 ==
Twitter has struck a deal to provide free SMS tweets to Haitians who use Digicel.

== 22 February 2010 ==
Canadian military evacuation flights have ended, Canadians desiring to leave are now required to depart via commercial flights via Port-au-Prince International Airport, which have resumed.

In Limbé, a mob of citizens erected barricades on the exit route of a World Food Program convoy, and attacked the convoy and its Peacekeepers with rocks, to try to gain the goods carried within. The situation was resolved with no injuries and no arrests, after the National Police had been dispatched. The Peacekeepers had agreed to distribute milk.

== 23 February 2010 ==
Haitian president René Préval has revealed an estimate of needing three years to clear the rubble of the quake.

== 24 February 2010 ==
The main port of Port-au-Prince has ramped up to handle container traffic around 600 containers a day, despite still having infrastructure damage. This is in excess of the 250 containers a day that it had been handling before the quake. The functioning of the port allows increased aid shipments arriving in-country.

== 27 February 2010 ==
190 South Korean Peacekeepers left home for deployment in Léogâne.

== 28 February 2010 ==
The 240-member contingent of South Korean Peacekeepers (Task Force Danbi / Operation Danbi) has arrived in Léogâne.

== 2 March 2010 ==
The Haitian government revealed resettlement plans for Port-au-Prince, involving 5 sites around the city, two on government owned land, and three other privately held sites. The privately held site owners have demanded in total, $100 million for use of their land.

The IFRC decongested a refugee camp in Léogâne, creating a second one out of the overflow.

A second donors conference was announced for 31 March in New York City.

== 3 March 2010 ==
Operations at Jacmel Airport have decreased to 20–40 flights daily down from the high average of 80 daily.

Shaw Communications Inc. has announced a donation of $900,000 for Haiti quake relief.

Haiti has issued a request for aid from the Haitian diaspora.

== 4 March 2010 ==
Swiss-based Medair has started provided permanent shelters in Jacmel, that can evolved from metal-framed tents to metal clad sheds. With residents clearing their own lots, Medair would provide the shelter.

Residents of the Pinchinat tent city in Jacmel are receiving one meal a day.

== 5 March 2010 ==
Two Doctors Without Borders workers were kidnapped.

The last medical personnel of the Jamaican relief mission has left.

== 7 March 2010 ==
The Van Doos have started withdrawing from Haiti.

== 8 March 2010 ==
Charisa Coulter, Laura Silsby's second-in-command, was released from jail.

== 9 March 2010 ==
A CMAT medical team was rerouted from Chile to Haiti after it was determined that there was a lesser need in Chile.

The dockside Canadian walk-in medical clinic in Jacmel closed, after treating more than 10,000 patients.

== 10 March 2010 ==
USNS Comfort has ended its mission in the Joint Task Force Haiti area as part of Operation Unified Response, and is returning to its home port.

HMCS Athabaskan has ended its mission in Operation Hestia and is returning home to CFB Halifax.

== 11 March 2010 ==
RFA Largs Bay has been delivering aid and supplies to remote areas of Gonaïves.

The two kidnapped MSF workers have been released.

== 12 March 2010 ==
RFA Largs Bay arrived off the coast of Anse-à-Veau and made a large aid drop.

The Young Artists for Haiti music video for K'naan's "Wavin' Flag" premiered on MuchMusic, and became available for download. Proceeds from sales are to be contributed to Haiti relief through the Canadian Red Cross.

== 15 March 2010 ==
The Canadian military have already vacated Jacmel.

Some schools have reopened in Jacmel.

The Spanish frigate Álvaro de Bazán, delivers supplies and fresh personnel for Operation Hispaniola and Castilla.

== 16 March 2010 ==
The World Bank estimates that $11.5 billion over the next three years will be needed for reconstruction.

== 17 March 2010 ==
The children taken by Laura Silsby's group have been returned to their parents.

The UN Food and Agriculture Organization (FAO) has released an estimate that $800 million USD will be needed to revive the agriculture sector of the Haitian economy.

== 18 March 2010 ==
The last of the Jamaican military team left Haiti. This marks the departure of the last elements of CARICOM personnel.

== 22 March 2010 ==
DHL Express and the One Laptop per Child Foundation have combined to donate 2000 laptop computers for Haitian schools and their students to use. They are refurbished computers of the OLPC "XO" model.

== 24 March 2010 ==
2,200 US Marines, the 22MEU, and USS Bataan finished their tour, and have left Haiti.

Several British Columbia groups have combined together to donate several baby monitors and incubators for Haiti.

== 25 March 2010 ==
Tulane University is planning to set up a permanent clinic in Jacsonville, Haiti, where it currently operates an urgent care clinic. A permanent clinic by Tulane has been in the works since last year.

RFA Largs Bay has ended her mission and has left Haiti for the UK.

== 26 March 2010 ==
VANOC has donated the surplus medical and dental supplies from the 2010 Olympics and 2010 Paralympics for Haiti quake relief, approximately 900 kg worth.

== 15 May 2010 ==
After Haiti's 2010 earthquake, President Preval gave the Inter-American Development Bank (IDB) the mandate to work with the Education Ministry and the National Commission, preparing a major reform of the education system in a five-year plan.
