= ANGH =

ANGH may refer to:

- Association Nationale des Guides d'Haïti, the national Guiding organization of Haiti
- Ali Nawaz Ghoto Halt railway station (Pakistani station code ANGH)
- African Network in Global History, an affiliate of the World History Association
- Angh (film), a 2026 Indian drama film directed by Theja Rio
