= Scouting and Guiding in the Dominican Republic =

Scouting and Guiding movement in the Dominican Republic

The Scout and Guide movement in the Dominican Republic is served by two organisations:

- Asociación de Guías Scouts Dominicanas, member of the World Association of Girl Guides and Girl Scouts
- Asociación de Scouts Dominicanos, member of the World Organization of the Scout Movement

== International Scouting units in the Dominican Republic ==
In addition, there are American Boy Scouts in Santo Domingo, linked to the Direct Service branch of the Boy Scouts of America, which supports units around the world.
