= Felix Salmon =

British financial journalist

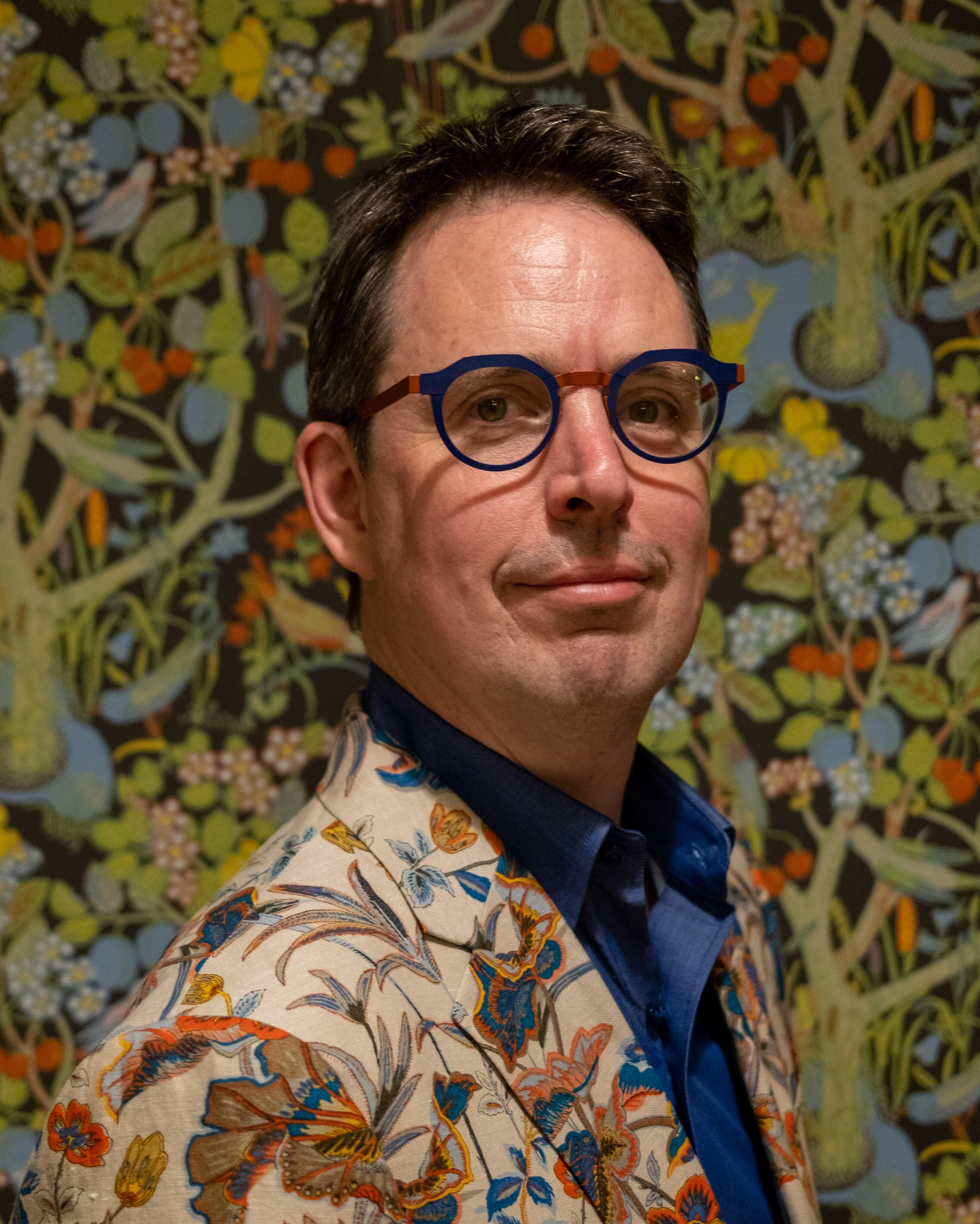
- Salmon in 2022
- Born: 1971 or 1972 (age 54–55); England
- Education: University of Glasgow
- Occupations: Writer, journalist

Felix Salmon (born 1972) is a British/American financial journalist, formerly of Portfolio Magazine and Euromoney and a former finance blogger for Reuters, where he analyzed economic and occasionally social issues in addition to financial commentary. In April 2014, Salmon left Reuters for a digital role at Fusion. In 2018, he joined Axios as chief financial correspondent. Salmon left Axios in May 2025, a change which he revealed in the Slate Money podcast episode of May 30, 2025, and began a new position writing for Bloomberg in September 2025.

Salmon also wrote a Wired cover story on the Gaussian copula, and has hosted Slate Money podcast since 2014.

== Early life ==
Salmon's ancestors include Jews who bore the surname Solomon before it was anglicized as Salmon. Salmon is a member of the Salmon & Gluckstein families who ran the Lyons teahouse and bakery chain in Britain. Salmon has an MA in art history from the University of Glasgow along with an Honours background in mathematics. He moved to the United States from the United Kingdom in 1997.

== Career ==
=== Journalism ===
Salmon began blogging in 1999 for the wire service Bridge News and later worked for economist Nouriel Roubini. The American Statistical Association presented Salmon with the 2010 Excellence in Statistical Reporting Award "for his body of work, which exemplifies the highest standards of scientific reporting. His insightful use of statistics as a tool to understanding the world of business and economics, areas that are critical in today's economy, sets a new standard in statistical investigative reporting."

Salmon published an article in Wired magazine on 27 December 2010 explaining high-frequency trading on Wall Street. This was followed by an interview on NPR which aired on 13 January 2011.

In September 2011, Salmon and Ryan McCarthy started "Counterparties," described as "essentially a link blog for financial news and commentary, offering a curated look at the moment’s big stories.

Salmon's work for Reuters earned him the 2012 Gerald Loeb Award for Blogging.

Since 10 May 2014, Salmon has hosted the weekly 'Slate Money' podcast along with regular Slate financial columnist Jordan Weissmann and financial blogger Cathy O'Neil, who left the program in 2017 and was replaced by Anna Szymanski, a former emerging markets risk analyst. As of 2023 his co-hosts include Emily Peck and Elizabeth Spiers.

In 2014, Salmon also joined Fusion, a combined TV channel / digital media outlet aimed at millennials, which was backed by Univision and Disney. Fusion was loosely managed and somewhat chaotic; Salmon produced "as far as anyone could tell, nothing in particular" in his time there. In 2016, Salmon's salary at Fusion was reported to be $400,000 after a clerical error at Fusion leaked it. He left Fusion in January 2018.

In 2018, Salmon began a weekly column for Axios called "Axios Edge", described as “a focus on market trends, business, and economics”.

=== Economic and financial commentary ===
During the 2008 financial crisis, Salmon argued that the CDO market could theoretically suffer a crisis as a result of subprime mortgage defaults cascading into defaults in the senior tranches of a CDO, and that such an occurrence could then result in a freeze in the credit markets. However, he denied that this eventuality could be predicted through a priori methods.

Salmon emphasizes financial deregulation, oversized financial conglomerates, excessive faith in financial models and efficiency of markets as well as regulatory incompetence as being major contributors to the 2008 financial crisis and the ensuing Great Recession.

Salmon's views on economic policies the government should take to solve the jobs crisis are ideologically in-line with those of the Keynesian resurgence. He is an advocate of further federal stimulus spending, arguing that America's economic institutions have failed to respond effectively to the crisis, and that the benefits of improving America's infrastructure and hiring public workers far outweigh the federal government's low borrowing costs during the euro area crisis.

Salmon has argued that no regulatory solution is capable of dealing with the societal risks posed by the too-big-to-fail banking conglomerates and extremely complex financial innovations of the modern market. He argues that real reform requires that the "financial behemoths" be broken up into much smaller pieces in order to reduce the incentive for – and ability of – financial institutions to "fraudulently game the system." However, he does not expect that this will occur anytime soon.

As Japan copes with the aftermath of the earthquake in Tōhoku, he advised against donating money to single-emergency or developing country-based NGOs because of perceived logistical issues during the 2010 Haiti relief efforts, instead arguing that Médecins Sans Frontières, Save the Children, the Red Cross and public-sector solutions would be more effective.

His commentary on the long-running sovereign debt dispute between Elliott Management Corporation and the government of Argentina was featured on a 2014 episode of Last Week Tonight with John Oliver.

In 2021, Salmon published an article alleging that $400 billion in unemployment benefits had been fraudulently claimed during the COVID-19 pandemic, a claim provided only by a fraud prevention service company that contracts with state governments to prevent such fraud. A wide variety of journalists and commenters criticized Salmon for a lack of journalistic ethics and rigor for publishing such a bold and uncorroborated claim.
