= Olympification =

Olympification refers to the modifications and lasting impacts of planning for the Olympics on a host city’s infrastructure. These modifications are put in place to glorify the host city and mask anything undesirable through "clean the streets" initiatives. Olympification can explain both revitalization efforts and the disadvantages of urban renewal. As seen in multiple Olympics, revitalization efforts attract the attention of middle and upper-class residents at the expense of poor and working-class.

== Depictions in previous Olympics ==
=== Atlanta 1996 ===
One of the first known uses in academic literature of the term Olympification was in The Legend of the Black Mecca: Politics and Class in the Making of Modern Atlanta. The text uses the term to explain the outcome of disregard for the poor and working-class residents of Atlanta during the planning for the 1996 Summer Olympics.

When Atlanta received the Olympic bid, over 9,000 homeless people were arrested, 30,000 low-income families were displaced, cost of living significantly increased, and over 1,000 households received evictions. In the midst of a public housing crisis in the 1980s, developers decided that the land current public housing sat on wasn't viable and could be used for athlete housing. This housing would eventually become marketed towards middle-income families and college students, further displacing poor and homeless inhabitants. Other actions done to remove homeless people from Atlanta include the gentrification of a park known for the homeless to gather, benches engineered to prevent sleeping on them, and lack of accessible utilities. These actions from policy leaders disproportionately targeted and affected poor and working class Black citizens of Atlanta.

=== Vancouver 2010 ===
In preparation for the 2010 Olympics, the Vancouver Organizing Committee (VANOC) announced that it would create sustainable and permanent housing for its residents. A couple of years before the games, the Impacts of the Olympics on Community Coalition (IOCC) notified VANOC that they were significantly lacking legacy housing for their citizens, which could later result in displacement. In response, VANOC created temporary homeless shelters located in areas that conceal the city’s poverty from tourists. They also increased rent for current residents and issued illegal evictions. Although the Olympic Village was converted into housing, rent and utility increases forced low-income tenants out of their homes. Since the city of Vancouver owned the property, it was also difficult for tenants to communicate their grievances. Despite initiatives to eradicate homelessness, homelessness has increased since the Olympics, with the population of homeless youth nearly doubling 4 years later.

=== London 2012 ===
The principal strategy used to prepare for the 2012 Olympics was regeneration. Some regeneration projects included renovating neighborhoods, elevating the job market, and providing affordable housing. In terms of expanding housing availability, plans would not last as houses built would result in the displacement of poor families and later be geared towards middle-class families. In Stratford, the rise of investment into private rental properties led very minimal options for poor and low-income families. Developers and investors did not want to in affordable housing and instead supported increasing the rent of their properties. This along with post-Olympic policy shifts, overcrowding, and failed revitalization efforts has led to the decrease in options of social rental housing.
