= 5 Service Battalion =

- Active: 1 September 1968 – present
- Country: Canada
- Branch: Canadian Army
- Role: Combat Service Support
- Size: One Battalion of Four Companies
- Part of: 5 Canadian Mechanized Brigade Group
- Garrison/HQ: CFB Valcartier
- Motto: Devoir avant tout (Duty Above All)
- Colors: Marine Corps Scarlet, Oriental Blue, Gold
- March: "Marche de l'intendant"
- Website: http://www.army-armee.forces.gc.ca/en/5-bataillon-service/index.page?

Insignia
- Abbreviation: 5 Svc Bn, 5 Bon Svc

5 Service Battalion (5 Svc Bn), or 5^{e} Bataillon des services (5 Bon Svc) in French, is a deployable field unit of the Canadian Forces. It provides second and limited third line Combat Service Support to units throughout 2nd Canadian Division (2 CA Div). Located at CFB Valcartier, 5 Svc Bn is composed of a battalion headquarters and four functional companies: Transportation, Supply, Maintenance, and Administration. Administration Company is unique in that it provides first line support to the battalion itself, while the remaining companies provide second and limited third line support to units across 2 CA Div.

5 Svc Bn generates Forward Support Groups (FSGs) formed of personnel from each company in order to support domestic and international operations. 5 Svc Bn is a robust force generation unit that is capable of providing two company sized FSGs to support operations at any given time. 5 Svc Bn also has the temporary mandate to generate the Decontamination Company for the Canadian Forces.

The battalion is composed of an integrated and cohesive team of active military members and public servants. Soldiers must maintain their soldiering and war-fighting skills to a high degree of proficiency, while concurrently developing expertise in their respective trades.

The battalion's primary focus is on conducting and training for operations; however, the unit also provides combat service support on a daily basis to 5 CMBG and 2 CA Div. 5 Svc Bn has, over the past two decades, regularly generated, trained, and deployed the National Support Element (NSE) for several Canadian deployments.

The unit motto is Devoir avant tout which translates to Duty Above All.

== History ==
5 Service Battalion (5 Svc Bn) was officially formed on 1 September 1968, however, the unit's roots can be traced back to around the start of World War I through the history of its functional companies: Transportation, Supply and Maintenance. These three companies are descendants of the Royal Canadian Army Service Corps (RCASC), the Royal Canadian Ordnance Corps (RCOC), and the Royal Canadian Electrical and Mechanical Engineers (RCEME) respectively.

=== The Royal Canadian Army Service Corps ===
Until the formation of the Service Battalions in September 1968, all transportation service was provided by the Royal Canadian Army Service Corps. The RCASC was established, by General Order No. 141, as the Canadian Army Service Corps (CASC), on November 1, 1901. The CASC was modelled directly off the British Army Service Corps to provide all transportation and supply services to the Army. Initially, the CASC consisted of four companies to support the Active Militia units. The Corps grew quickly, doubling the number of units by 1903, and growing by another three companies by 1905. By the summer of 1914 the CASC had a strength of 3000 personnel in eighteen companies.

During World War I, the CASC provided a support element for each Canadian Division, and later on, for the Canadian Corps. With the introduction of motorized vehicles, the CASC carried commodities of a greater range and of greater weights. Motorized transportation also resulted in expanded responsibilities such as driving ambulances and engineer pontoon vehicles, carrying all natures of ammunition, and mobile repair and recovery. In recognition of the services rendered during World War I, His Majesty King George V authorized the designator "Royal" in 1919.

The RCASC, along with the rest of the Army, underwent a rapid expansion as Canada mobilized for the Second World War. The RCASC provided support to Canadian soldiers wherever they went; training in Canada and Great Britain, the campaign in north-west Europe, and in the campaign in Italy. The RCASC moved supplies from the rear areas to the front-lines. They delivered all rations, ammunition, petroleum products, and all other essentials. They did so with a variety of vehicles ranging from three to ten ton trucks, and forty ton tank transporters.

=== The Royal Canadian Ordnance Corps ===
The Royal Canadian Ordnance Corps RCOC can trace its roots back to the Canadian Stores Department. Formed in 1871, the Canadian Stores Department was a civil department of the Canadian Government. This civil service was charged with control of forts, ammunition, stores, buildings and an ordnance depot left by the departing British Military. On July 1, 1903, the responsibilities of the Canadian Stores Department were transferred to the Ordnance Stores Corps. In 1907 it was renamed the Canadian Ordnance Corps (COC).

During the First World War, the COC, in conjunction with the CASC, was supporting 400,000 men, 150,000 French civilians, and 25,000 horses. In 1919, for recognition of outstanding service during the War, King George V authorized the "Royal" designation.

In the Second World War, the RCOC had a strength of 35,000 military personnel, not including the thousands of civilian personnel employed at RCOC installations. They procured all the material goods required by the Army, from clothing to weapons. Up until 1944, the RCOC was responsible for maintenance and repair. Ordnance Field Parks, that carried everything from spare parts to spare artillery, supported the Divisions and Corps.

=== The Royal Canadian Electrical and Mechanical Engineers ===
The Corps of RCEME was formed on 15 May 1944 as an amalgamation of elements of the RCOC, the RCASC, and the Royal Canadian Engineers. It was modeled after the British Royal Electrical and Mechanical Engineers (REME). It was born out of lessons learned during the Second World War. It became apparent that due to the increasing complexity of military equipment, technical expertise needed to be pooled to be most effective.

=== Current Order of Battle ===
The Unit Headquarters is responsible for command and control of the unit, planning and coordinating support operations and training, issuing direction to the companies, and maintaining liaison with supported and supporting organizations. The unit headquarters includes an Operations cell, Training cell, Battalion Orderly Room, and the command team of the Commanding Officer, the Regimental Sergeant Major, the Deputy Commanding Officer, the Adjutant and the Battalion Administration Coordinator.

Transportation Company is responsible to provide second and limited third line transport, and movements support. The second largest company, it is organized into four platoons: Headquarters Platoon, Field Platoon, Charlie Platoon, and Movements and Postal Platoon. Support tasks executed by the company include the provision of the general cargo and personal transport, refueling services, snow and ice control operations at CFB Valcartier, multi-modal movements planning and control, aerial re-supply and postal services.

Supply Company is the third largest company in the battalion. The company is organized with a headquarters and five platoons: The Systems Control Platoon, Stocks Platoon, Garrison Support Services Platoon, Laundry, Bath, and Decontamination Platoon, and Combat Supply Platoon. Supply Company provides a variety of essential stores and services to supported units both in garrison and while on deployed operations.

Maintenance Company is the largest of the companies in the battalion. The company provides second and limited third line repair and recovery services to assigned dependencies both in garrison and on deployments, as well as providing integral-level support to specified units that do not possess their own integral Land Equipment Management System resources. Maintenance Company consists of a Headquarters, Vehicle Platoon, Artisan Platoon, and Garrison Maintenance Platoon.

Administration Company is the smallest in the battalion and is composed of a Headquarters Platoon, Maintenance Platoon, Transport Platoon, Quarter Master Platoon, Signals Troop, and Finance Platoon. The role of Administration Company is to provide efficient and effective first line support to the other companies of 5 Svc Bn and any external elements that are attached to the unit. This includes the provision of transportation, maintenance, supply, signals, administrative, and food services support that the members of the other companies need in order to successfully carry out their assigned tasks.

== Deployed operations ==
=== International ===
- Operation Hestia - Haiti (2010)
- Operation ARCHER - Afghanistan (2005-)
- Operation ATHENA - Afghanistan (2005-)
- Operation APOLLO - Afghanistan (2001–2003)
- Operation PALLADIUM - Bosnia (1995–2004)
- Operation MANDARIN - Croatia (1994)
- Operation HARMONY - Croatia (1992–1995)
- Operation DANACA - Middle East (1974–2006)
- Operation SNOWGOOSE - Cyprus (1964–1993)

=== Domestic ===
- Operation LOTUS - Richelieu River Floods (May 2011)
- Operation PODIUM – Winter Olympic Games in Vancouver, B.C. (Winter 2010)
- Operation GRIZZLY - G8 Leaders Summit in Kananaskis, Alberta (Summer 2002)
- Operation Recuperation - Ice storm relief in eastern Canada (Jan-Feb 1998)
