= Operation Halo =

Operation Halo was the Canadian Forces contribution of 500 personnel and 6 CH-146 Griffon helicopters to Haiti in March 2004 as part of the United Nations Stabilization Mission in Haiti to assist in stabilizing the country following February's 2004 Haitian coup d'état. Though originally mandated for a total of 90 days, the operation was extended at the request of the United Nations until July 2004 and the Canadian forces returned home in August.

The task force was composed of the 2nd Battalion, The Royal Canadian Regiment from CFB Gagetown, the Canadian Forces Joint Operations Group from CFB Kingston, and 430 Tactical Helicopter Squadron from CFB Valcartier.

CC-130 Hercules and CC-150 Polaris aircraft based at 8 Wing Trenton provided airlift support for the deployment.

== See also ==
- Operation Hestia
- List of Canadian peacekeeping missions
