= Vancouver Organizing Committee for the 2010 Olympic and Paralympic Winter Games =

Organization

- Formation: 30 September 2003
- Headquarters: Vancouver, British Columbia
- Official language: English, French
- Chief Executive Officer: John Furlong
- Website: vancouver2010.com (archived)

The Vancouver Organizing Committee for the 2010 Olympic and Paralympic Winter Games (VANOC) (French: Comité d’organisation des Jeux olympiques et paralympiques d’hiver de 2010 à Vancouver - COVAN) was the non-profit organization responsible for planning, organizing, financing and staging the 2010 Winter Olympics and 2010 Winter Paralympics. Established on September 30, 2003, about four months after the 2010 games were awarded to Vancouver, British Columbia, it performed these roles with "the mandate to support and promote the development of sport in Canada."

VANOC was led by chief executive officer John Furlong, an Irish-born long-time member of the Canadian Olympic Committee. Its board of directors consisted of 20 members, with seven chosen by the Canadian Olympic Committee, one from the Canadian Paralympic Committee, three each from Canadian and British Columbian provincial governments, two from the City government of Vancouver, two from the Resort Municipality of Whistler, one chosen jointly by the Band Councils of the Lil'wat and Squamish Nations, and a final director chosen by the other 19 members.

== Goals ==
On January 30, 2009, VANOC announced its updated budget for the 2010 games. The operating budget was set at CAN$1.76 billion, with a contingency of $77 million. This reflected an increase of $130 million over the $1.63 billion operating budget announced in May 2007, though VANOC said that if the accounting principles applied for the 2009 budget were retroactively applied to the May 2007 budget, the operating budget would have remained "relatively unchanged." The VANOC operating budget was financed by private sector sources such as sponsorships, licensing, merchandising, ticket sales and fundraising, as well as with a contribution from the International Olympic Committee; it was separate from the CAN$580 million spent on venue construction, costs for which were shared equally by the government of Canada and the provincial government of British Columbia.

One of VANOC's goals was to achieve "unprecedented" First Nations, Inuit, and Métis participation in the planning and hosting of the 2010 Winter Games.

VANOC also sought to place a broader emphasis on sustainability, integrating it into purchasing and daily operations and expanding to include "social and economic dimensions", such as an effort to include "inner-city residents and businesses in the economic opportunities."

== Site preparation ==
VANOC spent $16.6 million to upgrade facilities at Cypress Mountain, where the freestyle (aerials, moguls, ski cross) and snowboarding events were held. With the opening in February 2009 of the $40-million Vancouver Olympic/Paralympic Centre at Hillcrest Park, every sports venue for the 2010 games was completed on time and about a year prior to the start of the games.

The Vancouver Games were the first to officially integrate social media into their official communication channels and strategies. Olympic social media "firsts" include: the first official Facebook presence (1.1M fans), the first Games tweeted by an Organizing Committee, the first Games to produce a daily series of videos on YouTube during the Games, the first Official Mobile App (over 1M downloads from over 50 countries), and the first to host audio and video podcasts on iTunes.

== After the Games ==
VANOC donated the surplus medical and dental supplies from the 2010 Olympics and 2010 Paralympics for Haiti earthquake relief through Canadian Forces' Operation Hestia, approximately 900 kg worth. VANOC ceased operations on December 31, 2010, 10 months after the end of the Paralympic Games.

After VANOC submitted their report to the International Olympic Committee, VANOC was officially dissolved on June 27, 2014.
