= Scouts d'Haïti =

National Scouting organisation of Haiti

- Founded: 1940
- Membership: 43,618
- President: Emmanuel Joseph Eric Jr Lamothe
- General Commissioner: Yvon Adolphe
- International Commissioner: David Tilus
- Affiliation: World Organization of the Scout Movement
- Website www.scoutsdhaiti.org

The Association Nationale des Scouts d'Haïti (ANSH, National Association of the Scouts of Haiti; in Haitian Creole: Asosyasyon nasyonal eskout dayiti) is the national Scouting organisation of Haiti. Scouting in Haiti started in 1916 and became a member of the World Organization of the Scout Movement (WOSM) in 1932 and again in 1940. The coeducational association has 43,618 members (as of 2011).

The Scout Motto is Sois Prêt (Be Prepared) in French.

== Programs ==
Besides the traditional Scouting program, the ANSH is engaged in the development of the country. Fields of work are

- fighting illiteracy
- reforestation
- environmental protection
- evening-schools
- international exchanges
- services to the community
- AIDS prevention

== Age groups ==
The association is divided in four age-groups:

- Tout-petits (ages 3 to 7)
- Lovetaux (ages 8 to 11)
- Scouts (ages 11 to 17)
- Routiers (ages 17 to 23)

== History ==
=== Origin ===
The first Scout groups in Haiti began their work in 1916 and formed an association in 1926. In 1932, this association became a member of WOSM, but membership was cancelled in 1939. In 1940, a new association, the Association Nationale des Scouts d'Haïti, was created and was recognized by WOSM that same year. In 1962, Haiti became the first country to issue a postage stamp featuring Lady Baden-Powell.

=== 2004 Hurricane Jeanne ===
After Hurricane Jeanne in 2004, the association helped with the reconstruction of Gonaïves. They were supported through donations by the worldwide community of Scouts, especially by the Scouts de France.

=== 2010 Haiti earthquake response ===
On January 13, 2010, the Asociacion de Scouts Dominicanos organized Scout Solidarity with Haiti to support Scouts d'Haïti after the 2010 Haiti earthquake.

The Asociacion de Scouts Dominicanos have made several deliveries of food, water, tents and tools for the Scouts of Haiti, to support its operations; it is the only tangible aid has been delivered to the Scouts of Haiti from any Scout organization. They are promoting international support for operations of the Scouts of Haiti.

On January 15, 2010 the World Organization of the Scout Movement organized Solidarity with Haiti to support Scouts d'Haïti after the 2010 Haiti earthquake.

The World Scout Bureau has been successful in contacting the representatives of the Scouts d'Haïti. Hundreds of Scouts visited the association's president, Gerard-Marie Tardieu, regularly, either to offer their assistance or to accept rescue missions.

The Scouts of Jacmel have helped the firefighters to find and rescue those trapped under rubble, and in the distribution of food and water to the victims.

The Scouts of Léogâne have helped in the distribution of food and water.

The Scouts of Saint-Marc have put in place a makeshift clinic that provides primary care to the injured coming from Port-au-Prince.

The Scouts of the Saint-Georges and Caleb groups have helped over 2000 to reach the borders of the Dominican Republic in their personal cars so that the wounded may be treated. Through local committees, the two groups have been able to provide many with food and shelter in their own homes.

The Scouts of the Gideon de Carrefour group have pulled out about 300 cadavers from under the debris and saved about 725, have fabricated coffins for the dozen Scouts who died, and they have dug a communal trench to bury 150 of the dead.

A mission for the evaluation of the International Scout Aid left Paris to assess and readapt the plan of action designed to the needs of the situation. The mission consists of a volunteer member of the Scouts et Guides de France, a journalist from the French magazine La Vie Parisienne, and will be supported by the representative of the Movimiento Scout Católico of Spain. WOSM is also in collaboration with the United Nations High Commissioner for Refugees and UNICEF.

Executive Committee of Scouts d'Haïti
Position	Name
President	Emmanuel Joseph Eric Jr Lamothe
General Commissioner	Yvon Adolphe
Deputy Commissioner General	Francius Dauphin Estimable
Secretary General	Johnny Elicin
Deputy Secretary General	Ophenie Succès
Treasurer General	Maxeau Édouard
Deputy Treasurer General	Jephté Mazile
International Commissioner	David Tilus
Deputy International Commissioner	Junior Mercier
Legal Advisor	Esther Chery
National Youth Advisor	Jefferson Laurent

== See also ==
- Association Nationale des Guides d'Haïti
