= Association Nationale des Guides d'Haïti =

Scouting organization

- National Guide Association of Haïti
- Country: Haiti
- Founded: 1942
- Membership: 782
- Affiliation: World Association of Girl Guides and Girl Scouts

The Association Nationale des Guides d'Haïti (ANGH; National Guide Association of Haïti) is the national Guiding organization of Haiti. It serves 782 members (as of 2003). Founded in 1942, the girls-only organization became an associate member of the World Association of Girl Guides and Girl Scouts in 1946 and a full member in 1950. In 1962, Haiti became the first country to issue a postage stamp featuring Lady Baden-Powell.

== Program ==
The association is divided in four sections according to age:

- Jeanette - ages 7 to 12
- Guide - ages 12 to 15
- Guide relais - ages 15 to 18
- Guide aînée - ages 18 to 25

=== 2010 Haiti earthquake response ===
News from the Association Nationale des Guides d'Haïti is sparse after the 2010 Haiti earthquake, with International Commissioner Leticia Cadet confirming that she and the Guides she is in contact with are safe and "trying to help as much as we can." Guides were noted by CNN in an article to be assisting with distributing aid in Léogâne.

Neighboring Asociación de Guías Scouts Dominicanas has set up a working group to mobilize its members and their communities and to coordinate their aid effort. Les Scouts et Guides de France has established a fund to raise money for food, infrastructure and other essential requirements.

The 2010 World Thinking Day Fund, in which WAGGGS is focusing on five specific countries, Haiti, Georgia, Maldives, Sudan and Zimbabwe, supports the work of WAGGGS globally. It is not exclusively dedicated to Haiti or disaster relief, however, part of the funding raised will go to Haiti in 2010 and specific projects agreed upon by Haiti and WAGGGS. As the World Association of Girl Guides and Girl Scouts is not an expert disaster relief agency or disaster fund co-ordinator, WAGGGS is not setting up a special fund for Haiti.

There are also projects of national Scout organizations to support the help of the World Organization of the Scout Movement and WAGGGS, such as Austria.

== See also ==
- Scouts d'Haïti
