= Operation Hestia =

Canadian humanitarian response

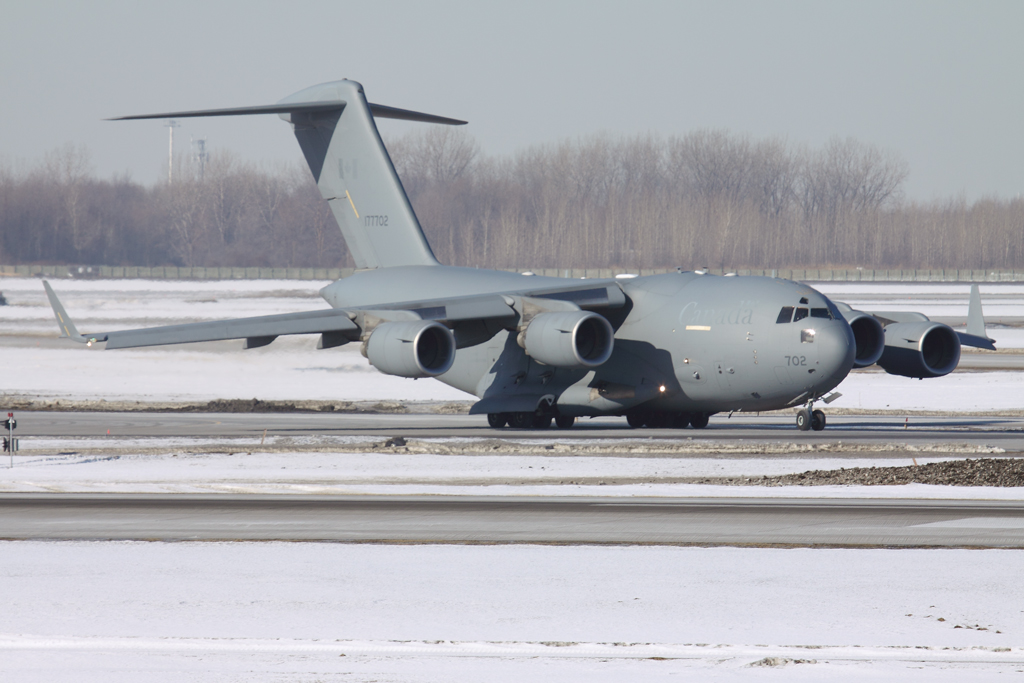
CC-177 departing from Montreal International Airport after having repatriated Haitian Canadians

Operation Hestia is the name of the Canadian Forces humanitarian response to the 2010 Haiti earthquake which struck Haiti on 12 January 2010. Operation Hestia is the military component of an interagency response that also involves Foreign Affairs and International Trade Canada (DFAIT) and the Canadian International Development Agency (CIDA). The headquarters for Operation Hestia were established in the city of Jacmel.

== Force composition ==
The Canadian Forces deployed approximately 2,000 personnel, including the Air Component under the Command of Colonel Scott Clancy, and with a Naval Task Group from CFB Halifax, Nova Scotia, under the command of Maritime Command Captain Art McDonald, comprising:

- the destroyer HMCS Athabaskan, carrying a CH-124 Sea King
- the frigate HMCS Halifax;
- four CH-146 Griffon helicopters from 1 Wing Kingston squadrons;
- two CH-146 Griffon helicopters from 424 Squadron, 8 Wing Trenton;
- a CC-177 Globemaster;
- a CC-130 Hercules for airlift support;
- the Disaster Assistance Response Team with three reverse osmosis water purification units;
- an urban rescue and recovery team made up of search-and-rescue technicians and firefighters from across Canada;
- a detachment of military police; and
- a Land Force group drawn mostly from Canadian Forces Base Valcartier in Quebec, mainly due to French-speaking Haiti, comprising:
  - the Task Force Headquarters, including the Task Force Commander's staff;
  - a signals squadron,
  - a light infantry battalion drawn from the 3rd Battalion, Royal 22^{e} Régiment, with two rifle companies, one service support company, one headquarters company, and a field engineer element; plus
  - a Joint Task Force Support Element, drawn primarily from 5 Service Battalion, offering combat service support, Military Police and construction engineering support.

The battalion of the Royal 22^{e} Régiment deployed to Haiti can only remain on station until late-March, as they will need to deploy to California, for training, prior to deployment to Afghanistan.

Withdrawal is expected to be complete by April.

== Mission timeline ==
Athabaskan was deployed to the city of Léogâne and Halifax was deployed to the city of Jacmel (Governor-General Michaëlle Jean's hometown), arriving at their respective locations off Haiti on 18 January 2010. Both naval vessels deployed their ship's companies as light engineering platoons, with the use of light equipment such as chainsaws, for relief operations in Haiti. They comprised approximately 500 sailors, and the ship's boarding parties were tasked with providing security to the sailors on shore. Athabaskan and Halifax had departed CFB Halifax for Haiti on 14 January 2010. Relief flights using CC-130 Hercules into Jacmel Airport started on 19 January, after having previously been scouted by CH-146 Griffons on 14 January. The identification of Jacmel Airport as a possible site for use and the decision to use Jacmel was made by Major-General Yvan Blondin.

8 Air Communications and Control Squadron installed runway lighting on 19 January at Jacmel Airport, enabling aircraft to land at night, with radar control of the airspace provided by the nearby HMCS Halifax. Opening the Jacmel airfield 24 hours-a-day was intended to help relieve congestion at Toussaint L'Ouverture International Airport in Port-au-Prince.

As of 20 January 2010, 1,504 people were evacuated from Haiti to Canada on 17 flights. 1,727 Canadians have been located while 479 were still unaccounted for.

On 22 January, the DART facility in Jacmel moved from next to the Saint-Michel Hospital to the harbour. The DART field hospital was set up on the pier and was operating at capacity. The DART's Reverse Osmosis Water Purification Unit, which produces potable water from whatever source is available, including sea water, was set up on a jetty in Jacmel. Air traffic control was established at Jacmel Airport and, as of 22 January, the airport could accommodate a mix of 160 military and civilian fixed-wing and helicopter flights a day. The 1st Canadian Field Hospital was deployed to Léogâne. The Van Doos have been deployed to Léogâne, to help with recovery efforts.

As of 24 January in Jacmel, the organization of refugee camps continued, with the start of construction of proper latrines. Food distribution was being delivered by the UN, with Canadian soldiers providing security, and Haitian Girl Guides and Boy Scouts handling crowd control and organization. Canadian military firefighters were inspecting buildings in Jacmel to ascertain which were structurally sound and usable. A Canadian military clinic had been set up on the beach, with the Forces also establishing a tent city for those residents who had lost their homes. Canadian soldiers were providing security for food distribution points in Léogâne.

On 28 January, Jacmel's first post-quake baby was born at the DART clinic. Late in January, plans were made with the U.S. to shift military flights from Toussaint L'Ouverture International Airport in Port-au-Prince to Jacmel Airport, to allow civilian flights into the capital's airport. It was expected that approximately 100 flights would be shifted to Jacmel. Canadian Forces were preparing for the increase in traffic, and were already dealing with degradation of the airstrip surface due to its current overuse. The Canadian Forces also started to monitor Jacmel-area orphanages to help protect against orphan-trafficking.

After three weeks of operations, the Canadian Forces were "everywhere" in the Leogane-Jacmel Corridor.

On 19 February, HMCS Halifax finished its operational tour, and left Jacmel. As of 22 February, military evacuation flights ended, Canadians that desired to leave were required to depart via commercial flights via Port-au-Prince International Airport, which had resumed operations. Over 4600 Canadians were evacuated on 48 flights. 50 Canadians were still listed as missing, while 34 were confirmed as killed. 1,681 members of the Canadian Forces remained in Haiti. On 22 February, Foreign Affairs Minister Lawrence Cannon announced the start of a progressive drawdown of deployed Canadian Forces in Haiti.

On 2 March, HMCS Halifax returned to CFB Halifax. On 5 March, it was announced that the 850 soldiers from CFB Valcartier of Joint Task Force Haiti (JTF Haiti, JTFH) would start gradually returning. As of 7 March 90 members of the Van Doos had returned home. It was announced that HMCS Athabaskan would end its mission on 10 March. On 9 March, the Jacmel dockside Canadian walk-in medical clinic closed, after treating more than 10,000 patients. As of 16 March, the Canadian military vacated Jacmel. Athabaskan returned to CFB Halifax on 17 March 2010.

On 1 April 2010, the Joint Task Force Support Element closed the mission and the last remaining Canadian military forces left the theatre from the Port-au-Prince International Airport.

== Reactions ==
After a fortnight of operations, a survey showed significant approval of the operation as a fitting Canadian response. The UN also expressed approval of the mission by Canada, but stated that the Canadian troops would not stay long. After three weeks of operations, the Haitians of Jacmel were happy with the help the Canadian Forces were providing. After five weeks, morale was high amongst Canadian Forces personnel deployed to Haiti. After two months, the Haitian government expressed its gratitude for Canada's help.

Many groups charge that the Canadian Forces departed Jacmel abruptly, leaving it in no condition to continue on as a receiving and distribution hub. After the pullout, the airport could no longer process international flights, as no equipment remained to operate the control tower, nor heavy equipment to process the planes, or security to police supplies at the airport. The seaport was left without heavy equipment to handle cargo on ships, and without security to secure the port.

An internal governmental report on the operation after its conclusion noted that the DART team was not given priority in aid flights, and were left without equipment supplies or security that it needed to function at full capacity. It further stated that various media groups and special interest groups were bumping supplies and personnel for the operation off the flights into Haiti from Canada. Other less critical supplies from aid groups were bumping critical supplies and equipment. It also noted that although DART should be at full readiness, all the time, it was given byes on preparedness.

== See also ==
- Canadian Expeditionary Force Command
- Canada's humanitarian response to the 2010 Haiti earthquake
- Jacmel Airport
- Opération Séisme Haiti 2010, the French military's counterpart
- Operation Unified Response, the United States military's counterpart
- Operation Halo, a 2004 Canadian Forces mission to Haiti
