= HMCS Halifax (FFH 330) =

Royal Canadian Navy frigate

- HMCS Halifax en route to Haiti in January 2010 as part of Operation Hestia

History

Canada
- Name: Halifax
- Namesake: Halifax, Nova Scotia
- Builder: Saint John Shipbuilding Ltd., Saint John
- Laid down: 19 March 1987
- Launched: 30 April 1988
- Commissioned: 29 June 1992
- Refit: HCM/FELEX September 2010 – September 2011
- Home port: CFB Halifax
- Identification: MMSI number: 316138000; Callsign: CGAP
- Motto: Sior gaisgiel (ever brave/bravery endures)
- Honours and awards: Atlantic 1942–45, Arabian Sea
- Status: in active service
- Badge: Argent a kingfisher holding a trident in bend points upward Or.

General characteristics
- Class & type: Halifax-class frigate
- Displacement: 3,995 tonnes (light); 4,795 tonnes (operational); 5,032 tonnes (deep load)
- Length: 134.2 m (440 ft)
- Beam: 16.5 m (54 ft)
- Draught: 7.1 m (23 ft)
- Propulsion: 2 × LM2500 Gas turbines; 1 × SEMT Pielstick Diesel engine
- Speed: 30 knots (56 km/h; 35 mph)
- Range: 9,500 nautical miles (17,600 km)
- Complement: 255 (including air detachment)
- Armament: 24 × Honeywell Mk 46 torpedoes; 16 × Evolved Sea-Sparrow SAM; 8 × RGM-84 Harpoon SSM; 1 × 57 mm Bofors Mk2 gun; 1 × 20 mm Vulcan Phalanx CIWS; 6 × .50 caliber machine guns
- Aircraft carried: 1 × CH-148 Cyclone

HMCS Halifax (FFH 330) is a Halifax-class frigate that has served in the Royal Canadian Navy and Canadian Forces since 1992. Halifax is the lead ship in her class which is the name for the Canadian Patrol Frigate Project. She is the second vessel to carry the designation HMCS Halifax. She carries the hull classification symbol FFH 330.

She is assigned to Maritime Forces Atlantic (MARLANT) and is homeported at CFB Halifax in her namesake city, Halifax, Nova Scotia, a name that was also borne by HMCS Halifax (K237), a Flower-class corvette during the Second World War as well as the first warship built in Halifax, HMS Halifax (1768).

== Description and design ==
The Halifax-class frigate design of which Halifax belongs, was ordered by the Canadian Forces in 1977 as a replacement for the aging St. Laurent, Restigouche, Mackenzie, and Annapolis classes of destroyer escorts, which were all tasked with anti-submarine warfare. In July 1983, the federal government approved the budget for the design and construction of the first batch of six new frigates of which Halifax was a part, out of twelve that were eventually built. To reflect the changing long-term strategy of the Navy during the 1980s and 1990s, the Halifax-class frigates was designed as a general purpose warship with particular focus on anti-submarine capabilities.

As built, the Halifax-class vessels displaced 4,750 long tons (4,830 t) and were 134.65 metres (441 ft 9 in) long overall and 124.49 metres (408 ft 5 in) between perpendiculars with a beam of 16.36 metres (53 ft 8 in) and a draught of 4.98 metres (16 ft 4 in). That made them slightly larger than the Iroquois-class destroyers. The vessels are propelled by two shafts with Escher Wyss controllable pitch propellers driven by a CODOG system of two General Electric LM2500 gas turbines, generating 47,500 shaft horsepower (35,400 kW) and one SEMT Pielstick 20 PA6 V 280 diesel engine, generating 8,800 shaft horsepower (6,600 kW).

This gives the frigates a maximum speed of 29 knots (54 km/h; 33 mph) and a range of 7,000 nautical miles (13,000 km; 8,100 mi) at 15 knots (28 km/h; 17 mph) while using their diesel engines. Using their gas turbines, the ships have a range of 3,930 nautical miles (7,280 km; 4,520 mi) at 18 knots (33 km/h; 21 mph). The Halifax class have a complement of 198 naval personnel of which 17 are officers and 17 aircrew of which 8 are officers.

=== Armament and aircraft ===
As built the Halifax-class vessels deployed the CH-124 Sea King helicopter, which acted in concert with shipboard sensors to seek out and destroy submarines at long distances from the ships. The ships have a helicopter deck fitted with a "bear trap" system allowing the launch and recovery of helicopters in up to sea state 6. The Halifax class also carries a close-in anti-submarine weapon in the form of the Mark 46 torpedo, launched from twin Mark 32 Mod 9 torpedo tubes in launcher compartments either side of the forward end of the helicopter hangar.

As built, the anti-shipping role is supported by the RGM-84 Harpoon Block 1C surface-to-surface missile, mounted in two quadruple launch tubes at the main deck level between the funnel and the helicopter hangar. For anti-aircraft self-defence the ships are armed with the Sea Sparrow vertical launch surface-to-air missile in two Mk 48 Mod 0 eight-cell launchers placed to port and starboard of the funnel. The vessels carry 16 missiles. A Raytheon/General Dynamics Phalanx Mark 15 Mod 21 Close-In Weapon System (CIWS) is mounted on top of the helicopter hangar for "last-ditch" defence against targets that evade the Sea Sparrow.

As built, the main gun on the forecastle is a 57 mm (2.2 in)/70 calibre Mark 2 gun from Bofors. (Note: The 70 calibre denotes the length of the gun. This means that the length of the gun barrel is 70 times the bore diameter.) The gun is capable of firing 2.4-kilogram (5.3 lb) shells at a rate of 220 rounds per minute at a range of more than 17 kilometres (11 mi).

=== Countermeasures and sensors ===
As built, the decoy system comprises two BAE Systems Shield Mark 2 decoy launchers which fire chaff to 2 kilometres (1.2 mi) and infrared rockets to 169 metres (185 yd) in distraction, confusion and centroid seduction modes. The torpedo decoy is the AN/SLQ-25A Nixie towed acoustic decoy from Argon ST. The ship's radar warning receiver, the CANEWS (Canadian Electronic Warfare System), SLQ-501, and the radar jammer, SLQ-505, were developed by Thorn and Lockheed Martin Canada.

Two Thales Nederland (formerly Signaal) SPG-503 (STIR 1.8) fire control radars are installed one on the roof of the bridge and one on the raised radar platform immediately forward of the helicopter hangar. The ship is also fitted with Raytheon AN/SPS-49(V)5 long-range active air search radar operating at C and D bands, Ericsson HC150 Sea Giraffe medium-range air and surface search radar operating at G and H bands, and Kelvin Hughes Type 1007 I-band navigation radar. The sonar suite includes the CANTASS Canadian Towed Array and GD-C AN/SQS-510 hull mounted sonar and incorporates an acoustic range prediction system. The sonobuoy processing system is the GD-C AN/UYS-503.

=== Modernization ===
The Halifax class underwent a modernization program, known as the Halifax Class Modernization (HCM) program, in order to update the frigates' capabilities in combatting modern smaller, faster and more mobile threats. This involved upgrading the command and control, radar, communications, electronic warfare and armament systems. Further improvements, such as modifying the vessel to accommodate the new Sikorsky CH-148 Cyclone helicopter and satellite links will be done separately from the main Frigate Equipment Life Extension (FELEX) program.

The FELEX program comprised upgrading the combat systems integration to CMS330. The SPS-49 2D long range air search radar was replaced by the Thales Nederland SMART-S Mk 2 E/F-band 3D surveillance radar, and the two STIR 1.8 fire control radars were replaced by a pair of Saab Ceros 200 re-control radars. A Telephonics IFF Mode 5/S interrogator was installed and the Elisra NS9003A-V2HC ESM system replaced the SLQ-501 CANEWS. An IBM multi-link (Link 11, Link 16 and Link 22 enabled) datalink processing system was installed along with two Raytheon Anschütz Pathfinder Mk II navigation radars. Furthermore, Rheinmetall's Multi-Ammunition Soft kill System (MASS), known as MASS DUERAS was introduced to replace the Plessey Shield decoy system. The existing 57 mm Mk 2 guns were upgraded to the Mk 3 standard and the Harpoon missiles were improved to Block II levels, the Phalanx was upgraded to Block 1B and the obsolete Sea Sparrow system was replaced by the Evolved Sea Sparrow Missile.

== Service ==
The frigate's keel was laid down on 19 March 1987 by Saint John Shipbuilding Ltd. at Saint John, New Brunswick. The first warship constructed in Canada since 1971, the vessel was launched on 30 April 1988. The ship was provisionally accepted by the Canadian Forces in June 1991. This was followed by a year of sea trials, which after a series of issues that arose during the trials led to modifications in later vessels of the design. The ship was commissioned into the Canadian Forces on 29 June 1992.

On 2 April 1994, Halifax sailed to relieve the destroyer Iroquois as Canada's contribution to the naval blockade of Yugoslavia in the Adriatic Sea. While in transit to Adriatic, one of the ship's diesel engines broke down and the frigate was forced to continue on gas turbines only. Halifax's tour ended when the ship returned to CFB Halifax on 9 September. In early 1995, the frigate sailed to Europe and made several port visits in connection with the 50th anniversary of the end of the Second World War in Europe. Halifax then took part in the NATO naval exercise "Linked Seas" off Portugal, returning to Halifax in June.

On 18 March 1996, Halifax departed for the Adriatic for a second tour with the embargo force, operating as flagship of the group for part of the ship's deployment. In 1998, the frigate took part in the NATO naval exercise "Strong Resolve" off Norway and assisted in the recovery operation following the crash of Swissair Flight 111. In 2000, Halifax deployed with NATO's STANAVFORLANT fleet between 26 July and 15 December.

Halifax departed Halifax on 15 August 2001 to join STANAVFORLANT. However, on 8 October 2001 the ship was diverted for combat operations in the Indian Ocean following the September 11 attacks on the United States. The frigate was the first Canadian ship on station and was deployed in the north Arabian Sea, integrated into the USS Carl Vinson carrier battle group. Halifax was replaced by sister ship Toronto in December. The ship returned to Halifax on 11 February 2002.

On 13 January 2010, as part of Operation Hestia, it was announced that Halifax would be deployed to the waters around Haiti to assist in relief efforts after the January 2010 earthquake, along with the destroyer Athabaskan. Specifically Halifax was to be deployed outside the area of Jacmel, which was slow to receive aid due to the fact the roads were cut off and the airport was too small to handle large aircraft. The frigate arrived off Jacmel on 18 January. Halifax provided air traffic control for Jacmel Airport on the ship. The ship departed Haiti's waters on 19 February. On 4 September 2010, Halifax was turned over to Irving Shipbuilding's Halifax Shipyard, to start an 18-month mid-life upgrading and modernization.

Halifax participated in the acceptance trials of the new CH-148 Cyclone helicopters acquired for the Royal Canadian Navy. In September 2015, Halifax, along with Athabaskan, were deployed for two large NATO training missions, "Joint Warrior" and "Trident Juncture". Halifax underwent a year-long refit at Halifax Shipyard beginning in 2016. The vessel returned to service on 27 September 2017. In October 2018, Halifax was among the Canadian ships sent to participate in the large NATO exercise Trident Juncture in the North Atlantic and Baltic Seas. On 26 October 2018, a minor fire began in the starboard gas turbine in the forward engine room of Halifax. The fire was extinguished quickly and the frigate continued on her deployment.

On 6 July 2019, Halifax sailed for the Mediterranean Sea to join Standing NATO Maritime Group 2 (SNMG2) as part of Operation Reassurance. Once the frigate joins SNMG2, Halifax will become flagship of the unit. However, within 24 hours of the frigate's departure, Halifax returned to port after an oil leak was discovered in one of the engine rooms. The vessel's departure for the Mediterranean was delayed. The oil leak was repaired and Halifax sailed for the Mediterranean, where the frigate spent six months. The vessel returned to Canada on 24 January 2020.

Halifax departed Canada on 1 January 2021 to join the Standing NATO Maritime Group 1 (SNMG1) for six months. Upon the vessel's arrival on 18 January in Lisbon, Portugal, command was transferred to Halifax as the flagship of the unit. Upon the ship's return to Canada on 19 July, the crew was ordered to isolate aboard the ship in Halifax, after a crew member tested positive for COVID-19. A second sailor tested positive for COVID-19 on 20 July, and later a third.

On 22 February 2022 the federal government announced that Halifax would depart again to accompany HMCS Montréal for Operation Reassurance to provide additional military support, regional security and humanitarian assistance to Central and Eastern Europe in the wake of Russian aggression in Ukraine. Halifax departed Canada on 19 March to join the Standing NATO Maritime Group 1 in the Baltic Sea. The two ships returned to Halifax in July.

In early 2024, Halifax was turned over to Irving Shipbuilding's Halifax Shipyard for an extensive refit, maintenance and repair period. The ship is expected to exit the graving dock in early 2027 and return to service in 2028.
