= Ali Nawaz Ghoto Halt railway station =

Railway station in Pakistan

Ali Nawaz Ghoto Halt Station علی نوازگھوٹو ہالٹ ریلوے اسٹیشن علي نواز گهوٽو هالٽ ريلوي اسٽيشن

General information
- Coordinates: 27.962728°N 69.263908°E
- Owner: Ministry of Railways
- Line: Jamrao–Pithoro Loop

Other information
- Station code: ANGH
Location
- Location within Sindh Location within Pakistan

Ali Nawaz Ghoto Halt railway station (Urdu: علی نوازگھوٹو ہالٹ ریلوے اسٹیشن, Sindhi: علي نواز گهوٽو هالٽ ريلوي اسٽيشن) is located in Pakistan.

== See also ==
- List of railway stations in Pakistan
- Pakistan Railways
