= Jacmel Airport =

Jacmel Airport Ayewopò Jakmèl
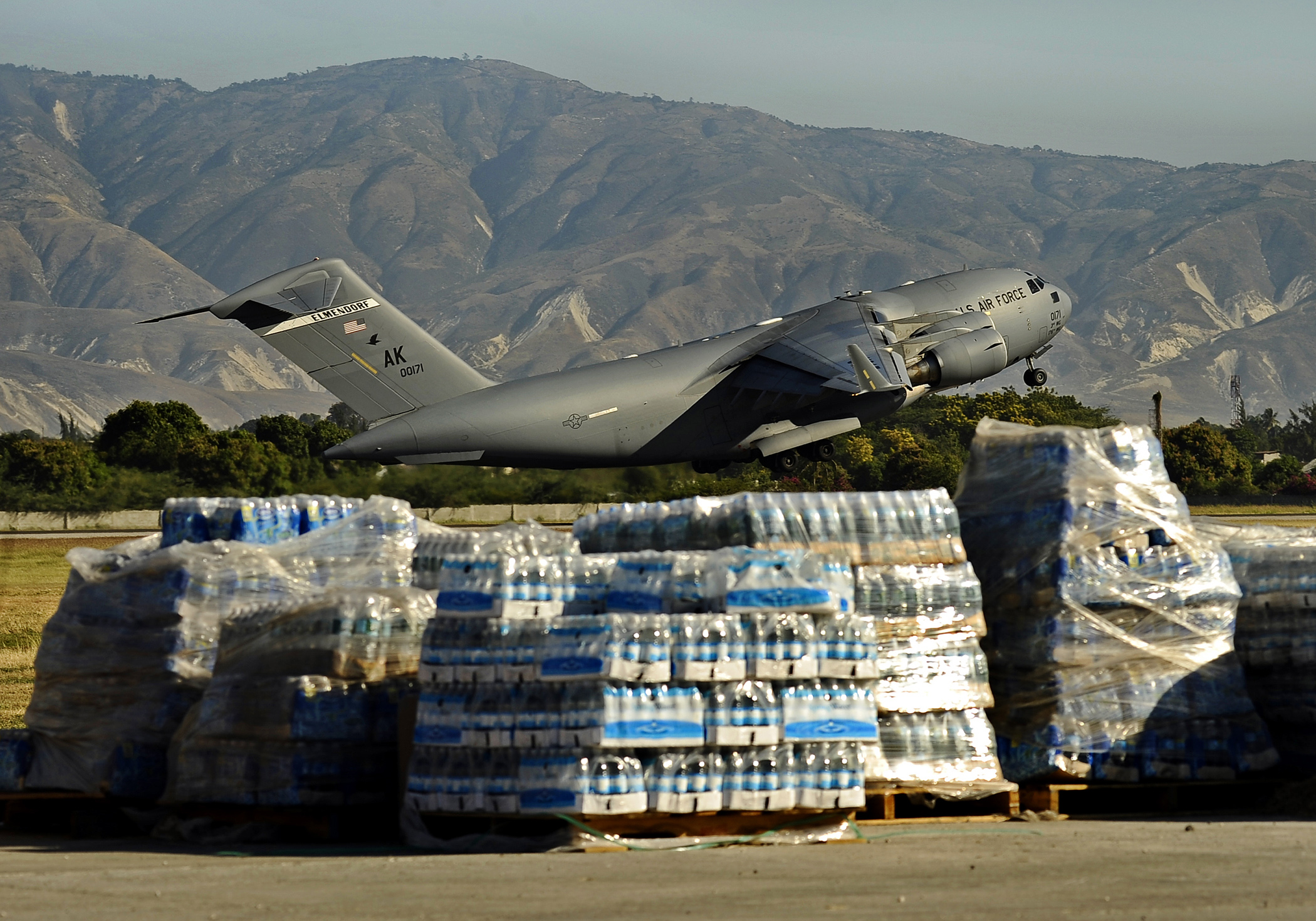
- IATA: JAK; ICAO: MTJA

Summary
- Airport type: Public
- Operator: Autorité Aéroportuaire Nationale
- Serves: Jacmel, Haiti
- Location: Jacmel, Haiti
- Elevation AMSL: 167 ft (51 m)
- Coordinates: 18°14′28″N 072°31′07″W
- Website: http://www.aan.gouv.ht/

Map
- Location in Haiti

Runways
Direction	Length		Surface
Direction	m	ft	Surface
01/19	1,006	3,301	Asphalt
- Sources: DAAFIF

Jacmel Airport (IATA: JAK, ICAO: MTJA) was the sixth busiest airport in Haiti by passenger volume before the 2010 Haitian earthquake, near the city of Jacmel, on Haiti's south coast. The airport's time zone is GMT –5, and is in World Area Code region #238 (by the U.S. Department of Transportation). This airport is normally served by scheduled and charter airlines operating in the capital Port-au-Prince, and was opened in 2006 for travel to and from the capital and other destinations across the country.

== History ==
Regular airline service started on 29 January 2005 with a flight from Tortug' Air.

Subsequent to the 7.0 magnitude 12 January 2010 earthquake, the airport was first used by Canadian Forces CH-146 Griffon helicopters on 14 January, to reconnoitre the area for relief efforts prior to the arrival of the main disaster assistance forces to be deployed at Jacmel. Trees at the edge of the approach to the runway meant that C-130 Hercules transports were only able to land at the facility with great difficulty. The first Canadian Forces CC-130 Hercules flight (CFC 3923) into Jacmel Airport landed on 18 January, and flights by Canadian Forces CC-130 Hercules cargo aircraft were commenced thereafter. Canadian airfield engineers studied whether improvements to the runway would permit the heavier CC-177 Globemaster to land at Jacmel Airport. Canadian soldiers first arrived at the airport aboard CC-130 flights on Tuesday, 19 January. The identification of Jacmel as a possible site for use and the decision to use the airport was made by Canadian Major-General Yvan Blondin.

8 Air Communications and Control Squadron installed runway lighting on 19 January, enabling aircraft to land at night, with radar control of the airspace provided by the nearby HMCS Halifax. Opening the Jacmel airfield 24 hours-a-day was intended to help relieve congestion at Toussaint Louverture International Airport in Port-au-Prince. An air traffic control facility was established at the airport, and as of 22 January the airport could accommodate a mix of 160 military and civilian fixed-wing and helicopter flights a day.

Some degradation of the runway was discovered on 29 January 2010, as a result of the heavy use of the airstrip. At the north end of the airstrip, the pavement had starting to pothole. At the same time, plans have been established by the US military to shift military flights from Toussaint Louverture International Airport in Port-au-Prince to Jacmel, to allow civilian flights into Toussaint Louverture. It was expected that around 100 flights per day would be shifted from Port-au-Prince to Jacmel. The Port-au-Prince airport resumed commercial flights, after repairs to the terminal structures, on 19 February.

After tree and terrain clearings to allow greater runway overshoot areas, Jacmel Airport started accepting heavy-lift C-17 Globemasters from 20 February to facilitate disaster recovery efforts. By March 2010, flights had tapered off at Jacmel to 20–40 flights daily from an average of 80 per day during the heat of the relief operations, and from an original two to four per week prior to the earthquake. Airport staff received training with the Canadian Forces to upgrade their skills in handling traffic.

In the wake of the Canadian Forces pullout, the airport could no longer process international flights, as no equipment remained to operate the control tower, nor heavy equipment to process the planes, or security to police supplies at the airport. As such, it has been handling only about a flight a day since the pullout, and has lost its certification for handling international flights.

The airport was temporarily placed under the control of the Canadian Forces in the aftermath of the Haiti earthquake. It was one of two operational airports near the epicentre of the earthquake, the other being Toussaint Louverture International Airport, which was placed under the temporary control of the United States Air Force by the Haitian government. In March 2010, the Canadian Forces returned control to Autorité Aéroportuaire Nationale.

== Facilities ==
The airport was originally built to accommodate smaller commercial flight services, but no large aircraft.

Prior to the January 2010 earthquake there was no air traffic control service at the airstrip, and its ramp area could only accommodate five aircraft at a time. The maximum weight an aircraft could have and use the facility was 100,000 lbs. The runway was unlit and the airstrip lacked an instrument landing system, radar and other radio navigation aids –used for landings in poor weather. As such, it could normally only support good weather (VFR) daylight operations.

The airport also hosted the local UN MINUSTAH base.

On September 9, 2010, a new terminal building was inaugurated by Public Works, Transport and Communications Minister, M. Jacques Gabriel, as well as by the General Manager of the Autorité Aéroportuaire Nationale, M. Lionel Isaac. The runway had been resurfaced as well (asphalt, 1000 meters).

== Airlines and destinations ==
After many months with no scheduled services at the airport, as of 15 April 2022, Sunrise Airways was offering flights between Jacmel and Port-au-Prince three times per week.

As of 2026, domestic flights are now resumed and the following airlines which operates scheduled services at the airport.

Airlines	Destinations
Sunrise Airways	Cap-Haïtien, Port-au-Prince

== Ground transportation ==
Most passengers arrive or depart from Jacmel by car via Route 208 located at the south end of the runway.

== See also ==
- Toussaint Louverture International Airport, the capital's airport, also involved with the 2010 Haiti earthquake relief
- Operation Hestia, the Canadian military relief effort for the January 2010 Haiti earthquake
