= New Life Children's Refuge case =

Alleged kidnapping during the 2010 Haiti earthquake

The New Life Children's Refuge case was an incident of alleged kidnapping and the ensuing legal cases which occurred in the aftermath of the January 12th 2010 Haiti earthquake. On January 29, 2010, a group of ten American Baptist missionaries from Idaho attempted to cross the Haiti-Dominican Republic border with 33 Haitian children. The group, known as the New Life Children's Refuge, did not have proper authorization for transporting the children and were arrested on kidnapping charges. The missionaries denied any wrongdoing and claimed that they were rescuing orphans and leading them to a Dominican hotel which was being transformed into an orphanage. Nine of the ten missionaries were later released but NLCR founder Laura Silsby remained incarcerated in Haiti. By the time she went to trial on May 13 the charges had been reduced to "arranging irregular travel" and the prosecution sought a 6-month prison term. On May 17, she was found guilty and sentenced to the time served in jail prior to the trial.

== New Life Children’s Refuge ==
The New Life Children's Refuge (NLCR) was founded in November 2009 by Laura Silsby and Charisa Coulter, who are both members of the Central Valley Baptist Church in Meridian, Idaho. The organization described itself as a "non‐profit Christian ministry dedicated to rescuing, loving and caring for orphaned, abandoned and impoverished Haitian and Dominican children, demonstrating God’s love and helping each child find healing, hope, joy and new life in Christ." The charity claimed to be in the process of acquiring land to build an orphanage as well as a church and school in Magante on the Northern coast of the Dominican Republic. NLCR further intended to provide adoption opportunities for American "loving Christian parents". On January 12, 2010, Haiti was struck by a major earthquake and NLCR quickly formed the "Haitian Orphan Rescue Mission", a group of ten people from the Central Valley Baptist Church and the East Side Baptist Church in Twin Falls, Idaho. Both churches are affiliated with the Southern Baptist Convention. The mission's plan was to go to Haiti and bring a hundred orphans to Cabarete, Dominican Republic, where NLCR had leased a hotel to serve as a temporary orphanage.

== Timeline of events ==
The ten missionaries, led by Silsby, flew to the Dominican Republic on January 22, chartered a bus, and arrived in Haiti on January 25. American journalist Anne-Christine d'Adesky states that she met Silsby the day before the missionaries' entry into Haiti. The NLCR's leader explained that she had a letter from Dominican officials authorizing the transfer of orphans to the hotel in Cabarete. D'Adesky warned Silsby that she also required proper paperwork from Haitian authorities. On January 26, the group gathered forty children and set off for the Dominican Republic. They were stopped by a policeman, who explained that their actions were illegal. Undeterred the group set out to collect orphans from the devastated town of Calebasse (or Callabas) and from the slum of Le Citron in Port-au-Prince. 33 children (20 from Calebasse and 13 from Le Citron) were put under the mission's care. On the night of January 29, the missionaries were arrested while trying to cross the Dominican border without proper authorization. They denied any wrongdoing and maintained that they were doing God's will by helping orphaned victims of the earthquake. The children were sent to the SOS Children's Village orphanage in Croix-des-Bouquets, a suburb of Port-au-Prince, and it became clear that most (if not all) of them were not orphans. NLCR missionaries maintained that they were told that the children were orphaned. In turn, people in Calebasse and SOS Children's Villages accused the missionaries of lying about their intentions. Although the children's relatives were told that they would be able to visit them and eventually take them back, the NLCR's mission statement clearly outlined plans for adoption.

On February 4, the ten Baptists were formally charged with criminal association and kidnapping for trying to smuggle 33 children out of Haiti. In an interview, the United States Ambassador to Haiti Kenneth Merten, stated that the U.S. justice system would not interfere and added "the Haitian justice system will do what it has to do." On February 5 former president of the United States Bill Clinton, who was appointed by the United Nations as relief coordinator for the earthquake, appealed for a swift end to the case to ease tensions between Haiti and the United States in the relief effort. On February 17, eight of the ten members of the NLCR team were released by Haitian judge Bernard Saint-Vil. They were immediately flown back to Miami on a US Air Force transport plane. Laura Silsby-Gayler and Charisa Coulter were held over for more questioning. On March 8 Coulter was also released, but Silsby remained incarcerated. The charges against Silsby were eventually reduced from conspiracy and child abduction to "arranging irregular travel". Her trial began on May 13, and prosecutors asked for a 6-month prison sentence, arguing that Silsby was fully aware that she did not have proper authorization to take the children out of the country. On May 17, she was found guilty and sentenced to the time served in jail prior to the trial.

== Laura Silsby - Gayler ==
Laura Silsby founded the New Life Children's Refuge and led the expedition in Haiti. Though she was freed after serving her sentence in Haiti, she also faced legal problems in Idaho. In early March 2010, her attorney in these cases filed a motion to withdraw as her counsel.

Silsby faced civil lawsuits for fraud, wrongful termination and unpaid wages mostly related to Personal Shopper, an Internet company that she founded in 1999 with James Hammons. Silsby and Hammons worked together at Hewlett-Packard. Silsby became part of MYSTATE USA an emergency notification company headed by Claudia Bitner in 2011. MYSTATE USA changed its name to Alertsense. Alertsense has since started another company called Konexus because of bad press when its software was involved in the 2018 Hawaii false missile alert. Silsby married and now goes by the name Laura Gayler or Laura Silsby Gayler.

== Jorge Puello ==
In the days following the group's initial arrest, Dominican Jorge Puello represented some of the detainees, falsely portraying himself as a lawyer. Caleb Stegall, an attorney representing Culberth, McMullin, and the Thompsons, stated, “My clients have never met Mr. Puello and know nothing about him.” Judge Saint-Vil said he had questioned Silsby about what connection she might have with Puello. Puello later acknowledged that he is under investigation for sex trafficking in El Salvador and wanted in the United States for smuggling people across the Canada–US border. Puello was incarcerated for short terms in both Canada and the US. He was arrested in the Dominican Republic on March 18, 2010. On August 18, 2010, the Dominican Supreme Court authorized Puello's extradition to the United States where he was sentenced to 37 months of prison in June 2011.

== See also ==
- L'Arche de Zoé
