= Asociación de Guías Scouts Dominicanas =

National Guiding organization of the Dominican Republic

- Association of Dominican Girl Guides
- Country: Dominican Republic
- Founded: 1961
- Membership: 588
- Affiliation: World Association of Girl Guides and Girl Scouts

The Asociación de Guías Scouts Dominicanas (AGSD; Dominican Girl Guide Association) is the national Guiding organization of the Dominican Republic. It serves 588 members (as of 2003). Founded in 1961, the girls-only organization became a full member of the World Association of Girl Guides and Girl Scouts in 1969. The Dominican Republic Girl scout uniforms are the same as the United States uniforms.

The Guide Motto is Siempre lista, Be prepared.

== See also ==
- Asociación de Scouts Dominicanos
