= Asociación de Scouts Dominicanos =

National Scouting organization of the Dominican Republic

- Membership: 1,278
- Affiliation: World Organization of the Scout Movement
- Website https://scouts.do

The Asociación de Scouts Dominicanos (Dominican Scout Association) is the national Scouting organization of the Dominican Republic. Scouting came to the Dominican Republic in 1914, and the Asociación de Scouts Dominicanos was founded in 1920 and became a member of the World Organization of the Scout Movement in 1930. It serves 1,278 Scouts of both sexes as of 2011.

Scouts are active in community service, tree planting, conservation and pollution control, and are becoming active in environmental awareness.

Many Scouts, Rovers and Scout Leaders attend annual training courses in fire control and lifesaving conducted by the Fire Department.

== Program and ideals ==
- Manada (Cubs)-ages 7 to 10
- Tropa (Scouts)-ages 11 to 15
- Caminantes (Explorers) -ages 15 to 18
- Clan (Rovers)-ages 18 to 21

The Scout Motto is Siempre listo, Always ready.

The highest rank was formerly the Scout Enriquillo, named for a Taíno cacique who rebelled against the Spaniards in the 16th century.

The membership badge of the Asociación de Scouts Dominicanos incorporates elements of the flag of the Dominican Republic.

=== Scout Oath ===
Yo prometo por mi honor y con la gracia de Dios, hacer cuanto de mí dependa para cumplir mis deberes para con Dios y la patria, ayudar al prójimo en todas circunstancias y cumplir fielmente la Ley Scout.

=== Scout Law ===
- El Scout cifra su honor en ser digno de confianza
- El Scout es leal para con su patria, padres, jefes y subordinados
- El Scout es util y ayuda a los demás sin pensar en recompensa
- El Scout es amigo de todos y hermano de todo Scout sin distincion de credo, raza, nacionalidad o clase social
- El Scout es cortés y caballeroso
- El Scout ve en la naturaleza la obra de Dios, protege a los animales y plantas
- El Scout sonríe y canta en sus dificultades
- El Scout es económico, trabajador y cuidadoso del bien ajeno
- El Scout es limpio y sano en pensamientos, palabras y acciones

== See also ==
- Asociación de Guías Scouts Dominicanas
