= Humanitarian response by national governments to the 2010 Haiti earthquake =

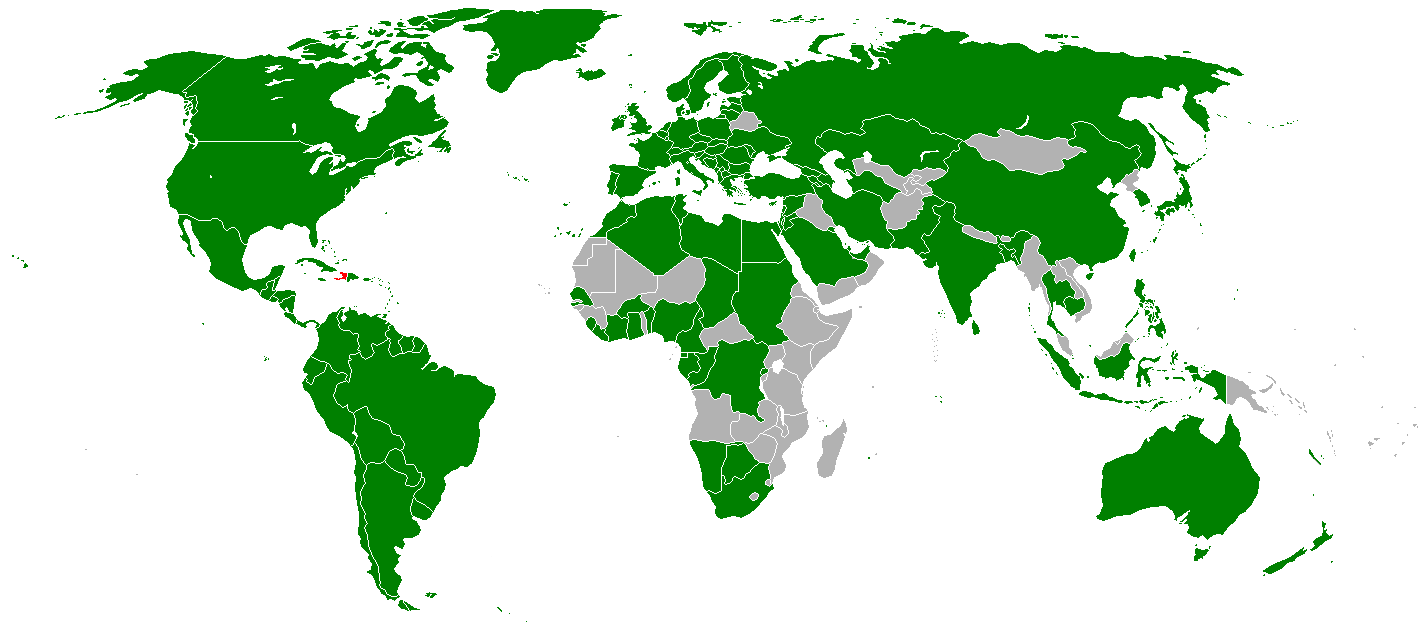
Helping Haiti by the whole countries financially.

The humanitarian response by national governments to the 2010 Haiti earthquake included numerous national governments from around the world pledging to send humanitarian aid to the Haitian people. The United Nations Office for the Coordination of Humanitarian Affairs (OCHA) and ReliefWeb are coordinating and tracking this aid.

More than six months later, after the earthquake, less than one-tenth of the money that was pledged by foreign governments to the United Nations special fund for the Haiti quake was actually received. As of 20 July 2010 of all the nations that had pledged money to this fund only 20 countries had actually sent any money: Australia, Brazil, Canada, China, Denmark, Estonia, Finland, France, Germany, Ireland, Italy, Netherlands, New Zealand, Norway, South Africa, Spain, Sweden, Switzerland, United Kingdom, and the United States. Others have sent supplies and/or personnel instead of money, and/or they pledged or sent money outside of the UN channels.

Initial pledges of assistance were tracked by the US Congressional Research Service. In 2015, the United Nations reported that US$13.34 billion had been earmarked for Haiti through 2020, though in the two years following the quake, less than half of that amount had been deployed.

== Americas ==
=== North America ===
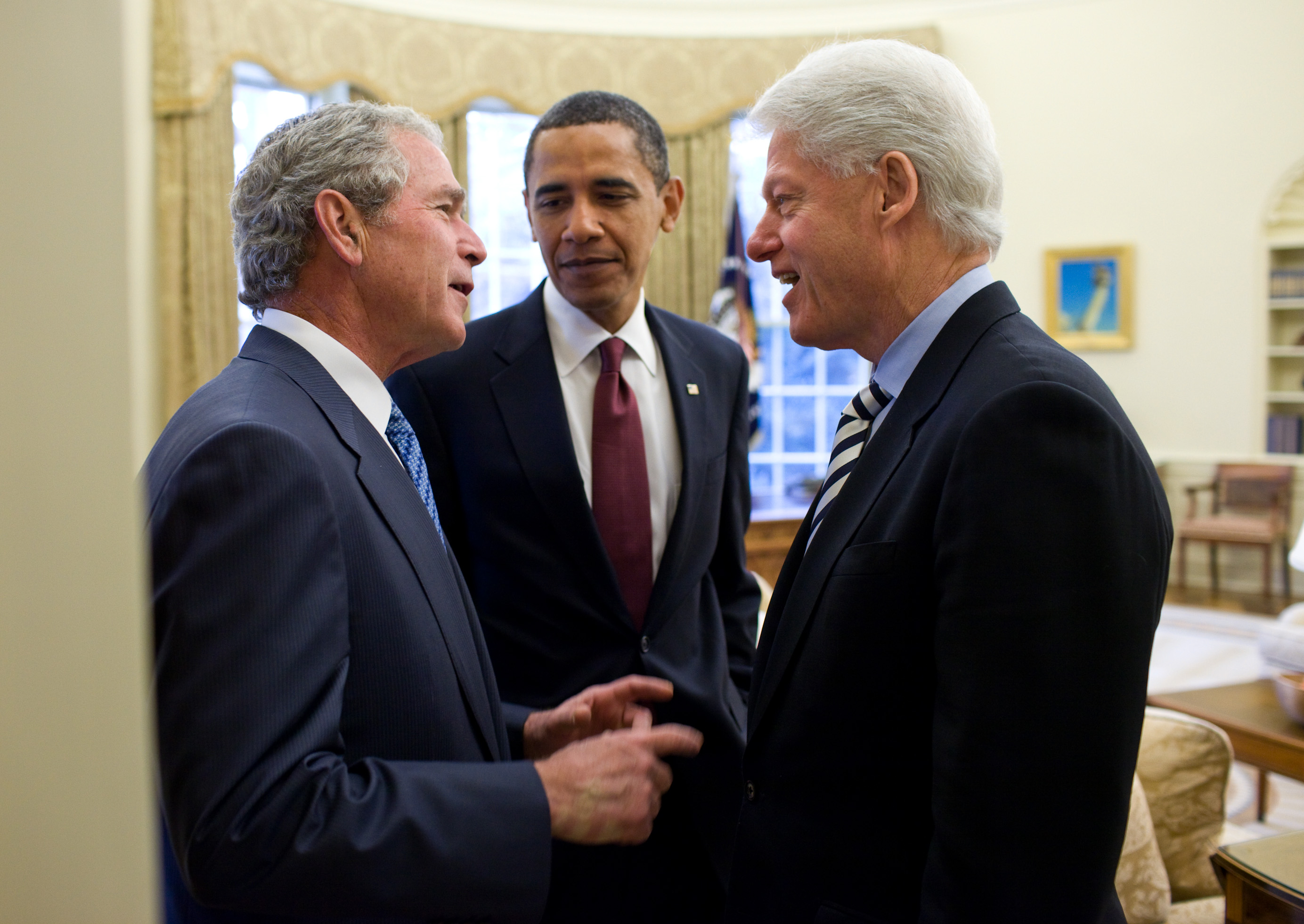
U.S. President Barack Obama (center) in the White House with two former presidents Bill Clinton (right) and George W. Bush (left) discussing the 2010 Haiti earthquake.

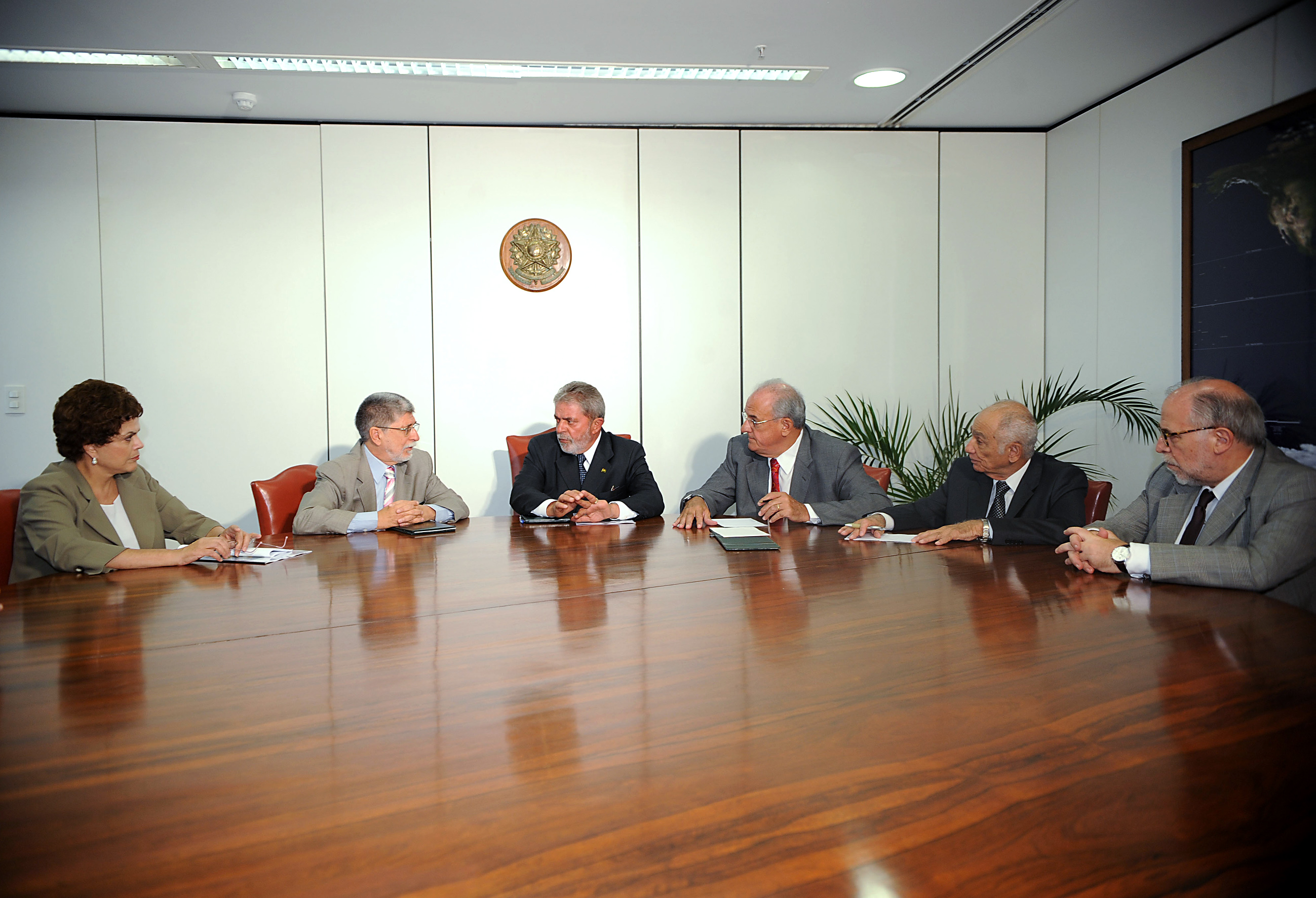
Brazilian President Luiz Inácio Lula da Silva and his Brazilian high-ranking officials convene an emergency meeting in Brasília, Brazil to discuss the 2010 Haiti earthquake.

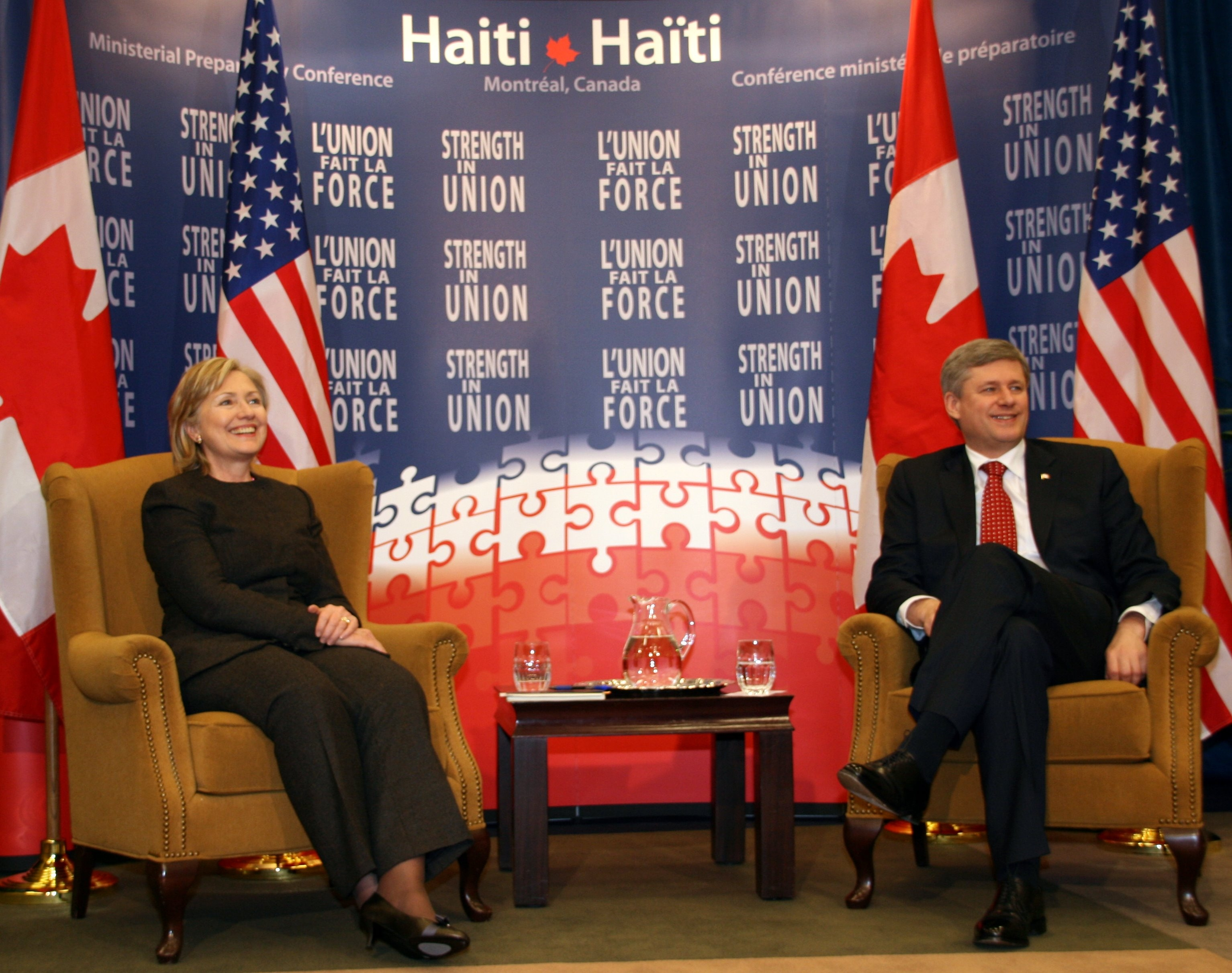
Canadian Prime Minister Stephen Harper (right) and U.S. Secretary of State Hillary Clinton (left) at the Haiti Ministerial Preparatory Conference addressing the humanitarian response to the 2010 Haiti earthquake relief efforts in Montreal, Canada.

Canada: Haitian-born Canadian Governor General Michaëlle Jean issued a statement, with parts in Haitian Creole, thanking the Cabinet for its swift action and the Canadian media for its coverage, as well as urging strength and courage to Haitians. Canadian Prime Minister Stephen Harper stated, "While officials are currently assessing the damage and the possibility of Canadians injured, Canada stands ready to provide any necessary assistance to the people of Haiti during this time of need." Prior to the disaster, Haiti was Canada's second largest aid recipient. The Minister of Foreign Affairs then announced that Canada, home of a large Haitian community, would be donating an additional Can$5 million dollars in emergency aid, as well as matching donations from Canadians to build an emergency fund up to Can$100 million to help humanitarian efforts in Haiti.

The Canadian government made Haitian immigrants in the family class a priority. On 19 January 2010, the Canadian government announced an additional Can$80 million for relief efforts in Haiti. This includes Can$60 million to the UN appeal, including Can$39 million to the World Food Programme for food security needs and Can$15 million to UNICEF; Can$11.5 million to six Canadian NGOs; Can$8.5 million to the Red Cross; and smaller amounts to other organizations including the International Organization for Migration, the World Health Organization, the Pan-American Health Organization, The United Nations Population Fund, and the United Nations Department for Safety and Security; for a total donation of up to Can$135 million including the original Can$5 million and the promise to match donations made by Canadians to charities providing Haiti relief up to Can$50 million.

Canadian Forces mounted Operation Hestia, led by Brigadier General Guy Laroche with a mandate to deliver a wide range of services in support of security and reconstruction Canada's Disaster Assistance Response Team (DART) was sent to Haiti, along with the frigate HMCS Halifax and the destroyer HMCS Athabaskan. CC-177 Globemaster and CC-130 Hercules III transports delivered personnel and equipment, including six G-Wagon armored cars and six CH-146 Griffon search and rescue helicopters. The CH-124 Sea King from Athabaskan also participated in the operation including search and rescue and evacuation.

Canadian Forces also deployed 1,200 troops from the 3^{e} Bataillon, Royal 22^{e} Régiment, including two rifle companies and one field engineer. A further 60 vehicles were deployed along with crews, bringing the total number of Canadian troops in Haiti to 2,000, including the 500 sailors aboard Athabaskan and Halifax. Canadian Forces collaborated directly with Canadian Medical Assistance Team in the operation of their field hospital in Léogâne. On 21 January 2010, Canadian Defence Minister Peter MacKay announced that 1 Field Hospital based in Petawawa, Ontario would be sent to Léogâne along with its medical staff of at least 100 personnel in the next couple of days.

Almost 2,000 persons were evacuated from Haiti to Canada on 20 flights. On 23 January 2010, Canadian Foreign Minister Lawrence Cannon announced that 17 Canadians had died, 1,939 Canadians had been located, and that 236 remained unaccounted for. Canadian Prime Minister Stephen Harper announced on Saturday that the government has removed the Can$50 million cap placed on the donation amount the government would match. Approximately Can$113 million has been donated by Canadians. An English language Canada for Haiti telethon raised Can$16 million and its Francophone counterpart generated Can$6.6 million. With the matching donation from the federal government, Canada's total aid contribution will be over Can$226 million. On 26 January 2010, the DART team established a new 5,000-liter drinking water system in Jacmel.

Mexico: After the 1985 Mexico City earthquake, the Ministry of Foreign Affairs will deploy a plan used to aid civilians during the natural disasters in Haiti. As an emergency response the government sent three Hercules C-130 military aircraft carrying over 20 tons in supplies, as well as satellite communication devices, water treatment plants, electricity generators, and over 160 specialists in search and rescue, health professionals, and engineers sent to set up communications in Haiti. One of these airplanes, with 60 federal policemen, had to temporarily abort its mission, due to lack of space at the airport. The water treatment plant had to be returned to Mexico, due to lack of ground transportation. The government also sent the Navy's amphibious lander ARM Papaloapan with several thousand tons of aid materials, and the hospital ship ARM Huasteco, as well as additional aircraft.

In the aftermath of the earthquake, the Mexican government granted humanitarian visas to the family members of Haitian-Mexicans. As of 27 April 2010, the number of Haitian citizens granted visas was 324, with 250 arriving on the Mexican naval ship ARM Usumacinta.

During a visit to the national Mexican Red Cross Collection Center, Mexican President Felipe Calderón announced that Mexico will make a special donation to Haiti with the amount of US$8 million, which will be channeled through the United Nations.

To help with Haiti's recovery, Mexico will give scholarships to 300 Haitian students to study at Mexican universities. These students will also each receive a US$625 monthly stipend while their studies continue. The first 103 students arrived in 2013, followed by 93 in 2014 and the rest arriving in 2015.

United States: U.S. President Barack Obama pledged an initial US$100 million in aid.

Obama said: "My thoughts and prayers go out to those who have been affected by this earthquake. We are closely monitoring the situation and we stand ready to assist the people of Haiti." The aid amount was later raised to US$379 million. The aid is distributed through the military and through the U.S. Agency for International Development The expected breakdown of aid was:

- 42% for direct disaster assistance
- 33% for U.S. military aid
- 9% for food
- 9% to transport the food
- 5% for paying Haitian survivors employed in recovery efforts
- less than 1% directly to the Haitian government
- about 0.5% to the Dominican Republic for dealing with Haitian refugees.

At the request of President Obama, two former Presidents Bill Clinton and George W. Bush have agreed to help, forming the Clinton Bush Haiti Fund, a charity organization to aid the victims of the Haiti earthquake.

Elements of the US Military were deployed to Haiti as part of Operation Unified Response. Over 16,000 United States military personnel were deployed to Haiti in support of the US response:

- The US Coast Guard cutters USCGC Forward and USCGC Mohawk, both arrived in Port-au-Prince on 13 January 2010. A Maritime Intelligence Support Team aboard Forward assessed damage to the port. The cutters were supported by the destroyer USS Higgins. Two US Air Force special operations MC-130H Combat Talon II aircraft also arrived with emergency supplies, medical units, and special operations teams. Other Coast Guard ships including USCGC Valiant and USCGC Tahoma were dispatched.
- As of 14 January 2010, the US Air Force Special Operations personnel were controlling operations at Toussaint L'Ouverture International Airport, after having cleared runways and setting up 24-hour air traffic control.
- On 15 January 2010, the aircraft carrier USS Carl Vinson arrived off Port-au-Prince to provide humanitarian aid, with its trained personnel, emergency supplies and 19 helicopters on deck.
- The U.S. Navy hospital ship USNS Comfort with 1,000 beds and 956 naval hospital staff was deployed to Haiti, as were the guided-missile frigate USS Underwood, and the guided missile cruiser USS Normandy.
- Approximately 2,000 US Marines of the 22nd Marine Expeditionary Unit from Camp Lejeune sailed on USS Bataan, USS Carter Hall, and USS Fort McHenry; and 3,000 United States Army soldiers of the 82nd Airborne Division from Fort Bragg were sent on 14 January 2010.
- Additional Marines from the 24th MEU on USS Nassau, USS Mesa Verde, and USS Ashland; which sailed from Naval Station Norfolk, were diverted from their scheduled deployment to the Middle East. This was the first use of the V-22 Osprey for a humanitarian mission.

Four injured personnel from the US embassy were evacuated to the naval base at Guantanamo Bay by US Coast Guard helicopters.

As of 29 January 2010, the US suspended medical evacuations of critically injured victims due to a dispute over who would pay for medical care.

According to Dr. Barth A. Green, co-founder of Project Medishare for Haiti, a nonprofit group affiliated with the University of Miami's Miller School of Medicine that had been evacuating about two dozen patients a day, this suspension could be catastrophic for the injured patients, adding "People are dying in Haiti because they can't get out." Medical evacuations were resumed on 1 February 2010.

=== Central America and the Caribbean ===
Antigua and Barbuda: The Antiguan government donated EC$100,000 (US$37,000) to relief efforts.

Bahamas: Bahamian Immigration Minister John Thompson suspended the repatriation of illegal Haitians residing in the country. With the prospect of a massive exodus of refugees fleeing from Haiti, government officials are sending tents, bedding, food and personnel to the island of Inagua, which is the closest Bahamian island to Haiti.

Barbados: The Government of Barbados established a mechanism to coordinate national relief efforts and identify military personnel to aid in the earthquake damaged areas.

Belize: The Government of Belize has offered aid to Haiti.

Costa Rica: On 13 January 2010, Costa Rican President Óscar Arias announced that Costa Rica would be sending as much help as possible when the United Nations had a list ready. Arias also said that it was time for the world to remember Haiti. On 15 January 2010, Costa Rica sent a team of 55 personnel trained in the search and rescue of victims under collapsed structures. Due to the heavy air traffic in the area and logistical limitations, the team composed of firefighters, doctors, police officers, and Red Cross paramedics had to first land in the Dominican Republic and later brought to Port-au-Prince by an American military airplane. They brought with them satellite communication devices and two uninterruptible power supply units provided by the Costa Rican Institute of Electricity which can create up to 24 satellite phone lines. The team also brought with it two detection dogs trained on search and rescue provided by the Costa Rican Emergency Commission.

Cuba: Thirty field hospitals were established within 48 hours. Cuba sent another 30 doctors to join 400 medical staff already in the country. The Cuban government opened its normally restricted airspace to US government medical evacuation flights, allowing faster evacuation of injured to medical facilities at Guantanamo Bay and Florida.

Dominica: The Government of Dominica announced a six-month grace period for Haitian nationals living illegally in Dominica, thus protecting them from arrest and deportation. Dominica pledged to send bottled water and dried goods to Haiti. A special account was set up at the National Bank of Dominica for corporate and private aid donations.

Dominican Republic: The Dominican Republic, which shares the island of Hispaniola with Haiti, was the first country to send aid to the devastated country. Dominican President Leonel Fernández rallied the international community to help its neighbour to overcome a "real tragedy." The Dominican Air Force is currently picking up survivors for aid and is transporting trained dogs to sniff for victims under rubble. The government has sent 15 mobile medical units along with 36 doctors including orthopedics, traumatologists, anesthesiologists, and surgeons. In addition, 39 trucks with canned food have been dispatched, along with 15 mobile kitchens and 110 cooks who can prepare 100,000 meals per day. The airport at El Higuero (8 km, 5 miles, north of Santo Domingo) is working as a hub to carry help local and international resources. According to sources, 19 private planes and 14 military helicopters are being used to carry help to Haiti. An air bridge is working between Port-au-Prince and Santiago de los Caballeros where people are being attended at the Hospital Metropolitano de Santiago (HOMS), a private hospital. Among others, Senator Kelly Bastien (president of the Senate of Haiti) is receiving medical assistance there. The hospital director stated that "our hospital intends to open a camp in Haiti in order to assist people in the field". The Dominican government and a large list of contributors from Banks and private companies donated the sum of RD$486 million (US$13.5 Million).

El Salvador: El Salvador for the time being will send a small contingent of eight firefighters, four Red Cross workers and a specially trained rescue dog. The Salvadoran government has also announced that they will be sending as much help as possible when the United Nations advise them on what is needed. On 15 January 2010, the government announced it would be sending a second fleet of 40 armed forces workers to help with the removal of rubble and to aid in the reconstruction of the earthquake-torn country. It was also announced that they would be sending 37 tonnes of goods to help those in need as well as two groups of lifeguards that would help to search for and rescue any missing people.

Grenada: The Government of Grenada donated US$100,000.

Guatemala: Guatemalan President Alvaro Colom dispatched a military plane with rescue workers to Haiti on 14 January 2010. Guatemala already had a staff and military personnel as part of MINUSTAH.

Honduras: Honduran government officials organized a mission of 15 firefighters, 15 rescue workers, and a team of medics that departed Tegucigalpa on 14 January 2010. In addition to the team of volunteers, a large shipment of food and cement were also sent.

Jamaica: Information Minister Daryl Vaz stated that 150 JDF personnel, armed with technical expertise in a variety of areas, would be participating in the search-and-rescue mission, the paramount exercise to be executed in the aftermath of the earthquake. Jamaican hospitals were placed on stand-by to admit Haitians in need of medical attention.

Nicaragua: Nicaragua sent 31 rescuers and military doctors of the Humanitarian Rescue Unit (URH) to Haiti on 14 January 2010, along with humanitarian aid. The URH mission included electricians who would participate in rebuilding the damaged electrical system in Port-au-Prince.

Panama: Panamanian Vice-President Juan Carlos Varela indicated that Panama is willing to help, and pledged that the Panamanian government would provide assistance to the United Nations Office for the Coordination of Humanitarian Affairs (OCHA) in matters of logistical coordination of cooperation. OCHA's Latin America regional offices are in Panama City. Panama will deploy search-and-rescue experts from the Civil Protection Office and firefighters from the Panama Fire Department, as well as equipment and food supplies.

Saint Kitts and Nevis: Kittitian Prime Minister Denzil Douglas established the Haiti Solidarity Fund at the St. Kitts-Nevis-Anguilla National Bank to enable corporate and individual financial donations towards the relief efforts.

Saint Lucia: The Government of Saint Lucia approved EC$500,000 (US$19,120) in aid. The island nation is ready to provide more relief support via a unified CARICOM effort.

Saint Vincent and the Grenadines: Vincentian Prime Minister Ralph Gonsalves has organized a relief effort to transport rice, flour and other emergency supplies to Haiti.

Trinidad and Tobago: Trinidad and Tobago has committed an immediate relief aid package of $6.3M (US$1M) to assist Haiti.

=== South America ===
Argentina: On 13 January 2010, Argentine President Cristina Fernández pledged the deployment of two Argentine Air Force C-130 Hercules aircraft carrying emergency aid. Argentina already had a 600-member force as part of the MINUSTAH peacekeeping operations including the Argentine Air Force Mobile Field Hospital treating nearly 1,000 people on the first night following the earthquake, one of the few medical facilities that remained functional. and two UH-1N military helicopters, part of UN flight, which carried a number of the more severely injured to the Dominican Republic for medical treatment.

A team of White Helmets (Cascos Blancos) arrived in Port-au-Prince on 16 January 2010. A team of 17 medics set up a new camp at Léogâne being the first to arrive to the scene four days after the earthquake. A third aircraft was dispatched on 24 January 2010. The airplane made a stop on Paraguay to pick up aid donated by that country.

Bolivia: The Government of Bolivia announced it would contribute food and blood donations to the relief efforts.

Brazil: Brazilian President Luiz Inácio Lula da Silva offered to send US$15 million in aid. On 21 January 2010, the Brazilian government announced that its humanitarian aid destined to support Haiti's stabilization and reconstruction process will reach R$375 million (approximately US$210.7 million), an amount which includes the previously promised $15 million. Also, 900 more troops will be immediately sent to Haiti in order to increase the strength of the 1,300 Brazilian servicemen currently supporting MINUSTAH.

Additionally, Brazil will deploy aid in the form of food and supplies. Two government ministries expect to send 600 tons of rice, beans, and powdered milk. Immediate aid will be dispatched in two aircraft carrying, in total, 28 tons of food (sugar, powdered milk, sardines and ham), bottled water, and other supplies. Four smaller aircraft will also be sent with relief workers, since a larger Boeing KC-137 of the Brazilian Air Force was unable to land on 13 January 2010. In addition, the Brazilian Navy will deploy a ship to Haiti with equipment capable of producing potable water. This is Brazil's largest foreign aid contribution in response to a natural disaster. The headquarters of the Brazilian-led MINUSTAH was destroyed in the quake. The Brazilian Army forces' building remains intact, however. The Brazilian army is currently doing its work on foot due to the amount of debris on roads. Brazil's servicemen are providing help in the search for survivors. The Brazilian Army is also sending 18 sniffer dogs to help with the body search. On 2 February 2010 the Brazilian Navy's landing ship Almirante Sabóia was sent to Haiti with 700 tons of cargo. The Brazilian Red Cross of the state of Ceara raised 160 tons worth of donations. The Brazilian Navy checked the possibility of sending a second ship to Haiti. The Brazilian air force has as of 9 February 2010 transported 708 tons of cargo to Haiti. A second Brazilian navy ship, the landing ship Garcia D'Avila was sent to Haiti with 900 tons of cargo.

Chile: Chilean President Michelle Bachelet sent Juan Gabriel Valdés, first chief of the UN mission in Haiti, as presidential delegate to coordinate the humanitarian aid sent by Chile, just 46 days before another earthquake. The Chilean presidential airplane was used to send the first aid to Haiti, arriving in the morning on 14 January 2010.

Colombia: On 14 January 2010, a C-130 aircraft departed for Haiti with three tonnes of rescue, medical and security supplies, a mobile military hospital, several medical and rescue teams plus search and rescue dogs. The National Defense Ministry and Colombian Air Force enabled several military bases and international airports as regional hubs for humanitarian logistics from other Haiti-supporting countries.

Ecuador: An Ecuadorian government delegation arrived in Port-au-Prince airport with five tons of food, including the urban search and rescue team, members of the Quito Fire Department. Red Cross, police, and military also arrived in Port-au-Prince airport on 13 January 2010.

Guyana: Guyanese President Bharrat Jagdeo announced US$1 million in financial assistance for Haiti.

Paraguay: Paraguay dispatched 12 humanitarian workers including doctors and surgeons and over 56,000 kilograms of food to Haiti on 14 January 2010. On 24 January 2010, more aid was sent aboard an Argentine Air Force C-130 Hercules,

Peru: Peru sent a total of aid 100 tons in food and medical aid, and 18 health professionals and two field hospitals suited for emergency surgical interventions. Peru's MINUSTAH contingent, consisting of 205 peacekeeping troops, will help in Haiti's reorganization. Peru also sent rescue teams with sniffer dogs.

Suriname: Suriname has dispatched military and police personnel to Haiti, as well as blankets and rice.

Uruguay: Uruguay has sent two water purifying plants donated by the national water management company, as well as a team of trained rescuers.

Venezuela: Foreign Minister Nicolás Maduro ordered 50 members of the "Army of Peace", the Brigade "Simón Bolívar" from his country to transport food and aid. The Foreign Ministry has also set up a collection center in Caracas so Venezuelans can donate food, water, clothes, and other goods. In total Venezuela provided 616 tonnes of emergency relief, establishment of shipping and air corridor, medical and SAR teams; 116 tons of special machinery for reconstruction; food (10,000 tonnes), non-food items (30,000 tents), medicines and 225,000 barrels of diesel fuel and gasoline and transported SAR teams on six flights (total 107.5 tons; 520 aid personnel) Two Venezuelan Navy ships are "loading the more than 1,200 tons of food such as pasta, sugar and milk, among others, and once we have filled those ships, undoubtedly will be shipped to Haiti" said Luis Díaz Curvelo, National Chief of Lifeguards. Venezuelan President Hugo Chávez promised to send as much gasoline as Haiti needs for electricity generation and transport. Venezuela also donated 225,000 barrels of diesel fuel and gasoline for hospitals and generators in Haiti.

== Europe ==
Albania: The Government of Albania pledged or donated €30,000 (US$40,800) to the International Committee of the Red Cross.

Andorra: The principality's government announced that it will allocate €57,500 to both the United Nations (€50,500) and the country's charitable NGO efforts in Haiti (€7,500). The €50,500 was not delivered to the UN fund for Haiti, at least as of six months later.

Austria: The Austrian government dispatched logistics experts to the country.

Belgium: On 13 January 2010, Belgium dispatched its B-Fast team of 58 people, including four sniffer dogs and a water purification facility. On 15 January 2010, Belgian Chief Coordinator Geert Gijs, upon learning that the UN security personnel would not remain overnight at their field hospital, decided to pack up his team's supplies and leave; Gijs said it was a "tough decision", but that he decided to evacuate after the Canadian medical team, also at the hospital, left the site with their security officers on Friday afternoon. The decision left Sanjay Gupta, a CNN correspondent, as the only doctor present overnight at the hospital; Gupta was limited in his ability to help the 25 patients left at the field hospital because the Belgian team had taken their supplies when they left. Belgian King Albert II sent condolences to the Haitian government, and the team returned the next morning.

Bosnia and Herzegovina: The chairman of the Council of Ministers of Bosnia and Herzegovina, Nikola Špirić, pledged a donation of 100,000 BAM (US$75,000) to the Red Cross. The Prime Minister of Republika Srpska, Milorad Dodik, pledged US$100,000 to Haiti.

Bulgaria: The Bulgarian Ministry of Defence contributed 1.5 tonnes of tents, blankets, and household linens to relief efforts. Later, the country sent medical supplies and a medical team to Haiti and started gathering a second team of volunteers. Also the Bulgarian Red Cross and UNICEF started gathering donations via SMS service and a bank account. At least €635,000 have been gathered to date. A number of benefit concerts have been organized in schools and clubs.

Croatia: The Government of Croatia approved one million HRK (about US$200,000) to be sent to relief efforts.

Cyprus: Cypriot President Dimitris Christofias said that Cyprus has contributed €100,000.

Czech Republic: The Czech Republic sent Kč5 million in emergency relief to Haiti and then pledged to send Kč20 million (US$1,110,000) more, and will channel it through humanitarian organizations operating in Haiti; roughly another Kč15 million was raised by Czech NGO's. A contingent of Czech humanitarian workers will depart to Haiti (via the Dominican Republic) in the upcoming weeks to assist in reconstruction.

Denmark: The Ministry for Development Cooperation has pledged to donate around US$2M (kr10 million) to the UN's mission in Haiti. This pledge was increased by another US$8M (kr40 million). The Danish people donated kr65,000,000. In total, Denmark donated kr115,000,000.

Estonia: Estonia initially announced readiness to aid Haiti with €63,600. After a few days, the Ministry of Foreign Affairs announced that Estonia will increase this to €2,500,000 via the Red Cross; they will also send three member logistics crew. This amount of aid, once delivered, and would make Estonia the fourth largest donor as a percentage of gross domestic product in the European Union (EU).

Finland: The Finnish government pledged €1.25 million in aid.

France: French Foreign Minister Bernard Kouchner said France will dispatch aid to the country. Haiti is a member of La Francophonie (Association of French-speaking nations), but officially bilingual. The aid provided by France according to the French Government consists of:

- A detachment of 67 military from the military civil security (FORMISC) Brignoles and Crisis Support Unit of five persons including two communication specialists
- A 70-strong detachment tasked with deploying an advanced medical post and 10 mobile medical teams. This detachment also includes 24 Sécurité civile personnel tasked with supplying water for up to 20,000 people a day, 11 gendarmes to ensure the security of the detachments on the ground, and 11 gendarmes to ensure the security of the detachments on the ground and five German staff of the THW.
- A fourth 70-strong detachment of the Sécurité civile rapid medical response unit to provide logistical support and medical care.

In total nearly 300 Sécurité civile personnel will eventually be in Haiti with several dozen tonnes of equipment. Two ships, the Siroco and the BATRAL Francis Garnier, were dispatched as part of Opération Séisme Haiti 2010. The Siroco, which was off the Senegalese coast was ordered to head for Haiti. She is equipped with medical facilities (two operating theatres and 50 in-patient beds) and can carry 2,000 tonnes of cargo and 2,000 passengers, as well as four helicopters. A French Air Force Airbus A340 was dispatched to Fort-de-France carrying medical personnel to staff the Siroco and members of the gendarmerie. A team of six people, including a TDF (state radio and television company) engineer, was dispatched with the communications hardware required to reestablish the UN radio transmissions of Haiti Minustah FM, and also to repair the large transmitters located on the heights of the city. Radio France also lent assistance to several private radio stations. The BATRAL Francis Garnier, a light transport and supply ship, left Fort-de-France (Martinique) with 100 tons of freight and 60 soldiers. The ship carried six trucks, an ambulance, 4x4 vehicles, three mechanical shovels, food, bottled water, machines of building site, tents, humanitarian material and food. The ship does not require a dock to unload. Two C-130 Hercules belonging to the 2/61 Transport Squadron ('Franche-Comté'), were dispatched to Martinique. The first C-130 from France arrived with reinforcements, medical equipment and communications equipment. The second airplane arrived 17 January 2010. Together with three CASA CN-235 planes, an Airbus A310 (from the Esterel Squadron), an Aérospatiale Puma Helicopter and a Bombardier Dash 8 from the civil security they allow up to eight flights daily from the French Antilles to Haiti. The French government will contribute €10 million (US$14.4 million) for relief and rescue work, French Foreign Minister Bernard Kouchner announced on 18 January 2010. The contribution was a response to the appeal for emergency funding launched by the United Nations on 23 January 2010.

Germany: The German government has released an initial amount of €7.5 million (US$10.78 m) in aid. German Foreign Minister Guido Westerwelle said that his country had pledged aid to Haiti and called together a crisis management team to deal with the disaster. Two special THW teams, one trained to rescue survivors from the rubble, and the other equipped to provide them with safe drinking water, were sent to Port-au-Prince. Germany offered to send troops to Haiti.

Greece: Greek Prime Minister George Papandreou reminded the public that Haiti had been the first country, in 1822, to acknowledge the Greek War of Independence. The Greek Ministry of Foreign Affairs stated they will be helping international organizations coordinate humanitarian relief efforts. The government announced a donation of €200,000, and that the Foreign Ministry would send a team of 25 healthcare professionals, nurses, rescuers as well as Hellenic Aid officials and rescue workers, along with pharmaceutical supplies. Meanwhile, a bank account was created so that Greek citizens could contribute to relief efforts. The Greek Orthodox Church announced their humanitarian organization "Alilegii" is ready to coordinate charities all over Greece to send aid to Haiti.

Hungary: Hungarian government spokesman Domokos Szollár announced on 16 January 2010 that the Hungarian government had donated €100,000 for Haiti. This is in addition to cash and in kind aid already provided by Hungarian NGOs. The Hungarian government also sent a medical team.

Iceland: The Icelandic foreign ministry sent a search and rescue team, specialized in searching for survivors in collapsed buildings. The team consists of 37 people. The team brought 13 tonnes of rescue equipment. The team was among the first to arrived in the disaster zone on 13 January 2010.

Ireland: The Irish government had already put €20 million into the UN's Emergency Fund beforehand, and has rapid rescue teams on standby if requested. Irish Foreign Minister Micheál Martin has pledged additional money will be given to Haiti in the future. Taoiseach Brian Cowen offered his condolences to the Haitian people, and Irish President Mary McAleese sent her personal message of condolences to Haitian President Rene Preval, confirming that Ireland was praying for the victims of Haiti earthquake that Ireland would assist with money and she said, "The loss of so many lives and the widespread destruction caused by the earthquake has deeply grieved me".

Italy: Italy sent a military transport plane which will be used to carry in a field hospital and emergency medical team. Italy sent the aircraft carrier Cavour with 920 military personnel aboard to Haiti to assist in rescue and reconstruction work, as part of Operazione White Crane. The Cavour sailed from Italy on 19 January 2010, with a stop planned in Brazil to pick up Brazilian military medical staff. It will transport Italian Navy helicopters, tracked and wheeled army vehicles, and hospital facilities with two operating theaters. A company of army engineers is included in the contingent, as well as the Cavour crew members and medical staff, and force protection personnel from the navy, army, and air force. Italian Carabinieri military police will also be on board. Italy will also send a further contingent of 200 members of its military Carabinieri police corps to Haiti to help ensure security for the distribution of aid. The Carabinieri would be part of an EU police force to restore order and end looting on the island.

Italian regional administrations also contributed:

- Lazio: Rome Mayor Gianni Alemanno announced that the city has organized the departure of a first shipment of humanitarian aid to Haiti. This first tranche of aid, consisting of medicine and first aid valued at more than €600,000.
- Lombardy: The region has allocated €200,000 as emergency aid to Haiti. The announcement was made by President of the Lombardy Region, Roberto Formigoni. The €100,000 funding will be allocated to the purchase of essential supplies and the restoration of damaged facilities by Fondazione Francesca Rava, sending doctors and engineers and purchasing medical supplies and pharmaceuticals.
- Piedmont: The Solidarity Committee of the regional council has earmarked a budget of €250,000.
- Trentino-Alto Adige/Südtirol: The autonomous region has pledged €100,000 in emergency help. It will be distributed through Austrian and Italian Caritas organisations.

Latvia: The Latvian government has pledged €15,000, which will be channeled through the United Nations Central Emergency Response Fund.

Liechtenstein: The Government of Liechtenstein announced that it would allocate CHF200,000.

Lithuania: Lithuania's Ministry of Foreign Affairs allocated Lt50,000 (€14,500) in aid through its Development Cooperation and Democracy Promotion program.

Luxembourg: Rescue teams from Luxembourg accompanied a Belgian contingent of rescue workers that arrived in Haiti shortly after the earthquake.

Macedonia: On 21 January 2010, the Macedonian government announced that it will donate US$100,000 in financial assistance.

Malta: The Civil Protection Department collected blankets, canned food and drinking water for the victims.

Moldova: The Moldovan government provided US$100,000 to Haiti.

Monaco: Prince Albert II authorized €150,000 in emergency funds to be released to Haiti via the United Nations and the Red Cross.

Montenegro: The Government of Montenegro announced that it had allocated €50,000.

Netherlands: The Netherlands has pledged €3 million (US$4.3 million) in aid. On 14 January 2010, the Dutch urban search and rescue (USAR) team (72 persons, eight dogs) was dispatched to Haiti to aid in searching for survivors. The Royal Dutch Navy ship HNLMS Pelikaan sailed from Curaçao carrying 80 troops, several transport vehicles, small boats, and relief supplies. On 21 January 2010, Dutch radio and TV stations joined together for a day of fundraising and raised €83.4 million (US$117.87 million), half of which has been donated by the Dutch government.

Norway: The Norwegian government will be sending delegations from the Norwegian Red Cross, including a field hospital and the charitable organization Norwegian Church Aid. Norwegian Prime Minister Jens Stoltenberg said the country was initially pledging 40 million NOK (US$7M) to the immediate relief work, but soon raised it to 100 million NOK (US$17.5M), then some days later again, to a total of 200 million NOK (US$25M), and the money is provided through the various UN agencies and the voluntary organizations.

Poland: Fifty four rescue workers (Ciężka Grupa Poszukiwawczo Ratownicza – USAR Poland) flew out on 15 January 2010 equipped with four tonnes of specialized equipment. Ten search and rescue dogs were also on board, says the Ministry of Interior. The time delay of sending the team has been strongly criticized in the Polish media. The Polish government announced it will send US$150,000 in aid to the Red Cross. The Polish Medical Mission will also send a group of doctors and a field hospital. Sixty-three firemen from Poland have taken 12 dogs and four tonnes of equipment with them.

Portugal: The Portuguese government announced it will send a C-130 with 32 members of the Portuguese search and rescue team "Protecção Civil" (Civil Protection), supplies like tents, medical equipment and a complete hospital ward and immediate cash relief of €500,000. The team and supplies have been sent as of 15 January 2010. After many delays, due to both a technical failure and an overcrowded airport, the C-130 of the Portuguese Air Force arrived in Port-au-Prince on 17 January 2010. The plane brought over 10 tonnes of equipment to help as well as a team of members of the "Protecção Civil", firefighters, and medics from "Assistência Médica Internacional" (International Medical Help) and "Instituto Nacional de Emergência Médica" (National Institute of Medical Emergency).

On 18 January 2010, a TAP Portugal plane loaded with 3.5 tonnes of additional equipment departed from Lisbon en route to Caracas, Venezuela. From there, a C-130 of the Portuguese Air Force already in Haiti would deliver the supplies from Venezuela to Port-au-Prince. Supplies in this second shipment included tents, bathrooms, blankets, water purifiers, medicine, and food products. On 30 January 2010, the team left Port-au-Prince for Portugal, ending their mission. The seven elements of AMI remained on the ground providing medical assistance. Six hundred Haitians are living in the Campo Azul da União Portugal Haiti (Blue Camp of the Portugal Haiti Union). The government of the Azores donated €100,000.

Romania: On 14 January 2010, the Romanian government announced that it would send an unspecified amount of material aid to Haiti.

On 22 January 2010, the Romanian government announced that it would send €50,000 from its Assistance for Development budget of the Ministry of Foreign Affairs in 2010, through the World Food Programme. Romania also participated through the European Union contribution, and it is part of the UN mission restoring order in the country.

Russia: The Ministry of Emergency Situations of Russia has sent four Ilyushin Il-76 cargo planes containing rescue workers, supplies, heavy equipment, a mobile hospital including doctors and medical staff, with a capacity of 50 patients, and psychologists to assist families. Some of the Russian search and rescue workers were equipped with sniffer dogs to locate trapped survivors. The first two planes from Moscow, Russia contained doctors from the Ministry for Emergencies and the All-Russian Medical Disasters Centre and rescuers, including specialists with sniffer dogs and psychologists, as well as necessary equipment to conduct rescue operations and cross-country vehicles.

The fourth plane included the 15 Russian search and rescuers on board. The aircraft also delivered special hardware for search work, which made it possible to move heavy beams and make passages on the ground floors of destroyed buildings. It also had a light helicopter BK-117 on board, which made possible air reconnaissance and airlifts gravely wounded people from hard-of-access areas.

The total cost of the Russian operations stands at US$5 million as of 20 January 2010. On 1 April 2010, Russia's envoy to the UN, Vitaly Churkin, said Russia will donate US$8 million to help rebuild Haiti, bringing the total sum of the Russian aid to US$13 million. Russia delivered a total of 30 tonnes of humanitarian aid to Haiti.

Serbia: The Government of Serbia donated US$100,000. It was also announced that Serbia plans to send a few dozen members of the Gendarmery in the Italian contingent of peacekeepers in Haiti.

Slovakia: The Slovakia allocated €50,000 in aid to Haiti. Slovak paramedics were sent to Haiti.

Slovenia: The Slovenia allocated €50,000 in aid to Haiti.

Spain: The Government of Spain initially pledged €3 million in immediate emergency aid. The Spanish national and regional governments as well as semi-public medical and SAR agencies have contributed the following to the humanitarian effort:

- A SAR Team together with a team of EDAN (Damage Assessment and Needs Analysis) totaling 39 people and 15 dogs.
- A humanitarian charter from the Spanish Logistics Center in Panama. This shipment consists of 24 tonnes of humanitarian supplies from the Spanish Aid organization, the Spanish humanitarian organizations and the World Food Programme United Nations in America. It includes 1000 tarpaulins, 675 family cleaning kits, 4,200 20-litre water bladders, 450 blankets, 1,500 units of body bags and 55 family tents, a disaster kit and other MSF Spain hygiene and WFP food rations. The Logistics Center in Panama is tasked with ensuring humanitarian the air transport in response to the disaster. Shipping is funded by the Office of Humanitarian Action AECID costing over €100,000. Another similar cargo will be shipped from the Logistics Center.
- A C-130 Hercules with medical supplies for emergency care (11 tonnes) and 3.5 tonnes of drugs supplied by Farma Mundi. The five planes sent will also be used for evacuation of foreign nationals.

The Spanish Navy has dispatched the Castilla, a Galicia class landing platform dock vessel. The vessel is crewed by a complement of 423, and is fully equipped to function as a hospital, with two operating theaters, a laboratory, intensive care unit and X-ray facilities. It carries four helicopters. It is to arrive at Petit-Goâve in February 2010.

Sweden: The Swedish International Development Cooperation Agency (SIDA) donated US$900,000 in emergency aid. In addition, Sweden sent a two-person delegation, with 60 more to come.

Switzerland: A Swiss Air-Ambulance CL604 Challenger jet left Zürich on with a quick-response team from the Swiss Humanitarian Aid Unit in order to identify local needs and prepare in case of further deployment. The plane landed on 16 January with aid such as first aid kits, medical material and medicines, shelters and generators. A total of 41 Swiss experts are also on the ground in the region. Of these 25 were already in Port-au-Prince on Saturday, and another 14 were on their way there. According to the Swiss officials, a second plane will leave Switzerland with more aid on Monday, 18 January 2010.

Turkey: Turkey dispatched a mobile hospital, two check-up devices, a 20-person relief team, and 10 tonnes of medicine and medical equipment. The Turkish government donated US$1 million for Haiti. In kind – Field Hospital, 2 Healthcare Survey Unit, Medical Unit consists of 17 Personnel/paramedics and 10 tonnes of medical/first aid items, 20 tonnes of relief material consisting of 200 tents, 2000 blankets, 145 set of kitchen materials, 1000 plastic bags for corpses and three relief personnel, 1.5 tonnes of equipment including food and clothing, fully equipped 10 SAR Personnel of AKUT Association.

The Turkish rescue workers assistance to Haiti was noted on 18 January 2010 article on Turkish help in a joint rescue at a grocery store in Haiti, "A Creole-speaking man and woman were rescued late Sunday night by a team from Miami, Florida, and a Turkish team."

Ukraine: On 14 January 2010, Ukrainian President Viktor Yushchenko signed a decree which says that "With the goal of helping to tackle the consequences of the devastating earthquake in Haiti, the Cabinet of Ministers of Ukraine should immediately ensure that humanitarian aid is provided to the country".

United Kingdom: The UK sent US$10 million and pledged another US$22 million in aid. A team of 71 British urban search and rescue personnel and two search dogs left from the United Kingdom to fly to Haiti in an effort to rescue survivors. The team are equipped with specialized heavy rescue equipment. The BBC reported that a British Airways Boeing 747, crewed by volunteers from the airline, carried emergency supplies to Haiti, while another aircraft carried medical and rescue teams. A Royal Navy support ship is also to deploy to Haiti loaded with aid. Largs Bay sailed for Haiti on 3 February 2010.

== Africa ==
Algeria: Algeria allocated US$1 million in aid.

Benin: Beninese President Yayi Boni announced that his government will be organizing aid.

Botswana: The Government of Botswana pledged B$1M (US$149,000) to support relief efforts.

Burkina Faso: Burkina Faso pledged €152,000 to relief efforts.

Cameroon: The Government of Cameroon announced that they would provide an undisclosed amount in financial aid to Haiti on 22 January 2010.

Chad: The Government of Chad pledged US$500,000.

Democratic Republic of the Congo: The Government of the Democratic Republic of the Congo pledged US$2,500,000 in aid.

Republic of the Congo: The Republic of the Congo donated US$1,000,000.

Egypt: Egyptian President Hosni Mubarak directed the allocation of medical supplies and personnel to Haiti.

Equatorial Guinea: Equatorial Guinean President Teodoro Obiang Nguema Mbasogo pledged US$2M of relief aid to Haiti on 16 January 2010.

Gabon: The Government of Gabon pledged US$1M in aid.

Gambia: The Gambian President Yahya Jammeh has pledged US$1M in humanitarian aid.

Ghana: The Government of Ghana donated US$3M.

Ivory Coast: The Ivorian Government pledged US$1M to Haiti.

Liberia: Liberian President Ellen Johnson Sirleaf pledged an initial US$50,000 in aid to Haiti.

Libya: A cargo plane of humanitarian aid that included medicine and equipment departed Mitiga International Airport on 19 January 2010. The shipment was accompanied by Libyan rescue and medical teams that will provide rescue and medical assistance.

Mali: The Malian government donated CFA100M (US$213,000).

Mauritius: The Mauritian government contributed US$500,000.

Morocco: On 14 January 2010, Moroccan King Mohammed VI approved the release of US$1M in emergency humanitarian aid for Haiti.

Namibia: The Namibian government pledged N$7.4 million (US$1M).

Nigeria: Minister of Foreign Affairs Alhaji Jibril Maigari announced that the Nigerian government would provide an unspecified amount of financial aid towards the Haiti earthquake relief efforts. On 20 January 2010, the Nigerian House of Representatives passed a resolution to contribute NGN7.2 million to support relief efforts.

Rwanda: The Government of Rwanda committed RF56M (US$100,000).

Senegal: In addition to US$1m in aid, Senegalese President Abdoulaye Wade issued a promise of free land and "repatriation" for Haitian refugees. Abdoulaye Wade explained to Euronews: "Take case of Liberia, the Afro-Americans were transplanted there. Today, those people are successfully integrated with the other African peoples, because they’re of African origin anyway, and they had originally been sent to the America's against their will. So, it's not really so extraordinary to transplant those, who want to find a piece of land somewhere in Africa, and with the help of the international community, to create a city, and perhaps a whole country." The offer of repatriation was later modified as a resolution on creating a separate, independent state on the continent for repatriated Haitian refugees, the details of which were published by Le Soleil on 16 January 2010 and slated for submission to the African Union at a later date.

Seychelles: The Government of Seychelles offered aid to Haiti.

Sierra Leone: The Sierra Leonean government has pledged or provided US$300,000 to the United Nations' Haiti Disaster Relief Fund. Sierra Leonean President Ernest Bai Koroma sends condolences to Haitian President Rene Preval, and the country has also pledged to send police, soldiers and medical teams to the Caribbean nations.

South Africa: The Government of South Africa pledged R1M (US$135,000) for the relief efforts on 14 January 2010.

Sudan: Abdel-Baki Al-Gailani, state minister for humanitarian affairs, was named to head a national mobilization campaign that collected and sent humanitarian aid to Haiti; Sudan's aid input consisted of the combined contributions of the government, non-governmental organizations, private individuals and the Sudanese Red Crescent.

Tunisia: Tunisian President Zine el Abidine Ben Ali allocated US$1,000,000 to the UN Emergency Fund.

== Middle East ==
Armenia: After the 1988 Spitak earthquake in Armenia, the country kept an earthquake response force to deal with similar emergencies. Fifty-two of these rapid response workers, trained in earthquake response, were deployed to Haiti on 13 January 2010. The Armenian government said they would provide US$100,000 for reconstruction projects.

Azerbaijan: The Government of Azerbaijan announced that it will allocate US$500,000 to the United States' Haiti relief efforts.

Bahrain: Bahraini Prime Minister Prince Khalifa bin Salman Al Khalifa announced the donation of US$1M in aid. The Government of Bahrain sent a disaster relief team to assist with relief operations.

Georgia: On 13 January 2010, the Cabinet of Georgia announced that it would send humanitarian aid to Haiti. The Georgian government coordinated a special flight to carry 40 tons of humanitarian supplies and 405,000 GEL in financial aid. Apart from this, a group of 20 rescue personnel was assembled to fly to Haiti.

Iran: A cargo plane of consumables and goods such as tents, washing powder, sugar, canned food and kitchen utensils departed Tehran on 16 January 2010 for Haiti. The Islamic Republic of Iran also dispatched a medical team to Haiti, that was sent via Venezuela. Iran's Red Crescent Society said that Iranian medical team consisted of five doctors, three nurses, six relief workers will arrives in Port-au-Prince, Haiti, via Venezuela. Iranian medical team are going to establish a mobile clinic and distribute medicine. The team will stay in Haiti for one month and a second Iranian medical team will depart to the country next week. In the meantime, Iran has dispatched 30 tons of humanitarian aid including food, tents and medicine.

Israel: The Foreign Affairs Ministry dispatched a rescue team to Haiti consisting of 40 doctors, 20 nurses, and rescue workers, two rescue planes loaded with equipment, and a field hospital. A Magen David Adom delegation arrived in Haiti on 17 January 2010 to establish field clinics in cooperation with local rescue groups and as part of a larger American Red Cross mission. The Israeli search and rescue team remained in Haiti until 28 January 2010. The Israel Defense Forces (IDF) set up a satellite communications room with phone and wireless internet access, and video conference systems so surgeons working in the field hospital could contact medical experts back in Israel. Following a request from the United States and the United Nations, the Israeli Police sent 100 officers to join peacekeeping forces in Haiti. Shortly after the earthquake, Israel also sent a group of Israeli Police forensics investigators to assist in the identification of casualties. Israel also sent 220 personnel of the Home Front Command's search and rescue teams and the Israeli Medical Corps.

Jordan: King Abdullah II sent a two humanitarian aid aircraft then carrying relief items and a military field hospital to Haiti. The main Jordanian News Agency, Petra, reported on 15 January 2010: "A second military airplane left to Haiti on Friday to help victims of the earthquake that hit the island on Tuesday. The plane, dispatched upon directives of His Majesty King Abdullah II, is carrying Jordanian medics and medical equipment used during the disaster event times." Jordan established a 12-bed military hospital in Port-au-Prince, and are also feeding children who enter; dispatched two planes carrying a mobile field hospital, rescue team, doctors and six tons of aid supplies that includes food, medicine, and clothing.

Kuwait: The Kuwaiti government made a US$1M donation to the Kuwait Red Crescent Society for distribution to the Haiti relief effort. The Kuwaiti government also donated 100 tonnes of humanitarian aid in the form of food, medical supplies, tents and blankets.

Lebanon:: A contingent of Lebanese aid workers will head to Haiti shortly with medical supplies and tents. Lebanon also airlifted 25 tons of tents, 3 tons of medicine, vaccines and other supplies; along with sending aid workers to help in relief effort.

Oman: Donations from individuals were collected in the nation of Oman. These donations from Oman are noted by the UN OCHA and ReliefWeb groups.

Qatar: Qatar sent a 26 members of search and rescue team and C-17 Globemaster III strategic transport aircraft loaded with 50 tons of relief materials. The Qatari rescue team, headed by Captain Mubarak Sherida Al Kaabi, established a field hospital to receive the urgent cases and help picking up bodies and reach those trapped under the rubble. Captain Al Kaabi said the team has saved a woman found alive and has given her full healthcare. So far, the number of cases have been treated by the team since its arrival reached more than 250 cases suffering from neglected trauma and fractures in addition to some minor surgeries as well as other conditions, Al Kaabi noted. A pictures of a members of the Qatari urban search and rescue team praying at the Toussaint Louverture International Airport in Port-au-Prince, Haiti was taken on 20 January 2010.

Saudi Arabia: The Saudi Arabian Foreign Ministry announced that the kingdom will donate US$50M in humanitarian aid. This money is confirmed to have been delivered by the United Nations. From the United Nations Office for the Coordination of Humanitarian Affairs (OCHA); "The Kingdom of Saudi Arabia has contributed US$50 million to support the United Nations humanitarian response to the earthquake in Haiti. This makes the Kingdom of Saudi Arabia one of the main contributors to the Haiti Flash Appeal, which was launched on 15 January." The Jeddah, Saudi Arabia–based Islamic Development Bank (IDB) also pledged $5 million to Haiti. Dr. Ahmad Mohammed Ali, President of the Jeddah-based Islamic Development Bank (IDB), has announced the Bank's approval to extend $5 million in aid for the reconstruction of Haitian educational facilities.

Syria: Deputy Foreign Minister Fayssal Mikdad at the meeting on 19 January 2010 with Honorary Consulate of Haiti in Syria, stated that the Syrian government will work with national and international humanitarian organizations as part of the relief effort. A Syrian plane with 30 tons of humanitarian aid was sent to Haiti on orders from the President of Syria.

United Arab Emirates: The United Arab Emirates announced it would set up a relief air bridge to take humanitarian supplies to Haiti. The nation's charitable organizations—including the Khalifa Charity Foundation, Zayed Foundation for Humanitarian and Charitable Works, Mohammed bin Rashid Al Maktoum Charity and Humanitarian Foundation—announced the coordination of additional humanitarian relief efforts. The United Arab Emirates either pledged or gave over US$2.6 million; along with three UAE charities donating more than 200 tons of medical equipment, tents and blankets, food and drinking water.

== Asia ==
=== Central Asia ===
Kazakhstan: Kazakh President Nursultan Nazarbaev sent condolences to Haitian President Rene Preval, and said that Kazakhstan would send aid.

Turkmenistan: Turkmen President Gurbanguly Berdimuhamedow announced that Turkmenistan would send US$500,000 to the United Nations special fund for Haiti. The money was not delivered to the UN fund for Haiti, at least not as of six months after the pledge.

=== South Asia ===
Afghanistan: Afghanistan pledged or gave US$200,000 in aid to Haiti. "Even countries with their own troubles rushed to Haiti's aid: Afghanistan provided $200,000."

Bangladesh: Bangladeshi Prime Minister Sheikh Hasina ordered the health ministry to send a medical team to Haiti. The 30 member medical team of 20 doctors and 10 health technicians left for Haiti on 18 January 2010.

India: India initially donated US$5M to Haiti. A 140-member Indian UN peacekeeping paramilitary contingent was already helping with stabilization duties and is now assisting rescue work.

Pakistan: After the 2005 Kashmir earthquake in South Asia, several Pakistani rescuers and troops are stationed (as part of the UN force) in affected areas by MINUSTAH as Pakistan is largest contributor to the UN peacekeeper forces while Pakistani Prime Minister Yousaf Raza Gilani on Monday directed the Cabinet Division to immediately provide relief assistance in the form of 3,000 tents/blankets and eight tons medicines to help for Haitian people affected by the earthquake.

Sri Lanka: Sri Lanka had 950 soldiers in Haiti assisting in peacekeeping efforts at the time of the Haiti quake.

=== East Asia ===
China: The People's Republic of China sent a 60-member rescue team (National Earthquake Disaster Emergency Rescue Team), and Chinese Red Cross Society pledged US$1M. The Chinese government itself announced it plans to deliver an additional US$4.41 million in humanitarian aid. A medical assistance station has been set up by the Chinese rescue team in Port-au-Prince. On 21 January 2010, China donated an additional US$2.6 million and sent a 40-member medical care and epidemic prevention team.

Japan: After the 1995 Great Hanshin earthquake, the Japanese government plans to offer up to US$5M in grant aid, which will be exercised through international organizations including UNICEF and the World Food Programme (WFP). It will also donate emergency relief materials for as much as ¥30 million (US$330,000). The Japanese Ministry of Defence deployed a disaster relief team (JDRT). The Japanese government sent a C-130 Hercules from Arizona with a 26 member-JDRT team and emergency relief goods stocked in Florida to Haiti. The medical team arrived at Léogâne, 30 km west of Port-au-Prince, and started its operation on 18 January 2010. The International Disaster Relief Medical Support Unit relieved JDRT of their activities in Léogâne.

South Korea: South Korean National Emergency Management Agency immediately dispatched team of 35 rescue workers. They set up a clinic in Port-au-Prince. In January 2010, an additional 10-member team was sent to review the area and determine on-site needs. In March 2010, South Korea sent in a further 250 member force to Haiti for a United Nations (UN)-led peacekeeping mission to help rebuild.

South Korea has provided a total of over US$13 million in aid, which is by far the largest aid package from East Asia, making it one of the main contributors of humanitarian aid to Haiti. The large-scale relief effort is seen to reflect the South Korea's determination to actively join the international efforts. South Korean President Lee Myung-bak hinted that additional assistance was on its way in a telephone conversation with UN Secretary-General Ban Ki-moon on 16 January 2010, and it sent an immediate US$1 million aid package as the first batch, and provided over US$10 million worth of aid on the second batch. About the two-thirds came directly from the South Korean government in the form of short and long-term aid, while the rest was the result of collective efforts from the private sector. Private organizations raised another US$2 million for Haiti.

=== Southeast Asia ===
Brunei: The Government of Brunei has pledged or gave US$50,000 in aid to Haiti.

Cambodia: The Royal Cambodian government contributed US$50,000.

Indonesia: Indonesian President Susilo Bambang Yudhoyono said Indonesia would send aid workers to help Haiti earthquake victims. Help from the government will consist of a team of 30 medical personnel including surgeons, a 10-member urban search and rescue (USAR) team, and 10 electrical experts. The remaining 25 are experts in construction and telecommunications. The Indonesian government will also send five tonnes of medical supplies, five tonnes of food, and five tonnes of special equipment and tools. The aid was airlifted by a Lion Air 747-400 jumbo jet. The aircraft was diverted to Santo Domingo in the Dominican Republic due to heavy air traffic in Haiti.

Malaysia: The Malaysian Ministry of Foreign Affairs has created the "Tabung Bencana Kementerian Luar Negeri" Fund to assist Haiti in collecting funds for relief efforts.

Philippines: The Philippines deployed a medical team. The Philippine Government has also donated US$50,000.

Singapore: The Singaporean government donated US$50,000 to the UN Office for the Coordination of Humanitarian Affairs.

Thailand: After the 2004 Indian Ocean tsunami, the Thai Government had initially decided to donate US$20,000 for humanitarian assistance in Haiti. Such amount of money gained heavy criticism that it was too little, while Deputy Prime Minister Suthep Thaugsuban remarked, "That was the first amount of money we could give, but more will come. We may send our military army engineers to join the world, following assessment of the situations. The problem is that Haiti is too far from us, unlike the cases having occurred in our neighbours such as Indonesia or the Philippines. What we could do for Haiti is only donation of money or personnel."

Thai King Bhumibol Adulyadej and Thai Queen Sirikit also sent a missive of condolences to Haitian President Rene Preval. Following that, the Council of Ministers resolved to send another US$100,000, which was later extended to US$382,000, and 20,000 tonnes of rice. Deputy Education Minister Chaiwuti Bannawat said in a cabinet meeting that medical teams from many educational institutes under his ministry were ready to go to Haiti, but needed funding from the government. While Thai Foreign Minister Kasit Piromya proposed to have his ministry co-ordinate the relief effort, but also the Natural Resources and Environment Minister Suwit Khunkitti offered to personally take the aid to the affected country. However, all was turned down by Thai Prime Minister Abhisit Vejjajiva, citing that money and rice was enough for the moment.

Vietnam: Vietnam donated US$130,000 to support relief efforts.

== Oceania ==
Australia: The Australian government pledged $10 million in immediate aid funding. Australian Government increased aid with additional $5 million to meet urgent and emergency humanitarian needs such as food, water and sanitation, shelter and medical assistance. The additional assistance in this immediate response phase includes: $3 million to the World Food Programme, $1 million to Australian Non-Governmental Organizations and $1 million to the Office for the Coordination of Humanitarian Affairs. Australian Prime Minister Kevin Rudd said the team of specialist Royal Australian Air Force (RAAF) air traffic controllers will be sent to Toussaint Louverture International Airport in Port-au-Prince to assist Haiti after the request from the U.S. government.

New Zealand: The New Zealand government pledged $1 million in aid, while New Zealand Agency for International Development (NZAID) agencies are on standby to assist Haiti. New Zealand Foreign Minister Murray McCully said the aid contribution would be distributed via international relief agencies, such as the International Red Cross and Red Crescent Movement and the UN agencies, in Haiti.

Papua New Guinea: The Government of Papua New Guinea has offered the humanitarian aid to Haiti.

== Other entities ==
Kosovo: The Government of Kosovo, which is not universally recognized by foreign governments, donated €50,000.

Palestinian territories: Humanitarian efforts in the Gaza Strip resulted in money, food and clothes collected and donated to the local Red Cross for relief efforts.

Taiwan: A team of 23 rescue workers and two specially trained dogs were sent. The Taiwanese government also promised US$5M and 200 metric tons of rice for relief efforts. A second team of rescuers departed on 16 January 2010, and carried with them more than 3,000 kg of equipment and supplies. Taiwanese President Ma Ying-jeou is due to be in Latin America to attend the inauguration of Honduran president-elect Porfirio Lobo Sosa, and is planning a brief stopover in Haiti to express his concern and convey the sympathy of Taiwanese people, as well as deliver more aid and provide long-term support for humanitarian reason.

== See also ==
=== 2010 Haiti earthquake ===
- 2010 Haitian cholera outbreak
- Casualties of the 2010 Haiti earthquake
- Damage to infrastructure in the 2010 Haiti earthquake
- List of earthquakes in Haiti
- List of populated places affected by the 2010 Haiti earthquake
- Timeline of relief efforts after the 2010 Haiti earthquake

=== Humanitarian response ===
- Humanitarian response to the 2010 Haiti earthquake
- Humanitarian response by non-governmental organizations to the 2010 Haiti earthquake
- Humanitarian response by for-profit organizations to the 2010 Haiti earthquake

=== Benefits and fundraising ===
- Canadians for Haiti
- Clinton Bush Haiti Fund
- Digicel Haiti Earthquake Relief Fund
- Ensemble pour Haïti
- Hope for Haiti Now
- Hit for Haiti
- Somos El Mundo 25 Por Haiti
- We Are the World 25 for Haiti
- Young Artists for Haiti
