= Lodgement (disambiguation) =

Lodgement is a military term meaning an enclave taken by and defended by force.

Lodgement may also refer to:

- Lodgement (finance), a banking or tax term in some countries
- Lodgement, a type of glacial till
