= Foreign aid to Haiti =

Overview of aid

Haiti—an island country 600 mi (970 km) off the coast of the U.S. state of Florida—shares the Caribbean island of Hispaniola with the Dominican Republic. Haiti has received billions in foreign assistance, yet persists as one of the poorest countries and has the lowest human development index in the Americas. There have been more than 15 natural disasters since 2001 including tropical storms, flooding, earthquakes and hurricanes. The international donor community classifies Haiti as a fragile state. Haiti is also considered a post-conflict state—one emerging from a recent coup d'état and civil war.

== United States aid to Haiti ==
Haiti's economic and social underdevelopment has been attributed to political instability and insufficient investment by the Haitian government towards natural and human resources. Between the fiscal years of 1995 and 1999, the U.S. contributed approximately US$884 million in financial assistance to Haiti. Haiti received US$13 billion in foreign aid from the international community from 2011 to 2021. Despite this, living conditions remain poor. According to page 35 of the Greening Aid book there are key questions that arise on where the money flows and why.

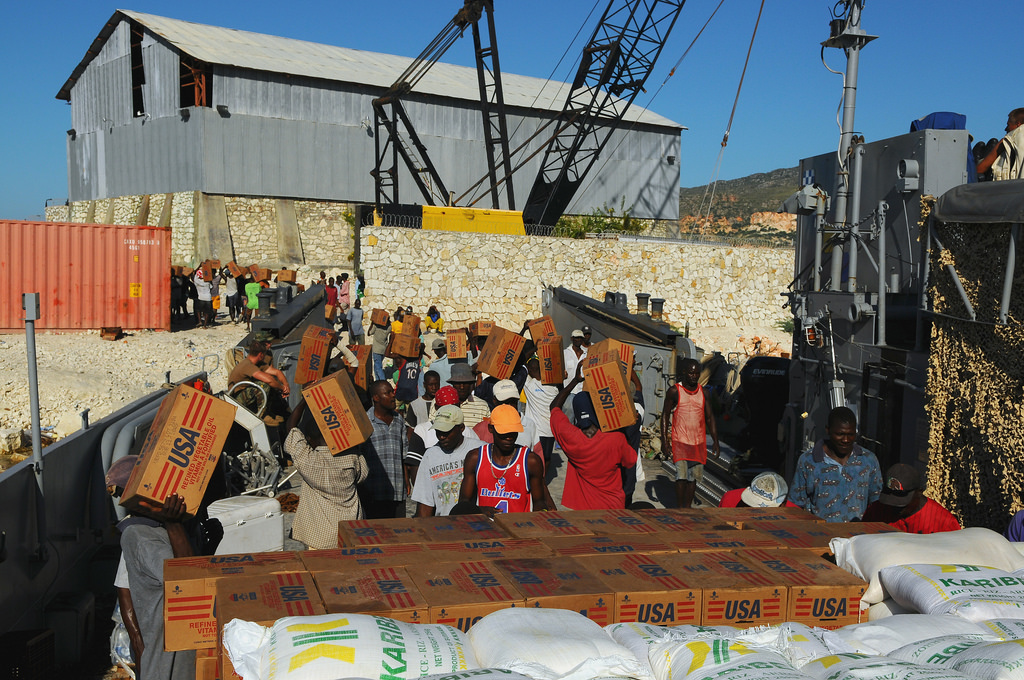
GONAIVES, Haiti (Sept. 26, 2008). Haitian civilians unload relief supplies from a landing craft utility assigned to Assault Craft Unit (ACU) 2 embarked aboard the amphibious assault ship USS Kearsarge (LHD 3). Kearsarge completed her humanitarian assistance and disaster relief mission in Haiti Sept. 26, delivering more than 3.3 million pounds of food, water and other supplies. U.S. Navy photo by Mass Communication Specialist Seaman Apprentice Joshua Adam Nuzzo.

Among the initiatives United States funds have supported are:

- Food assistance programs that include a school lunch program that feeds around 500,000 children daily
- Agricultural development programs that have endeavored to revitalize Haiti's coffee sector and to help thousands of Haitian farmers adopt sustainable agricultural practices and protect the environment
- Teacher training programs that have included 6,000 educators at the primary and secondary level
- Population programs that have expanded modern family planning practices in many rural areas
- Health care programs that have supported child immunization and have helped provide primary care to nearly half of the Haitian population
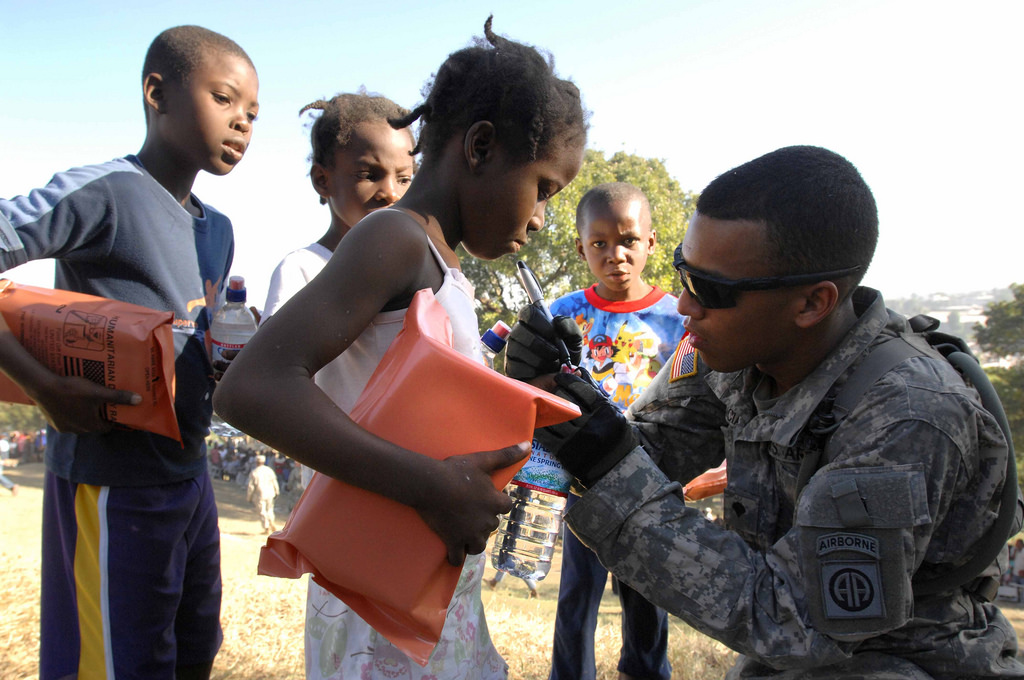
  Soldiers distribute aid in Haiti: Member of 82nd Airborne Division's 1st Squadron, 73rd Cavalry Regiment marks the fingernail of a small girl to indicate she has gone through the distribution line in Port-au-Prince, Jan. 18, 2010.

In 2021, the U.S. Government Accountability Office (GAO) reported on USAID funding for reconstruction and development activities since the 2010 earthquake.

=== Human resources ===
The U.S. provides human resources to Haiti. This includes tourism and humanitarian assistance. There is currently no Peace Corps program in Haiti. Peace Corps volunteers living in the neighboring Dominican Republic are prohibited from crossing the border.

=== Economic development ===
Haiti has experienced decades of extremely high unemployment and underemployment. The decline in urban assembly sector jobs, from a peak of 80,000 in 1986 to fewer than 17,000 in 1994, contributed to increased unemployment. To revitalize the economy, U.S. assistance has attempted to create opportunities for stable, sustainable employment for the growing population, particularly those who compose the country's vast informal economy. A post-intervention transitional program of short-term job creation, principally in small towns and rural areas, provided employment to as many as 50,000 workers per day throughout the country. More recently, programs that help to increase commercial bank lending to small- and medium-scale entrepreneurs, especially in the agricultural sector, have helped to create jobs and foster economic growth.

Additional U.S. efforts in economic revitalization include the establishment of the U.S.-Haiti Business Development Council, an Overseas Private Investment Corporation commercial loan program, and inclusion of Haiti within the Caribbean Basin Initiative. These efforts provide greater market opportunities for American and Haitian businesses. Current congressional prohibitions on providing assistance to or through the Haitian government has accelerated the move to private voluntary agencies as contractors to oversee the use of U.S. aid funds.

Throughout the 2001–2004 time period the United States Chamber of Commerce backed a government aid embargo upon Haiti's elected Aristide government. This led to economic decline. Haiti's government budget was approximately 30-40 percent dependent on the cut-off aid.

=== Obama-era to Trump-era transition on Haiti ===
During Barack Obama's eight-year presidential service, his administration pledged United States' assistance in Haitian foreign relief programs assisting global health, economic security, and food-related aid. Some of the goals of the U.S. Global Health Initiatives (GHI) include: HIV/AIDS prevention of 12 million individuals, reduction of Malaria for 225 million, and reduced mortality rates of 35% across all assisted nations. President Obama pledged $3.5 billion in a global hunger and food security investment from 2010 to 2012. The implementation of GHI and the Global Food Security Initiative (Feed the Future) contributed to an increase in total aid provided during the period of 2012 to 2015. The early years resulted in an increase and over usage of appropriated funding. Due to budgetary pressures, an overall lack of congressional support and interest, plus Haiti's own technical, environmental and economic reasons, many foreign aid programs have been cancelled and shelved, such as construction of a new port in northern Haiti, construction of the Caracol Industrial Park and expand port in nearby Cap-Haïtien. Although the assistance in Haitian foreign aid failed, it successfully revealed the importance of food security and agricultural development in Haiti.

A few days after President Trump's inauguration in January 2017, the State Department conducted a formal review of the United States' economic support fund. The review was specifically centered around the Obama administration's flurry of foreign aid contributions and initiatives made during the final two months of his term. In his first State of the Union address, President Trump iterated a theme of "America First", proclaiming his dislike of programs like democracy promotion and generic humanitarian aid aimed largely at countries in Latin America. President Trump insists that Congress pass laws to ensure that "American foreign-assistance dollars always serve American interests, and only go to "America's friends". However, only about one percent of the United States federal budget goes to foreign aid — 40% considered security assistance, rather than economic or humanitarian aid.

=== Biden era ===
The Biden-Harris Administration announced $75.5 million in bilateral development and health assistance in January 2021, covering democratic governance, health, education, agricultural development, and pre-election activities. This aid aims to support Haiti's safety, security, and development, marking a continued partnership between the two nations. The U.S. has also focused on delivering COVID-19 vaccines to Haiti, with plans to share more doses beyond the first 500,000 doses of Moderna vaccines provided.

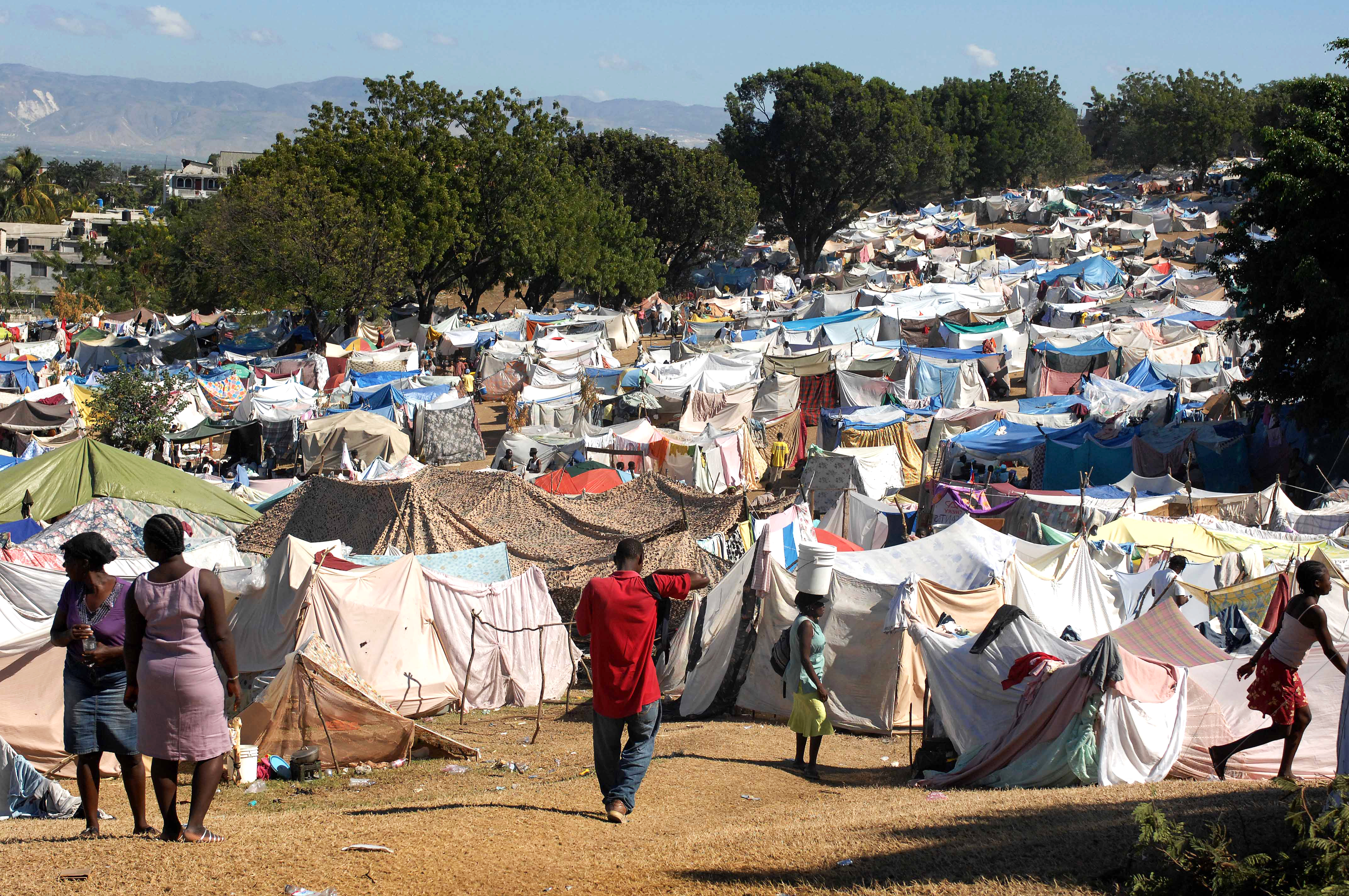
After the earthquake in 2010, about 1,000 people were living in tents on the outskirts of Port-au-Prince. Five years later, tens of thousands of people in Port-au-Prince still live in tents and other temporary housing. 2010-01-21

The Haiti Resilience and Agriculture Sector Advancement (HRASA) project, launched by USAID in 2021, aims to benefit more than 25,000 rural Haitian farmers, including women and youth. This project focuses on promoting private investment in the agriculture sector, expanding livelihood opportunities, and strengthening community institutions for better resource management.

== Canadian aid to Haiti ==
Canada is Haiti's second largest donor after the United States. During the unsettled period from 1957 to 1990, Canada received many Haitian refugees, who now form a significant minority in Quebec. Canada participated in various international interventions in Haiti between 1994 and 2004, and continues to provide substantial aid to Haiti.

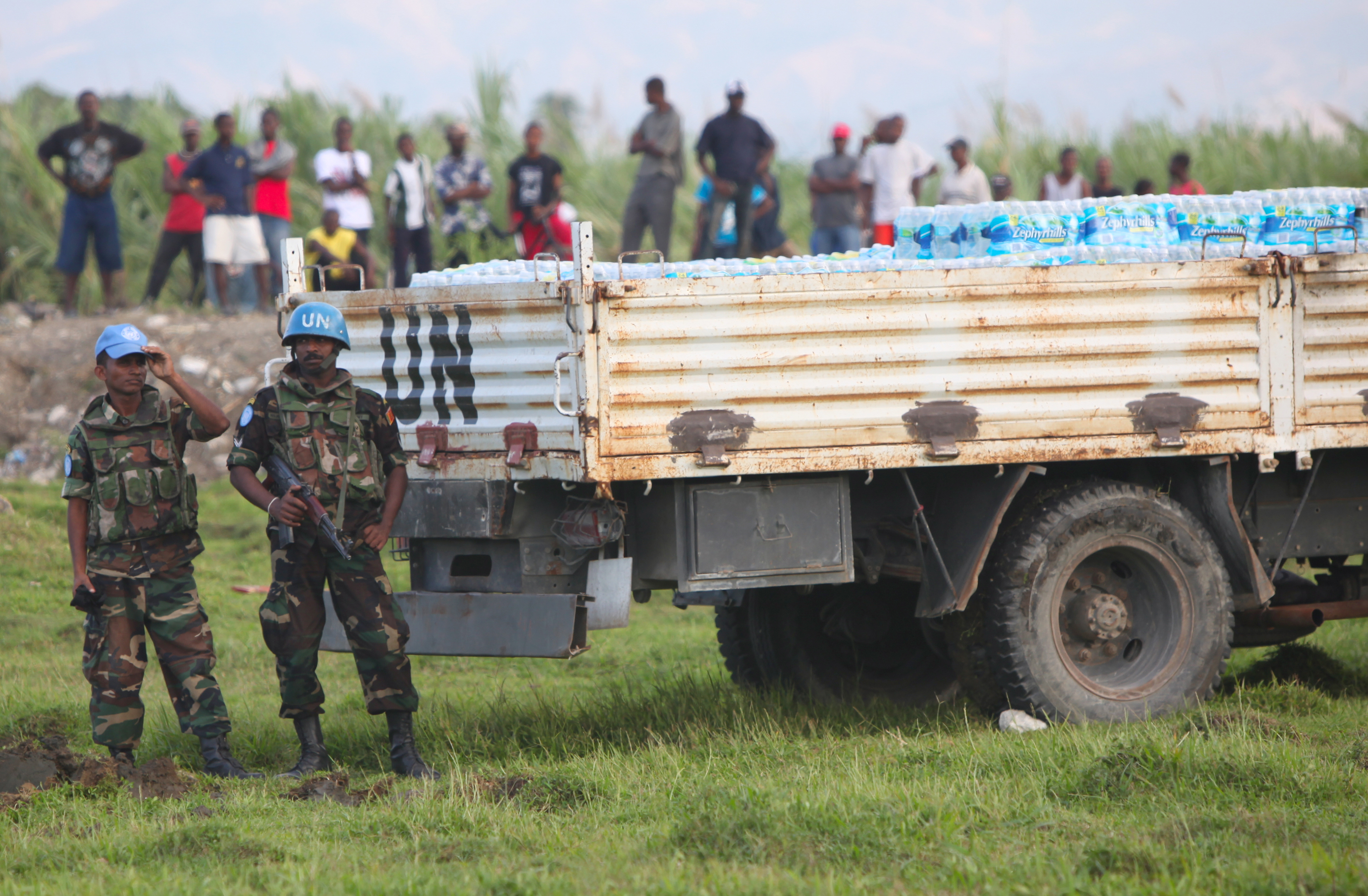
United Nation aid workers prepare to distribute water in support of the humanitarian assistance and disaster relief efforts in Leogane, Haiti, January 20, 2010. The 22nd Marine Expeditionary Unit is a multi-mission capable force comprising Aviation Combat Element, Marine Heavy Helicopter Squadron 461(Reinforced) Logistics Combat Element, Combat Logistics Battalion 22; Ground Combat Element, Battalion Landing Team, 3rd Battalion, 2nd Marine Regiment; and its command element.

== UN aid to Haiti ==
The UN is the largest foreign source of relief aid to Haiti from the 2010 Haiti earthquake, although in December 2011, the Haitian President Michel Martelly said that "The cooperation with Venezuela is the most important in Haiti right now in terms of impact, direct impact." USA, through USAID is giving more than $712 million in aid. However, this amount also comprises donations of many non-governmental organizations such as World Vision and the Red Cross accumulated from different parts of the globe through various campaigns in support of Haiti. In comparison, the EU and the 27 member-states alone are providing over 400 million euro, which is about $650 million.

Following the 2010 Haiti earthquake Venezuela made substantial contributions to the humanitarian response to the earthquake, pledging $1.3bn in aid in addition to cancelling $395m in PetroCaribe debt. Projects included the construction of three power plants, which provided a fifth of Haiti's electricity in December 2011.

A country by country Excel report can be seen here, where the EU countries are presented separately, and the US contribution is diminished to about 460 million dollars. (*Represents aid tied to 2010 earthquake relief)

Country/organisation	ISO country code	Funding, committed and uncommitted
Others		639,381,379
Private (individuals & organisations)		593,639,219
United States	US	466,879,506
Canada	CA	130,733,775
World Bank (emergency grant)		82,107,356
Japan	JP	70,744,798
Saudi Arabia	SA	50,000,000
Spain	ES	47,664,745
European Commission		43,290,043
France	FR	33,844,153
United Kingdom	UK	33,070,138
Central Emergency Response Fund (CERF)		27,976,462
Norway	NO	25,298,044
Sweden	SE	25,039,684
Germany	DE	21,645,022
Brazil	BR	16,884,782
Denmark	DK	16,288,032
Australia	AU	13,489,209
China	CN	10,813,535
UN & agencies		^{1}
Italy	IT	9,302,037
Switzerland	CH	8,932,039
Finland	FI	8,005,607
Russian Federation	RU	5,700,000
Netherlands	NL	83,448,252
India	IN	5,000,000
United Arab Emirates	AE	3,209,113
Ghana	GH	3,000,000
Ireland	IE	2,886,002
Donors not specified		2,219,169
Indonesia	ID	1,700,000
Czech Republic	CZ	1,154,401
Belgium	BE	1,151,876
Poland	PL	1,089,466
New Zealand	NZ	1,000,000
Morocco	MA	1,000,000
Guyana	GY	1,000,000
Estonia	EE	1,000,000
Luxembourg	LU	^{2}
Greece	GR	^{3}
Inter-American Development Bank		200,000
South Africa	ZA	^{4}
WORLD TOTAL		2,422,202,996

== Notes ==
1. Amount unknown

The notes below are conflicting numbers from certain countries and as such may not be accurate are not included in the above table.

2.Conflicting information from the source, original data states 722,900 or 486,000
3.290,000 11,161,000
4.134,904 50,110,000

The economic growth in the world allows the support given to Haiti to be immense: much over 2 billion dollars is generously pooled in from different countries in the world

Due to the growing percent of people living in poverty, it would be necessary to create new infrastructures

== Cuban aid to Haiti ==
Cuban medics have been in Haiti dating back to 1998. In addition, about 1000 Haitian doctors were trained for free by Cuba since that year. Besides from the doctors already in Haiti, an additional medical brigade of 1200 sent by Cuba were among the first responder to the 2010 Haiti earthquake. Under the financial aids from Venezuela, 22 care posts were organized and operated by Cuban health workers. The Cuban medical team also works closely with the assistance of 100 specialists from different countries including Venezuela.

2020 marks the 22nd anniversary of Cuban medical aids to Haiti, during this period which Cuban doctors witness and assist the people Haiti through the Hurricane Georges, the 2010 Haiti earthquake, the 2010s Haiti cholera outbreak and now the 2021 Haiti earthquake. A medical team with 253 specialists from Cuba was the first responder for the mission of assisting and cooperate with the Haitian authorities to provide health care services.

== Venezuelan aid to Haiti ==
Haiti has benefited from a solid economic partnership with Venezuela. This recently forged friendship between Venezuelan president Hugo Chávez and Haitian president René Préval has resulted in various economic agreements. After a visit by Chavez in March 2007, Venezuela and Cuba announced a $1 Billion fund to develop energy, health, and infrastructure in Haiti. As part of this deal, 4 power plants were constructed in Port-au-Prince, Cap-Haïtien, and Gonaïves, increasing the country's power production by 160 MW in 2007. An oil refinery was constructed in Haiti, with a production capacity of 10,000 barrels (1,600 m^{3}) of oil per day. In the meantime, Venezuela has increased the amount of petroleum it provides Haiti to 14,000 barrels per day (2,200 m^{3}/d), at the same terms afforded to ALBA member countries - these terms are more favorable than the Petrocaribe terms.

Venezuela's assistance to Haiti is founded upon a historic act where the newly independent Haiti welcomed and tended to first Francisco de Miranda, then to Simón Bolívar and provided both with military assistance in the liberation of much of South America.
