= Digicel Haiti Earthquake Relief Fund =

Digicel Haiti Earthquake Relief Fund was established by Digicel (the largest mobile telecommunications operator in the Caribbean) after the January 12 earthquake to raise funds for the recovery/relief efforts in Haiti.

Within 24 hours of the earthquake Digicel launched text and voice donation lines and also set up bank accounts to accept lodgements on behalf of the fund. The Digicel Haiti Relief Fund received and continues to receive overwhelming support as they collected over US$500,000 in donations within the first nine days and attracted over 60,000 fans to its Facebook fanpage within the first 2 weeks. That amount is in addition to the US$5 Million donation made by Digicel on January 13, 2010.

All contributions to the Digicel Haiti Relief Fund are used to send emergency aid such as food, water and medical supplies to NGOs on the ground in Haiti. Digicel has also distributed aid directly to thousands of Haitians in the nation's capital.

Rise Again - Support From The Music Fraternity

International recording artiste 'Shaggy' has written and recorded a song 'Rise Again' to raise money for the Digicel Haiti Relief Fund. Other artistes on the track include Sean Kingston, Sean Paul, Destra Garcia, Alison Hines, Tessane Chin, Etana and Haitian artiste Bello. The song was made available for download on iTunes with the artistes and labels agreeing to donate all proceeds from the song to the Digicel Haiti relief fund.
