= Canada for Haiti =

2010 Canadian television special

Canada for Haiti is a Canadian television special that aired on January 22, 2010. The special was meant as a relief concert to help those affected by the 2010 Haiti earthquake. Canada's major broadcasters CBC, Citytv, CTV and Global, simulcasted the event. Hosted by Cheryl Hickey, Ben Mulroney and George Stroumboulopoulos, the program aired at 7 PM ET and PT, 8 PM AT and MT, 8:30 PM NT and 9 PM CT.

== Donations ==
Donations collected through the special benefitted the Canadian Red Cross Society, CARE Canada, Free the Children, Oxfam, Plan Canada, Save the Children Canada, UNICEF and World Vision Canada. Donations were collected through the website, canadaforhaiti.com, a phone line (1-877-51-HAITI), and through text messages until February 12, 2010.

The event raised $13.5 million. Francophone radio and television stations presented a similar, French-language special, Ensemble pour Haïti, the same night at 8PM ET. which raised an additional $6.65 million. The $16 million total will be matched by the Canadian federal government to bring the total raised funds to $40 million.

On January 23, the day after the telethon, Prime Minister Stephen Harper decided to remove the $50 million donation cap, because of Canadians, "overwhelming generosity".

== Guests and performers ==
Many guests appeared, including; James Cameron, Celine Dion, Deryck Whibley, Jason Reitman, Ryan Reynolds, William Shatner, Rachelle Lefevre, Joshua Jackson, Pamela Anderson, Eugene Levy, Norman Jewison, Tom Jackson, Will Arnett, Sandra Oh, Brent Butt, Hugh Dillon, Mike Holmes, Rick Mercer, Alex Trebek, Justin Bieber, Sarah McLachlan, Barenaked Ladies, Simple Plan, David Foster, Chantal Kreviazuk, Raine Maida, Measha Brueggergosman, Craig Kielburger, Wayne Gretzky and Steve Nash, Michael J. Fox, Geddy Lee and Rachel McAdams. Also, Governor General Michaëlle Jean and the then Prime Minister, Stephen Harper, made televised speeches. Nelly Furtado, K'Naan, Metric, and The Tragically Hip gave musical performances during the benefit.

== See also ==
- 2010 Haiti earthquake
- Canada–Haiti relations
- Canadian response to the earthquake aftermath
