= Italian aircraft carrier Cavour =

Italian aircraft carrier

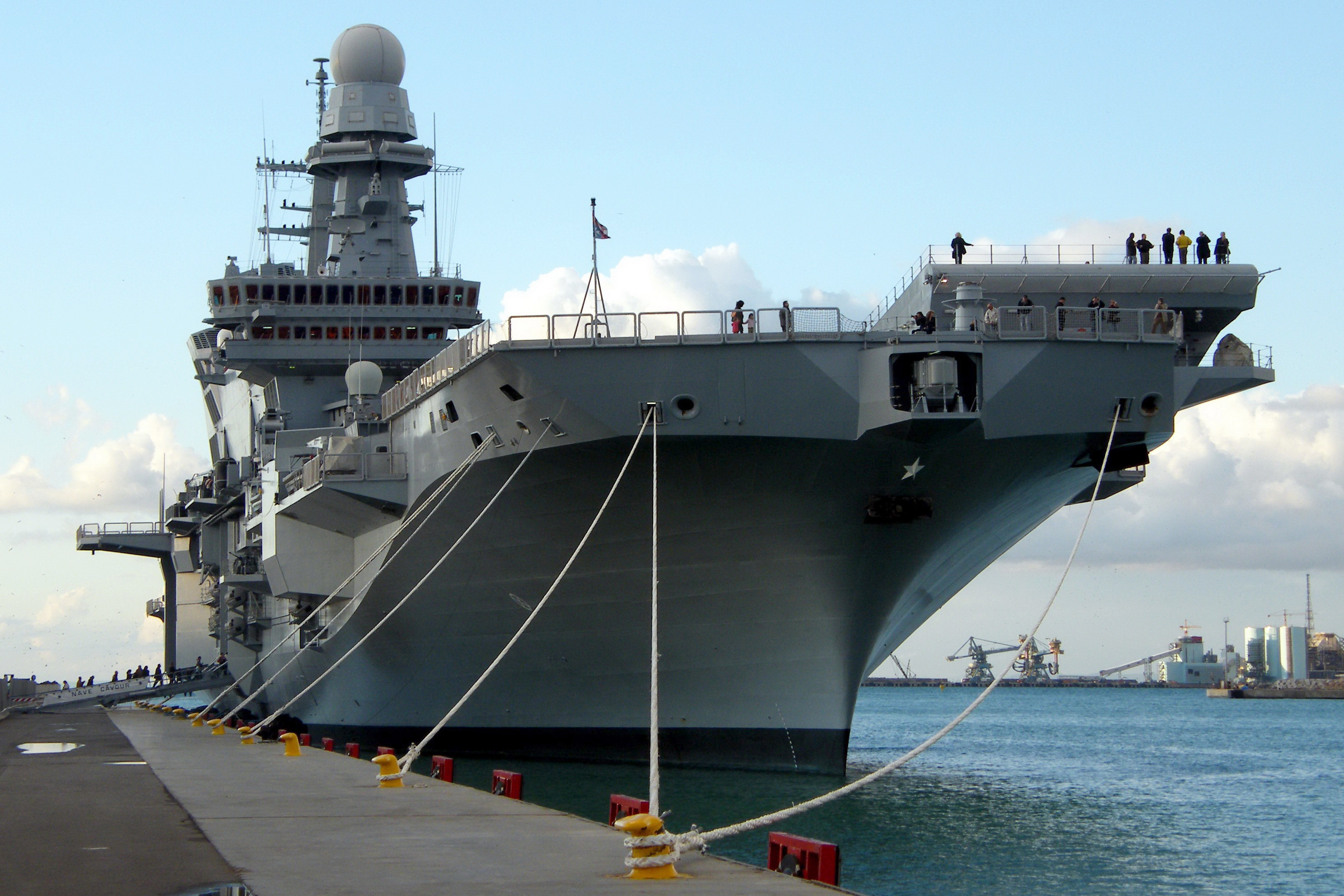

History

Italy
- Name: Cavour
- Namesake: Camillo Benso, conte di Cavour
- Ordered: 22 November 2000
- Builder: Fincantieri
- Cost: €1.39 billion (2010)
- Laid down: 17 July 2001
- Launched: 20 July 2004
- Commissioned: 27 March 2008
- In service: 10 June 2009
- Home port: Taranto
- Identification: Pennant number: 550
- Motto: In arduis servare mentem Remain calm even in dire straits
- Status: Active

General characteristics
- Type: Aircraft carrier
- Displacement: 27,100 metric tons (26,700 long tons) (30,000 MT full load)
- Length: 244 m (800 ft 6 in) LOA
- Beam: 29.1 m (95 ft 6 in); 39 m (127 ft 11 in) moulded breadth
- Draught: 8.7 m (28 ft 7 in)
- Propulsion: COGAG scheme; 2 × shafts; 4 × General Electric/Avio LM2500+ gas turbines providing 88,000 kW (118,000 bhp); 6 × diesel generators Wärtsila CW 12V200 13,200 kW (17,700 bhp)
- Speed: 29 knots (54 km/h; 33 mph) (Max sustained speed, 85% MCR)
- Range: 7,000 nmi (13,000 km; 8,100 mi) at 16 knots (30 km/h; 18 mph)
- Complement: 1,202 (90 more on option) of which: 5 Flag Officers and VIPs; 486 crew; 211 embarked air wing; 140 C^{4} staff; 360 troops (90 more on option)
- Sensors & processing systems: – Selex RAN-40L 3D L-band long-range radar; Selex ES EMPAR (SPY-790) multifunction radar; Selex ES RAN-30X/I RASS (SPS-791) surface radar; 2 × SELEX ES RTN-25X Orion, fire direction radars; PAR (Precision Approach Radar) Selex ES MM/SPN-720; PALS (Precision Approach and Landing System) Telephonics AN/SPN-41A; 2 × GEM Elettronica MM/SPN-753(v)10 navigation radars; Selex ES SIR-R/S IFF system; TACAN SRN-15 A; WASS SNA-2000 Mine Avoidance Sonar (Leonardo Thesan); 2 × Selex ES IRST SASS (Silent Acquisition and Surveillance System); GEM Elettronica IRST EOSS-100; underwater telephone
- Electronic warfare & decoys: Elettronica Spa NETTUNO-4100 ECM System; – EW System (RESM/CESM, RECM)
- Armament: 4 × 8-cell A-43 Sylver launchers carrying the MBDA Aster 15 surface-to-air missile; 2 × OTO Melara 76/62 mm Strales guns; 3 × OTO Melara 25/80 gun with Oerlikon KBA 25mm; 2 × ODLS-H/ODLS OTO Melara decoy launching systems
- Aircraft carried: flight deck: 232.60 m (763 ft 1 in) × 34.5 m (113 ft 2 in); 20–30; hangar capacity: 134.2 m (440 ft 3 in) × 21.0 m (68 ft 11 in); 10 × F-35B Lightning II; 12 × AgustaWestland AW101; LBA Systems Bayraktar TB3 (future)
- Notes: 4 LCVP

Cavour (Italian: Portaerei Cavour) is an Italian aircraft carrier launched in 2004. It is the flagship of the Italian Navy.

== Design ==
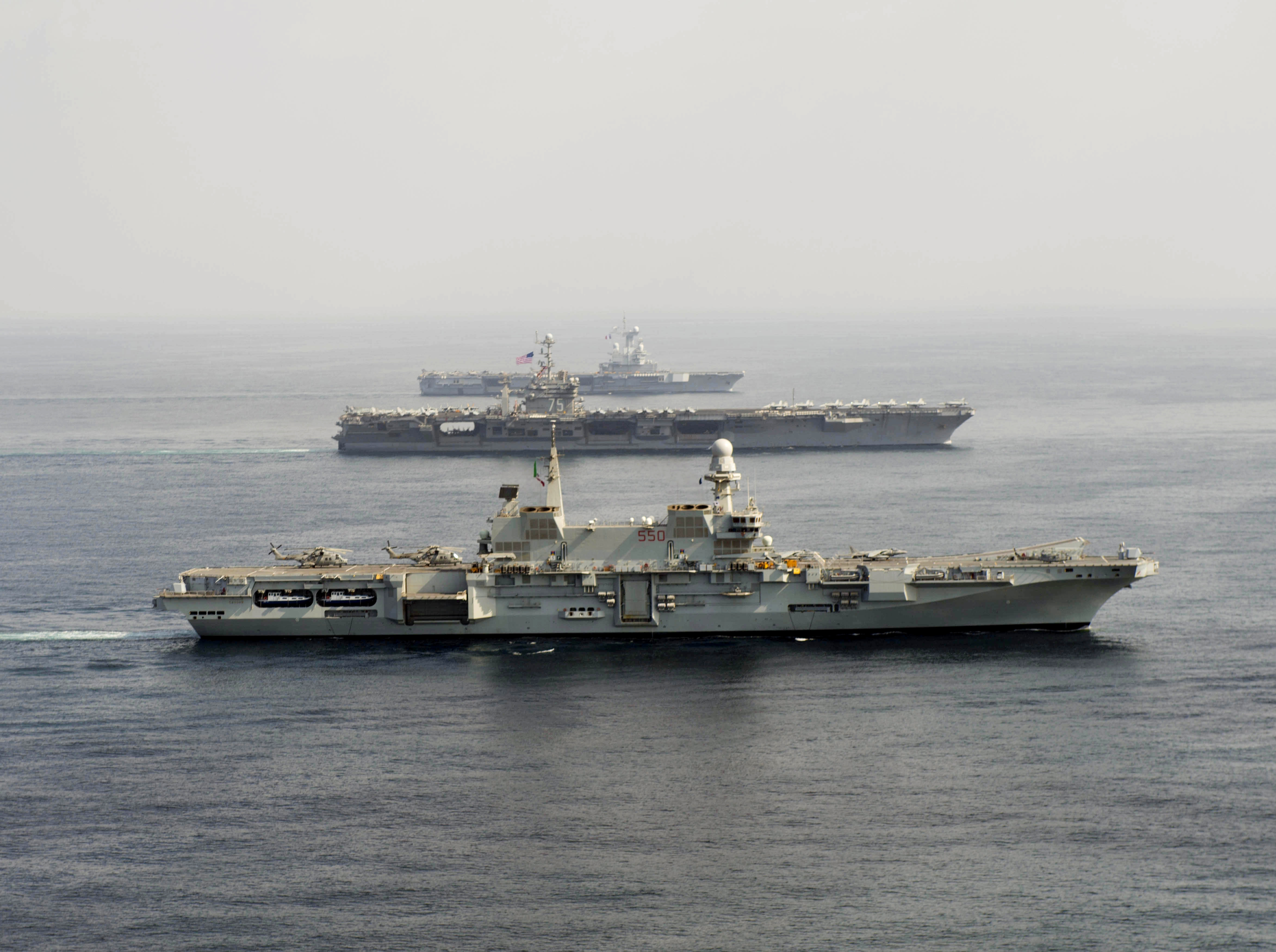
Cavour (foreground) operating with Harry S. Truman (middle) and Charles de Gaulle (background) in the Gulf of Oman, 2014

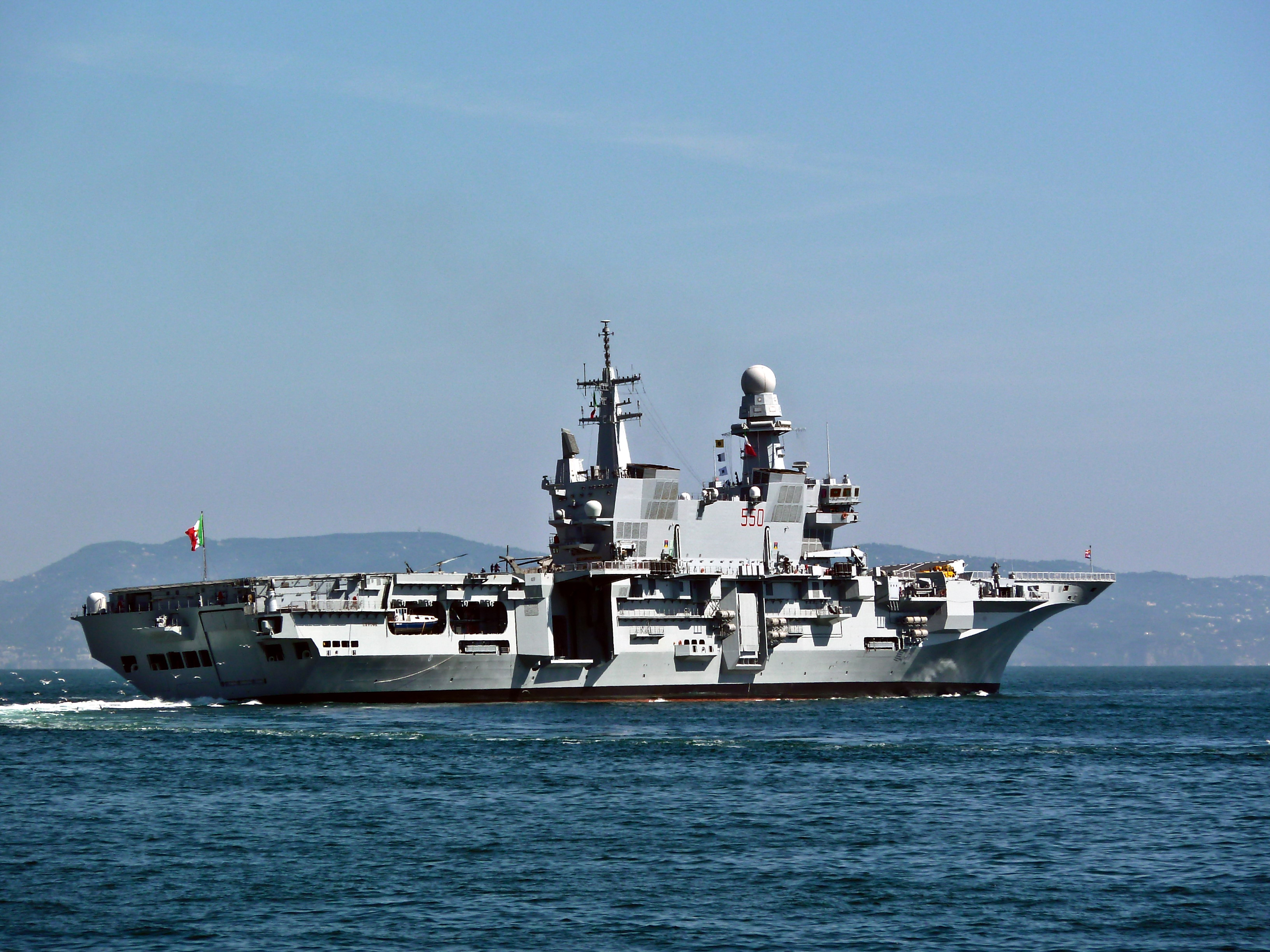
Cavour maneuvering in the Gulf of Naples

The ship is designed to combine fixed-wing V/STOL and helicopter air operations, command and control operations, and the transport of military or civil personnel and heavy vehicles. The 134 m (440 ft), 2,800 m^{2} (30,000 sq ft) hangar space can double as a vehicle hold capable of holding up to 24 main battle tanks (typically Ariete) or many more lighter vehicles (50 Dardo IFV, 100+ Iveco LMV), and is fitted aft with access ramps rated to 70 tons, as well as two elevators rated up to 30 tons for aircraft. Cavour can also operate as landing platform helicopter, accommodating heavy transport helicopters (AgustaWestland UH-101A ASH) and 325 marines (91 more, on option). The Cavour has a displacement of 27,900 tons but can reach more than 30,000 tons at full military capacity.

It complemented the Italian Navy's other aircraft carrier, the Giuseppe Garibaldi, before the older ship was decommissioned in 2024.

The Italian Navy planned to replace its 16 Harriers with 15 (originally 22) Lockheed Martin F-35B Lightning IIs. Cavour was to have room for ten F-35Bs in the hangar, and six more parked on deck. By May 2020, the modernization to allow Cavour to support the F-35B was completed, and the carrier was ready for subsequent integration trials.

In March 2026, the Italian Navy announced plans to acquire the Turkish-developed Bayraktar TB3 unmanned combat aerial vehicle (UCAV) to operate from Cavour. The acquisition is being facilitated through a strategic partnership between Baykar and Leonardo (via the LBA Systems Joint Venture). The TB3, which features folding wings and short-take-off capability, will provide the carrier with organic fixed-wing intelligence, surveillance, reconnaissance (ISR), and strike capabilities, functioning as a cost-effective complement to the F-35B fleet.

== Name ==
The ship was named in honor of Camillo Benso, Count of Cavour (after proposals such as Luigi Einaudi and Andrea Doria were discarded) and became the NUM (New Major Unit) of the Italian Navy, joining the aircraft carrier Giuseppe Garibaldi. Its name holds historical significance for the Italian Navy, as a tribute to the strong impetus that Count of Cavour gave to the expansion and development of the Italian Navy, born from the fusion of the pre-unification navies, in the aftermath of Italy's unification.

== Construction ==
Cavour was laid down by Fincantieri in June 2001, and was launched from the Riva Trigoso shipyard at Sestri Levante, on 20 July 2004. Sea trials began in December 2006, and she was officially commissioned on 27 March 2008. Full operational capability (FOC) was reached on 10 June 2009.

== Service history ==
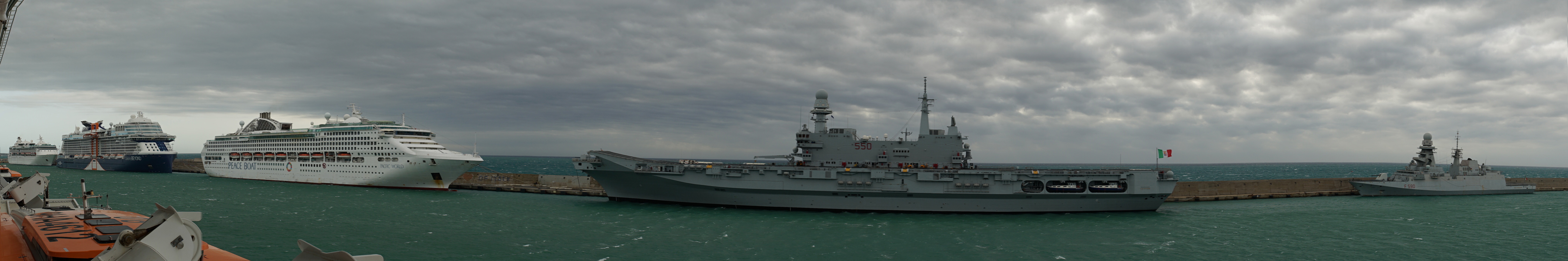
Cavour docked at Civitavecchia (near Rome) with frigate Carlo Bergamini and a full cast of cruise ships on 30 October 2023

On 19 January 2010, Cavour was dispatched to Haiti as part of Operation White Crane, Italy's operation for 2010 Haiti earthquake relief. This was the first mission of the aircraft carrier, where it supplemented international efforts to provide relief for the victims of the 2010 Haiti earthquake.

In 2013 Cavour, an active warship, was used for a Pirelli press presentation for the new Angel GT motorcycle tires. At that commercial event the guests stayed overnight on the ship and rode motorcycles on the flight deck.

It was reported that modernization works on Cavour has been completed. In May 2020, it was announced the Italian aircraft carrier would undertake a preparatory training before sailing to the U.S. where the ship would conduct trials with the F-35B STOVL. In February 2021, Cavour deployed to the United States for its initial period of flying trials with the F-35B. This saw the ship engage in four weeks of verification to determine the performance envelope of the aircraft when operating from the flight deck, using a pair of aircraft from VX-23, the US Navy's Test and Evaluation Squadron. Once these trials were completed, and the ship was passed for operation of the F-35B, it would move to the next phase of fixed-wing flying trials, which would see Italy's own aircraft begin operating from the carrier. On 9 March 2021, USNS John Lenthall replenished her in the western Atlantic Ocean. Then on 20 March, she operated alongside USS Gerald R. Ford in the Atlantic Ocean. On 26 March, she was in Norfolk, Virginia when the F-35B trial was completed. She left Norfolk on 16 April and returned to homeport Taranto on 30 April. Initial operating capability for the F-35s is expected for 2024.

In February 2022, she was part of interoperability training operations with the American carrier Harry S. Truman and the French carrier Charles de Gaulle in the lead up to the Russo-Ukrainian War.

In June 2024, the Cavour Strike Group began a five-month deployment to the Indo-Pacific. On 5 and 6 October, carrier strike groups of the Indian Navy and the Italian Navy led by INS Vikramaditya and Cavour and accompanied by INS Visakhapatnam and Alpino participated in a bilateral maritime exercise in the Arabian Sea. The exercise included aircraft like MiG-29K, F-35B and AV-8B Harrier II and integral helicopters. Operations in the sea phase included intense flight operations with fighter jets and helicopters for combined large force engagements, air combat missions, helicopter operations and search and rescue missions as well as co-ordinated weapon firings and joint manoeuvres to enhance joint operations, command and control capabilities and interoperability. The exercise also saw the participation of the Indian Air Force. During the harbour phase from 1 to 4 October, the exercise saw subject matter expert exchanges and other key interactions as well as a pre-sail planning conference.

== See also ==
- List of naval ship classes in service
- Italian landing helicopter dock Trieste
- Italian Naval Aviation
- Italian battleship Conte di Cavour

== Sources ==
- Cosentino, Michael (2014). "Cavour: A Multi-Role Aircraft Carrier for the Italian Navy". In Jordan, John (ed.). Warship 2014. London: Conway. pp. 93–111. ISBN 978-1-84486-236-8.
