= Operazione White Crane =

Operazione White Crane (Operation White Crane) was Italy's military relief operation for Haiti, following the 12 January 2010 earthquake.

== Force composition ==
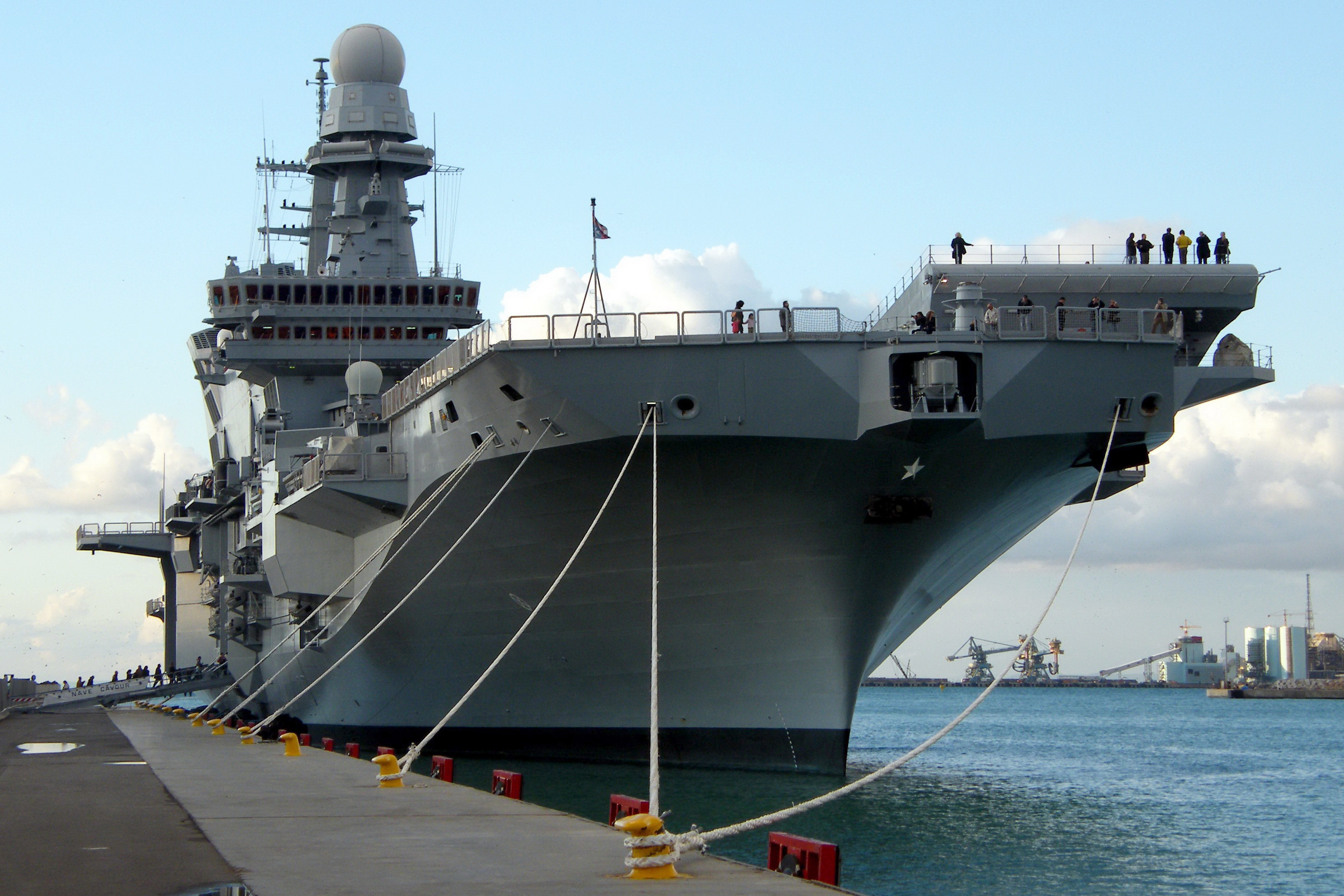
Aircraft carrier Cavour

Italy is sending:

- aircraft carrier Cavour
  - Cavour's complement:
    - 6 Navy helicopters
      - 4 SH-3D helicopters
      - 2 EH-101 helicopters
    - two operating theatres
    - 550 ship's crew, medical complement, force protection sailors
  - Shipped on Cavour: (Task Force Genio)
    - 15 Army tracked vehicles
    - 20 Army wheeled vehicles
    - 5 mobile medical vehicles
    - Army personnel
      - 200 alpine troops of the 2° reggimento Genio di Trento (Note: 2nd engineering regiment of Trento)
    - Air Force personnel
    - Carabinieri military police 13° RGT. "F.G.V."
    - Carabinieri medical unit
    - mobile hospital
    - 200 tonnes of food
- Field hospital
- C-130

== Mission timeline ==
On 14 January 2010, Italy dispatched a C-130 loaded with 20 surgeons, some soldiers, some civil protection officers, and a field hospital. It decided to send a warship.

On 19 January 2010, Cavour set sail for Haiti, leaving La Spezia.

As of 29 January 2010, Cavour had picked up a Brazilian relief force at Fortaleza. The Brazilians added two helicopters, a UH-14 Super Puma and a UH-12 Squirrel (AS350), 11 civilians (6 doctors, 5 nurses), 63 military (25 health professionals).

On 1 February 2010, Cavour arrived at the Dominican Republic port of Puerto Caucedo, near the capital of Santo Domingo. The land element, Task Force Genio, disembarked, and would trek overland to Haiti, due to the damaged docks at Port-au-Prince. Cavour has RO-RO capability. (Note: RO-RO = roll-on, roll-off – similar to a ferry, where you can drive on and drive off again) It would depart for Haiti later.

On 3 February 2010, Cavour had disgorged all the land-mobile land-element. The overland trip to Port-au-Prince from Puerto Caucedo took 36 hours.

On 6 February 2010, Cavour arrived at Port-au-Prince.

As of 7 February 2010, over 25 aid flights using the Italian and Brazilian helicopters over the two days that Cavour had been at Port-au-Prince, had been completed.

Cavour had remain docked at Port-au-Prince through mid-April.

== Reactions ==
Several Italians have criticized the use of Cavour since it costs over 200,000 Euros a day to operate, and shipping by air would have been far faster. Others have said, that it is a drop in the bucket compared to the efforts by the US. Some have pointed out, it is one of the largest efforts out of Europe.
