= Guy Laroche (general) =

J.R.M.G. (Guy) Laroche is a retired major-general of the Canadian Forces.

Laroche joined the Canadian Forces in 1979. By 1980, he had completed his training as an infantry officer and was posted to the Royal 22^{e} Régiment at CFB Valcartier, near Quebec City. Laroche is a graduate of Canadian Land Force Command and Staff College, Kingston, Ontario; the Canadian Forces Staff College in Toronto, Ontario; and the Industrial College of the Armed Forces, Washington, D.C. Laroche also holds a BA in business administration from the Université du Québec and a M.Sc. from the National Defense University, Washington, D.C.

Throughout his career, Laroche served with three battalions of the Royal 22^{e} Régiment in a variety of positions and commanded the 1st Battalion. Laroche also served as a squad commander while attending the Royal Military College, in Ottawa as a staff officer for the Directorate of Land Information Resources (DLIR) in NDHQ, in Kingston, Ontario, where he took a position with the directing staff at the Canadian Land Forces Command and Staff College, and in Valcartier as Base Personnel Services Officer and G3 of 5 Canadian Mechanized Brigade Group.

Laroche served on two occasions under the auspices of the United Nations in Cyprus (1981 and 1992). He also served in Bosnia-Herzegovina twice (1997 and 1999) as battle group commander and as chief of staff of the 5th Canadian Multinational Brigade. Finally, he served as a commander during the 1990 Native American crisis in Kahnawake, Canada.

Laroche was promoted to the rank of colonel in July 2004, when he assumed the duties of J3 International at NDHQ. Following the changes in the Army transformation, Laroche was appointed J3 of Canadian Expeditionary Force Command. In July 2006, he was chosen to be the commander of the 5th Canadian Mechanized Brigade Group. As soon as he was promoted to the rank of brigadier-general in 2007, he was given the job of commander of Joint Task Force Afghanistan rotation four.

In the aftermath of the 2010 Haiti earthquake, Laroche was appointed the commander of a 2,000-strong Canadian military assistance force. For his outstanding performance, he was awarded a second Meritorious Service Cross in October 2010. He retired in 2010.
