= Lodgement (finance) =

Regional finance term

In Ireland a lodgement is an amount lodged to a bank account or paid into a bank account via a "lodgement slip" or "paying in" slip.

In India a lodgement is commonly used for proofs of tax deduction. A "lodgement vendor" is one who will verify proofs (rental receipts, medical receipts) to ensure that they are eligible for deduction as per the rules of Income Tax in India.

In Australia the electronic placing of personal tax returns with the authorities is described as the electronic lodgment (note: alternative spelling) of tax returns.
